= 2022 deaths in the United States (July–December) =

- Decades: 2000s; 2010s; 2020s; 2030s
- See also: History of the United States (2016–present); Timeline of United States history (2010–present); List of years in the United States

The following notable deaths in the United States occurred in 2022 within the period July–December. Names are reported under the date of death, in alphabetical order as set out in WP:NAMESORT. A typical entry reports information in the following sequence: Name, age, country of citizenship at birth and subsequent nationality (if applicable), what subject was noted for, year of birth (if known), and reference.

== July ==
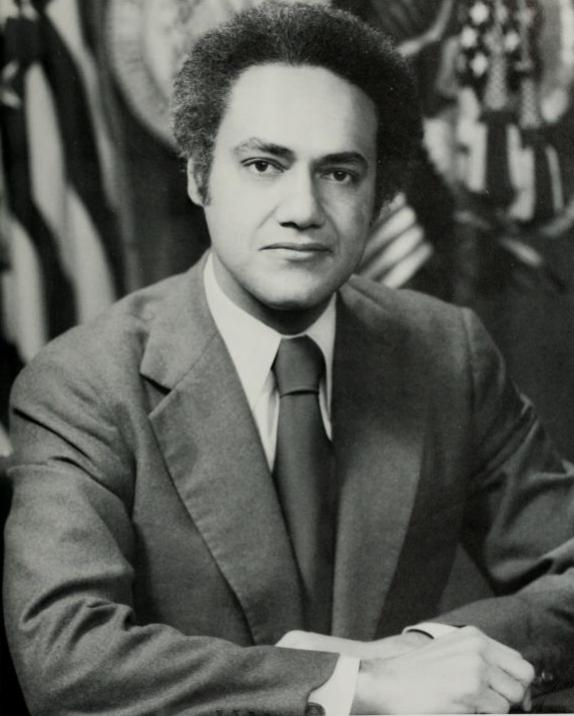
Clifford Alexander Jr.

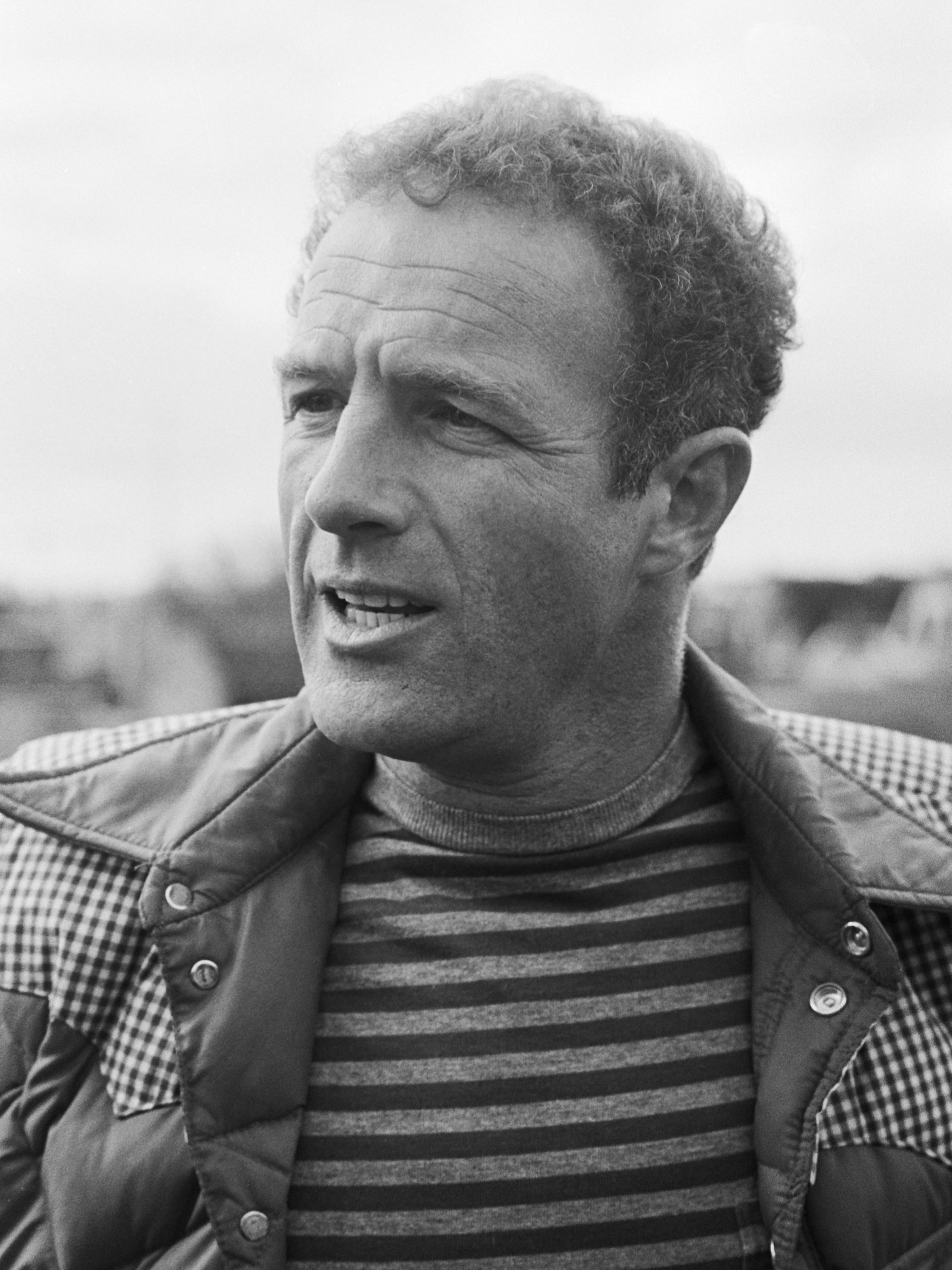
James Caan

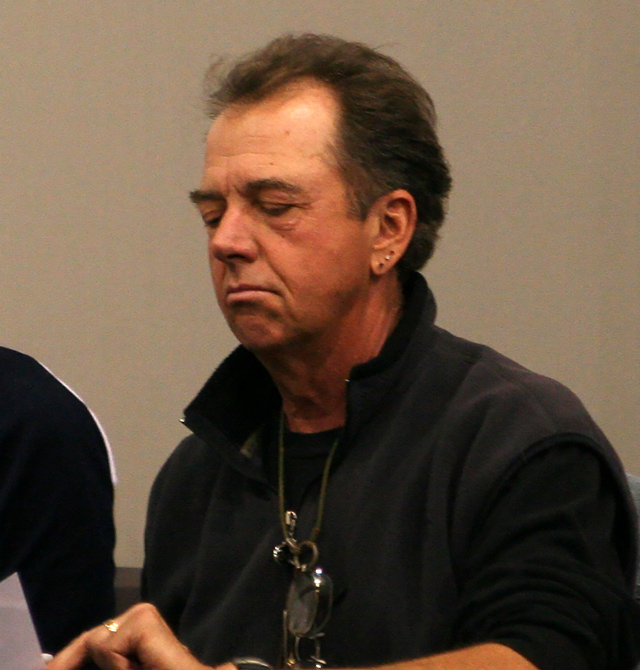
Gregory Itzin

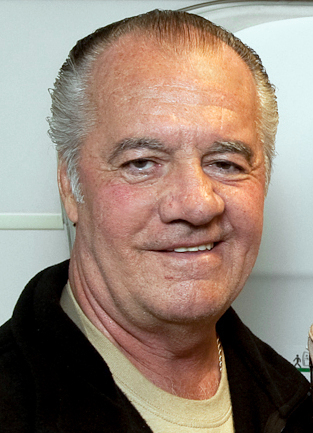
Tony Sirico

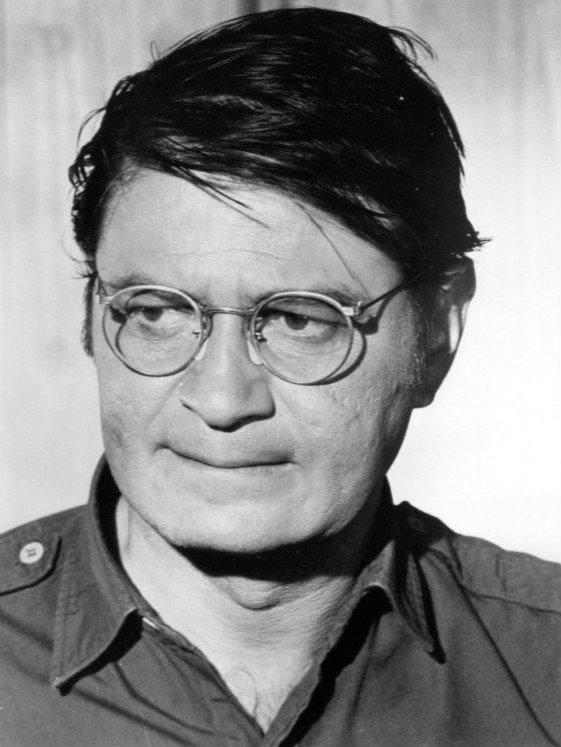
Larry Storch

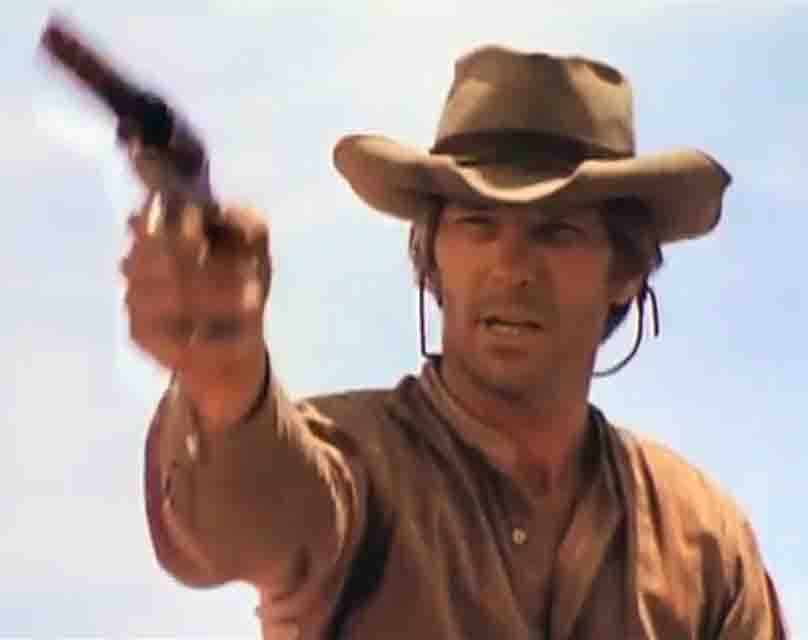
L. Q. Jones

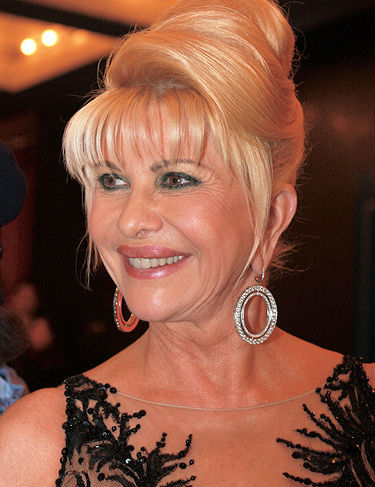
Ivana Trump

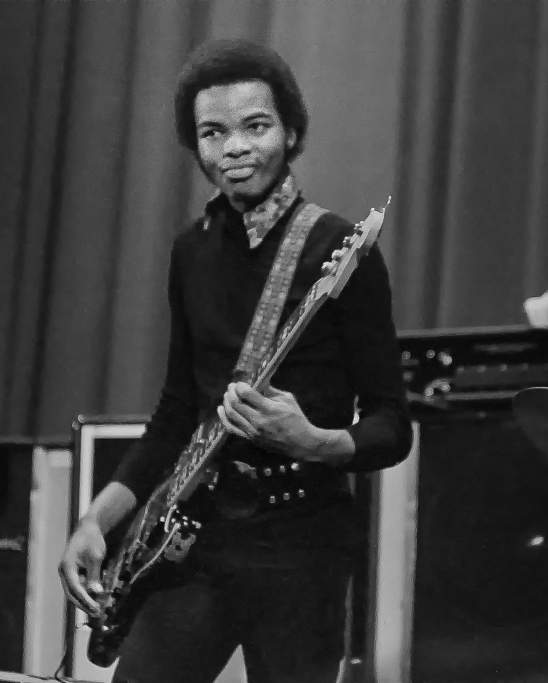
Michael Henderson

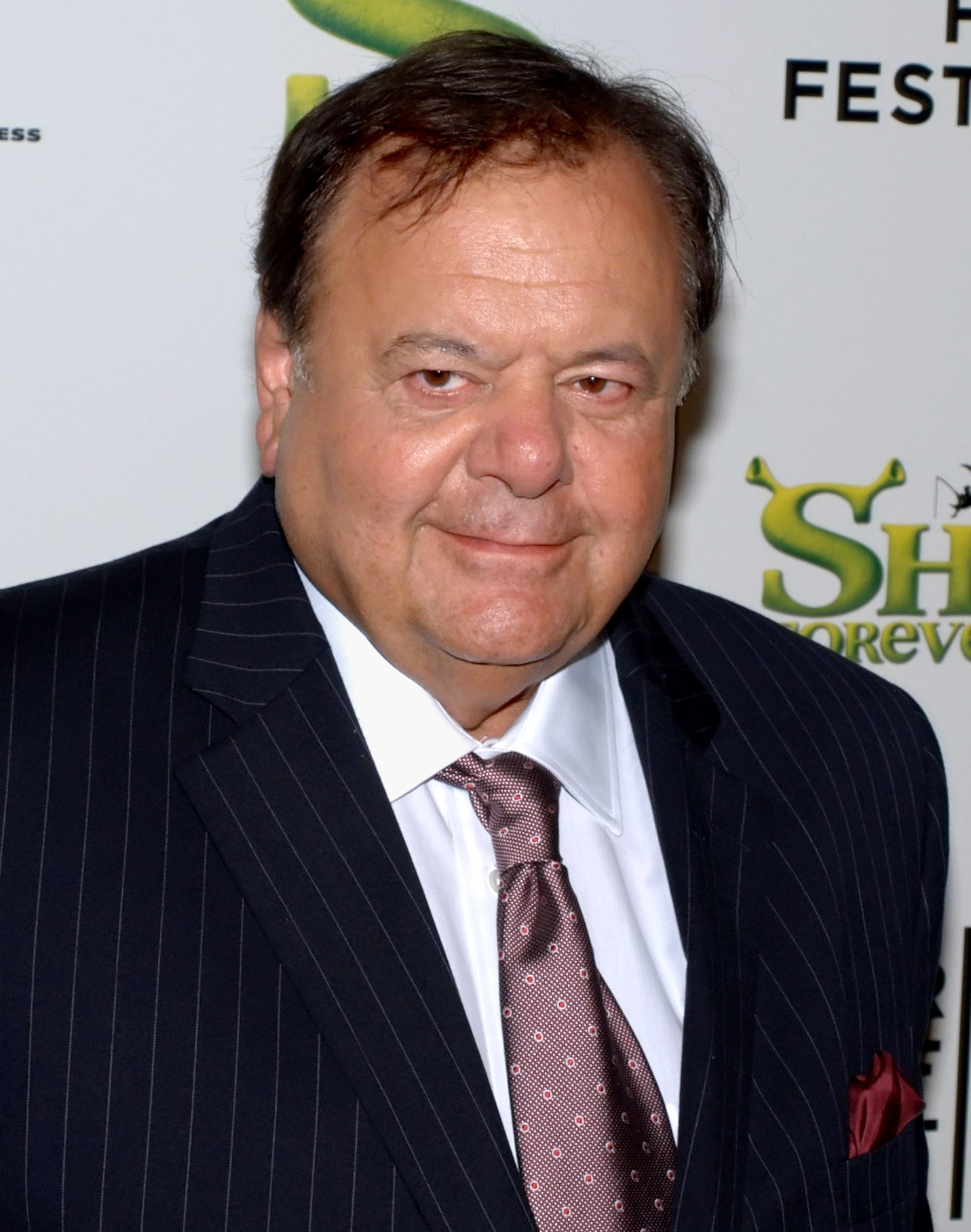
Paul Sorvino

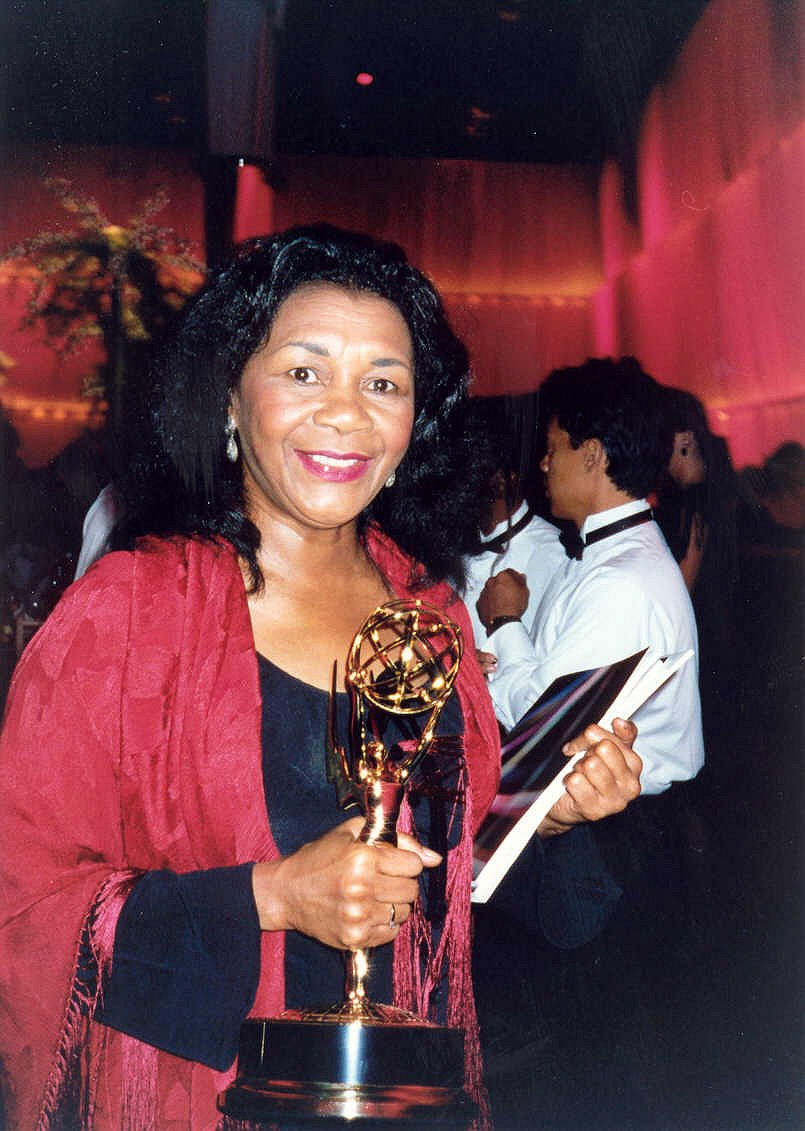
Mary Alice

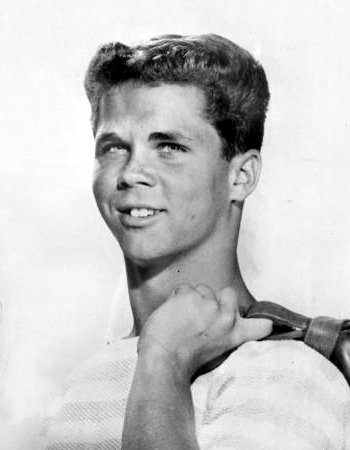
Tony Dow

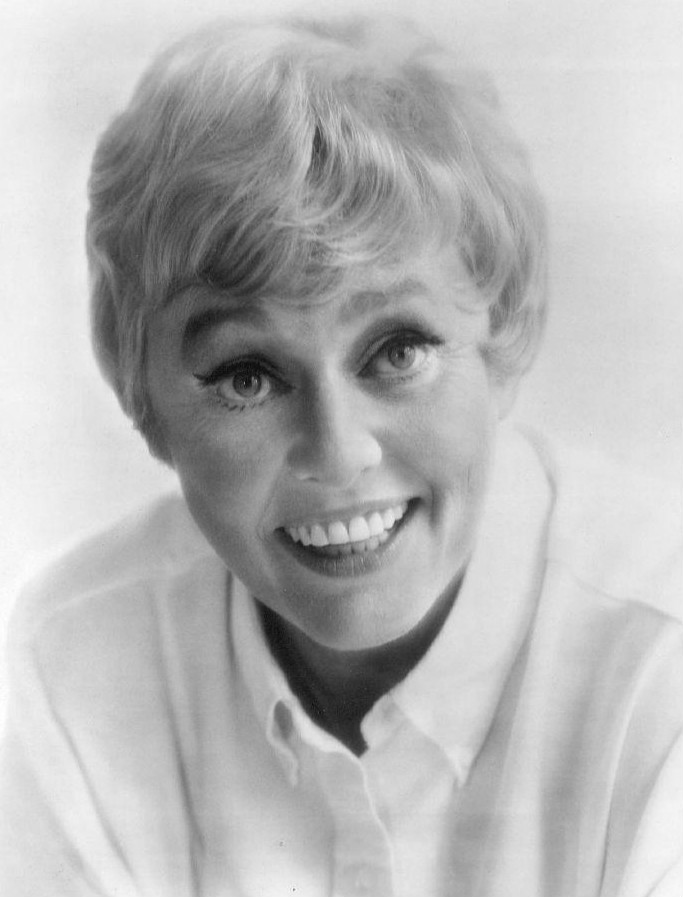
Pat Carroll

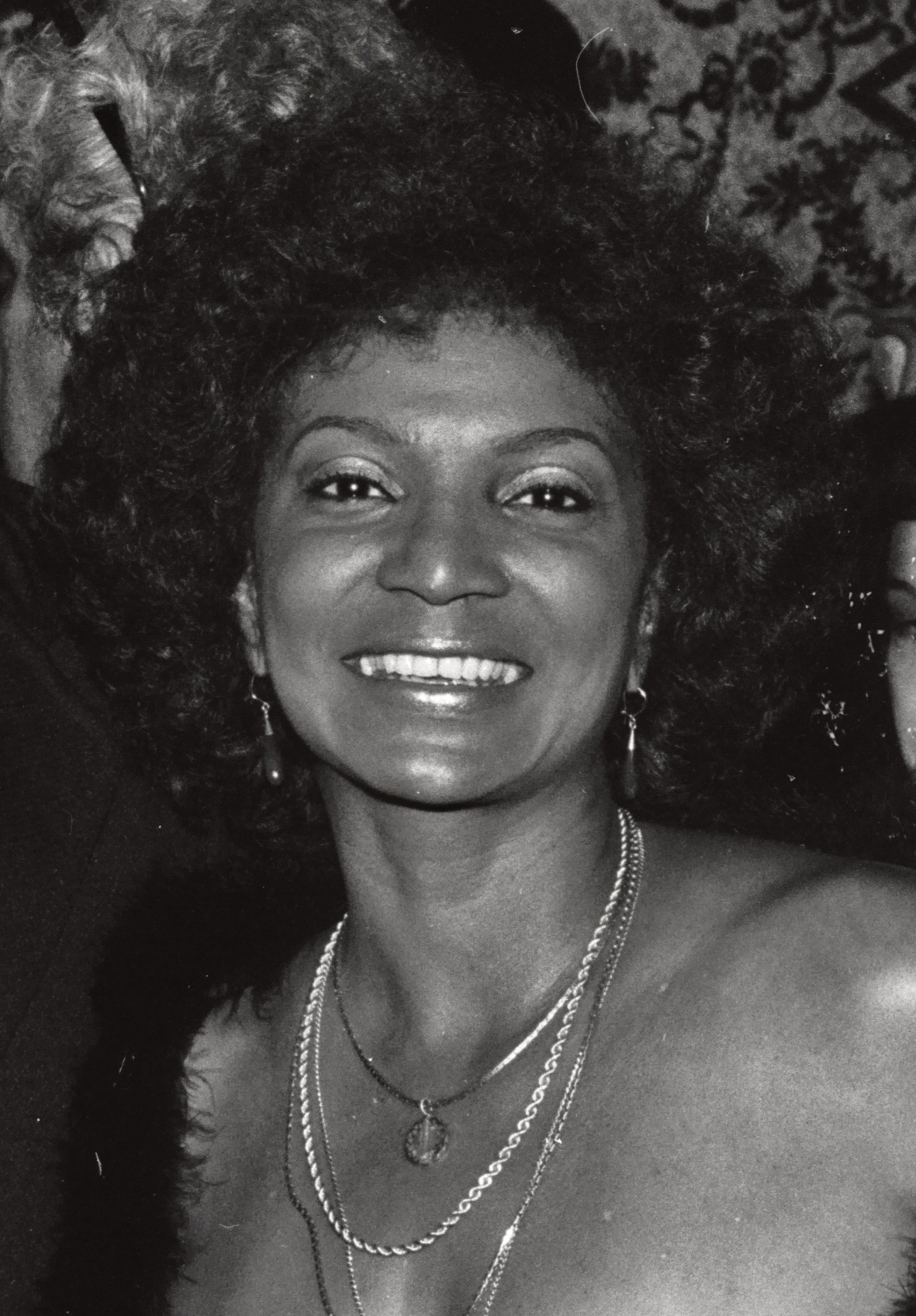
Nichelle Nichols

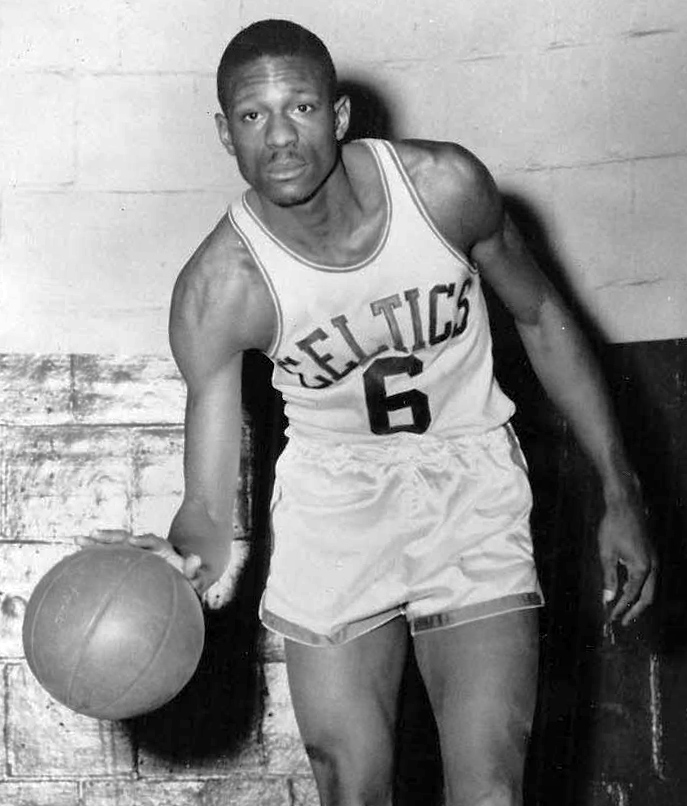
Bill Russell

- July 1
  - Richard Taruskin, 77, musicologist (Oxford History of Western Music) (b. 1945)
- July 2
  - Ed Hindson, 77, televangelist and academic (Liberty University) (b. 1944)
  - Ryan Leone, 36, novelist and prison reform activist (b. 1985)
  - Jim Van Pelt, 86, football player (Michigan Wolverines, Winnipeg Blue Bombers) (b. 1935)
  - Jeffrey Plale, 54, politician, Wisconsin Railroad Commissioner (2011–2016), member of the Wisconsin State Assembly (1996–2003) and Senate (2003–2011) (b. 1968)
  - Spider Webb, 78, tattoo artist (b. 1944)
  - John Watson, 73, football player (San Francisco 49ers, New Orleans Saints) (b. 1949)
- July 3
  - Clifford Alexander Jr., 88, lawyer, Secretary of the Army (1977–1981) (b. 1933)
  - Joseph Banowetz, 87, classical pianist and pedagogue (b. 1934)
  - Robert Curl, 88, chemist, Nobel Prize laureate (1996) (b. 1933)
  - Bradford C. Freeman, 97, World War II veteran, last surviving member of Easy Company (b. 1924)
  - Robb Hanrahan, 60, journalist (WHP-TV) (b. 1962)
  - Charles Wesley Turnbull, 87, politician, governor of the United States Virgin Islands (1999–2007) (b. 1935)
- July 4
  - Richard J. Bernstein, 90, philosopher (b. 1932)
  - Bailey Doogan, 80, painter (b. 1941)
  - Hank Goldberg, 82, sports journalist (WQAM, ESPN) (b. 1940)
  - Mac McLendon, 76, golfer (PGA Tour) (b. 1945)
  - Ronald Moon, 81, judge, associate Justice (1990–1993) and Chief Justice (1993–2010) of the Supreme Court of Hawaii (b. 1940)
- July 5
  - Lenny Von Dohlen, 63, actor (Twin Peaks, Electric Dreams, Home Alone 3) (b. 1958)
- July 6
  - James Caan, 82, actor (The Godfather, Misery, Elf) (b. 1940)
  - Lynn Dean, 98, politician, member of the Louisiana State Senate (1996–2004) (b. 1923)
  - Dale Douglass, 86, golfer (PGA Tour) (b. 1936)
  - Lonnie Hunt, 85, entrepreneur (Hunt Brothers Pizza) (b. 1936)
  - Royce W. Murray, 85, chemist (b. 1937)
  - Ira Valentine, 59, football player (Houston Oilers) (b. 1963)
- July 7
  - Mike Brito, 87, Cuban-born baseball scout (Los Angeles Dodgers) (b. 1934)
  - George Elder, 101, baseball player (St. Louis Browns) (b. 1921)
  - Don Graham, 87, music promoter (b. 1934)
  - Robert Halbritter, 92, judge and politician, member of the West Virginia House of Delegates (1966–1971) (b. 1930)
  - R. C. Harvey, 85, cartoonist and comics historian (b. 1937)
  - Adam Wade, 87, singer ("The Writing on the Wall") and television host (Musical Chairs) (b. 1935)
  - Jimmy Williams, 43, football player (San Francisco 49ers, Seattle Seahawks) (b. 1979)
- July 8
  - Hugh Evans, 81, Hall of Fame basketball referee (NBA) (b. 1941)
  - Gregory Itzin, 74, actor (24, Star Trek) (b. 1948)
  - Bob Parsons, 72, football player (Chicago Bears) (b. 1950)
  - Tony Sirico, 79, actor (The Sopranos) (b. 1942)
  - Larry Storch, 99, actor (F Troop) and comedian (b. 1923)
- July 9
  - Tommy Jacobs, 87, golfer (b. 1935)
  - L. Q. Jones, 94, actor (The Wild Bunch, Hang 'Em High) and film director (A Boy and His Dog) (b. 1927)
  - Matt King, 37, visual artist, co-founder of Meow Wolf (b. 1984)
  - Ann Shulgin, 91, New Zealand-born writer (PiHKAL, TiHKAL) (b. 1931)
- July 10
  - Gil Burford, 98, ice hockey player (Michigan Wolverines) (b. 1924)
  - Warren Kitzmiller, 79, politician, member of the Vermont House of Representatives (2001–2014) (b. 1943) (death announced on this date)
  - Gerald McEntee, 87, trade unionist, president of AFSCME (1981–2012) (b. 1935)
  - Nelson Pinder, 89, civil rights activist (b. 1932)
- July 11
  - David Dalton, 80, British-born author and editor (Rolling Stone) (b. 1942)
  - Jimmie Lou Fisher, 80, politician, treasurer of Arkansas (1981–2003).
  - Gary Moeller, 81, college football coach (Illinois, Michigan, Detroit Lions) (b. 1941)
  - Ducky Schofield, 87, baseball player (St. Louis Cardinals, Pittsburgh Pirates, San Francisco Giants) (b. 1935)
  - Bernard Toone, 65, basketball player (Philadelphia 76ers, Latte Matese Caserta, Gaiteros del Zulia) (b. 1956)
- July 12
  - Philip Lieberman, 87, cognitive scientist (b. 1934)
- July 13
  - Rashard Anderson, 45, football player (Carolina Panthers) (b. 1977)
  - Kerry J. Donley, 66, politician, mayor of Alexandria, Virginia (1996–2003) (b. 1956)
  - Bobby East, 37, racing driver (NASCAR Craftsman Truck Series) (b.1984)
  - Mark Fleischman, 82, businessman (Studio 54) (b. 1940)
  - John Froines, 83, chemist and civil rights activist (Chicago Seven) (b. 1939)
  - Michael James Jackson, 65, music producer (Kiss, L.A. Guns) (b. 1956)
  - James M. McCoy, 91, United States Air Force Non-commissioned officer, and 6th Chief Master Sergeant of the Air Force (1979–1981) (b. 1930)
  - Spencer Webb, 22, college football player (Oregon Ducks) (b. 2000)
- July 14
  - William "Poogie" Hart, 77, singer (The Delfonics) and songwriter ("La-La (Means I Love You)") (b. 1945)
  - Jak Knight, 28, comedian, television writer and actor (Big Mouth, Bust Down, Black-ish) (b. 1993)
  - Ivana Trump, 73, Czech-born businesswoman, media personality, and model (b. 1949)
  - Albert Vann, 87, politician, member of the New York State Assembly (1975–2001) and New York City Council (2002–2013) (b. 1934)
  - Carleton Varney, 85, interior designer (b. 1937)
- July 15
  - Howard N. Watson, 93, watercolor painter (b. 1929)
- July 16
  - Hobie Billingsley, 94, Hall of Fame diving coach (Indiana Hoosiers) (b. 1937)
  - Patrick Michaels, 72, climatologist (b. 1950)
  - Mark Nye, 76, politician, member of the Idaho House of Representatives (2014–2016) and Senate (since 2016) (b. 1945)
  - Idris Phillips, 64, musician and composer (b. 1958)
  - Mickey Rooney Jr., 77, actor (Hot Rods to Hell, Honeysuckle Rose) (b. 1945)
  - Gerald Shargel, 77, attorney (b. 1944)
- July 17
  - Eric Flint, 75, author (1632) and editor (b. 1947)
- July 18
  - Rebecca Balding, 73, actress (Soap, Charmed, Makin' It) (b. 1948)
  - Vincent DeRosa, 101, musician (hornist) (b. 1920)
  - Claes Oldenburg, 93, Swedish-born sculptor (b. 1929)
- July 19
  - Michael Henderson, 71, bass guitarist (Miles Davis) and vocalist (b. 1950)
  - Charles Johnson, 50, football player (Pittsburgh Steelers, Philadelphia Eagles, New England Patriots) (b. 1972)
- July 20
  - Bill Burbach, 74, baseball player (New York Yankees) (b. 1947)
  - Rex Crawford, 90, American-born Canadian politician, MP (1988–1997) (b. 1932)
  - Stephen G. Olmstead, 92, United States Marine Corps lieutenant general (b. 1929)
- July 21
  - Taurean Blacque, 82, actor (Hill Street Blues, Oliver & Company, Savannah) (b. 1940)
  - Shlomo Carlebach, 96, German-born Haredi rabbi and scholar (b. 1925)
  - Johnny Egan, 83, basketball player and coach (b. 1939)
  - Jim Lynch, 76, Hall of Fame football player (Notre Dame Fighting Irish, Kansas City Chiefs), Super Bowl champion (1970) (b. 1945)
- July 22
  - Emilie Benes Brzezinski, 90, Swiss-born sculptor, widow of Zbigniew Brzezinski (b. 1932)
  - Dwight Smith, 58, baseball player (Chicago Cubs, Atlanta Braves), World Series champion (1995) (b. 1963)
- July 23
  - Ronald S. Dancer, 73, politician, member of the New Jersey General Assembly (since 2002) (b. 1949)
  - Robert Dutton, 71, politician, member of the California State Assembly (2002–2004) and Senate (2004–2012) (b. 1950)
  - Diane Hegarty, 80, satanist, co-founder of the Church of Satan (b. 1942)
  - Aaron Latham, 78, journalist and screenwriter (Urban Cowboy, Perfect, The Program) (b. 1943)
  - Bob Rafelson, 89, film director (Five Easy Pieces, The Postman Always Rings Twice) and television producer (The Monkees) (b. 1933)
- July 24
  - Steve Beaird, 70, American-born Canadian football player (Winnipeg Blue Bombers) (b. 1952)
  - Tim Giago, 88, journalist (Indian Country Today, Rapid City Journal) and founder of the Native American Journalists Association (b. 1934)
  - Michael R. Long, 82, politician, member of the New York City Council (1981–1983) and chairman of the Conservative Party of New York State (1988–2019) (b. 1940)
  - Len Oliver, 88, soccer player (Uhrik Truckers, Ludlow Lusitano, Baltimore Pompei) (b. 1933–1934)
  - Win Remmerswaal, 68, Dutch-born baseball player (Boston Red Sox) (b. 1954)
  - McKinley Washington Jr., 85, politician, member of the South Carolina House of Representatives (1975–1990) and Senate (1990–2000) (b. 1936)
- July 25
  - Jennifer Bartlett, 81, visual artist (b. 1941)
  - Tom Poberezny, 75, aerobatic pilot (b. 1946)
  - Paul Sorvino, 83, actor (Goodfellas, That Championship Season) (b. 1939)
- July 26
  - Paul Garon, 80, writer and blues historian (b. 1942)
- July 27
  - Mary Alice, 85, actress (Fences, A Different World, The Matrix Revolutions), Tony winner (1987) (b. 1936)
  - Luis Morgan Casey, 87, Roman Catholic prelate, auxiliary bishop of La Paz (1983–1988) and apostolic vicar of Pando (1988–2013) (b. 1935)
  - Tony Dow, 77, actor (Leave It to Beaver, The New Leave It to Beaver) and television director (Babylon 5, Coach) (b. 1945)
  - JayDaYoungan, 24, rapper (b. 1998)
  - Larry Josephson, 83, radio host (WBAI), programmer, and engineer (b. 1939)
  - Burt Metcalfe, 87, Canadian-born actor (Father of the Bride, Gidget) and television producer (M*A*S*H) (b. 1935)
  - Joseph F. Murphy Jr., 78, Judge (1993–1996) and Chief Judge (1996–2007) of the Maryland Court of Special Appeals, Judge of the Maryland Court of Appeals (2007–2011) (b. 1944)
  - Ron Sider, 82, Canadian-born theologian and social activist (b. 1939)
- July 28
  - Wayne Hawkins, 84, football player (Oakland Raiders) (b. 1938)
  - William White, 56, football player (Detroit Lions, Kansas City Chiefs, Atlanta Falcons)
- July 29
  - Julian Nava, 95, educator and diplomat, Ambassador to Mexico (1980–1981) (b. 1927)
  - Tom Richmond, 72, cinematographer (Stand and Deliver, Slums of Beverly Hills, Nick & Norah's Infinite Playlist) (b. 1950)
  - Jim Sohns, 75, singer (The Shadows of Knight) (b. 1946)
- July 30
  - Pat Carroll, 95, actress (The Little Mermaid, Freedom Writers, The Danny Thomas Show) and comedian (b. 1927)
  - Nichelle Nichols, 89, actress (Star Trek: The Original Series, Star Trek: The Animated Series, Truck Turner) (b. 1932)
  - Raymond Raposa, 41, singer-songwriter (Castanets) (b. 1981)
- July 31
  - Joseph A. Doorley Jr., 91, politician, mayor of Providence, Rhode Island (1965–1975) (b. 1930)
  - Mo Ostin, 95, Hall of Fame record executive (Warner Records, Reprise Records, Verve Records) (b. 1927)
  - Bill Russell, 88, basketball player and coach (Boston Celtics) (b. 1934)

== August ==
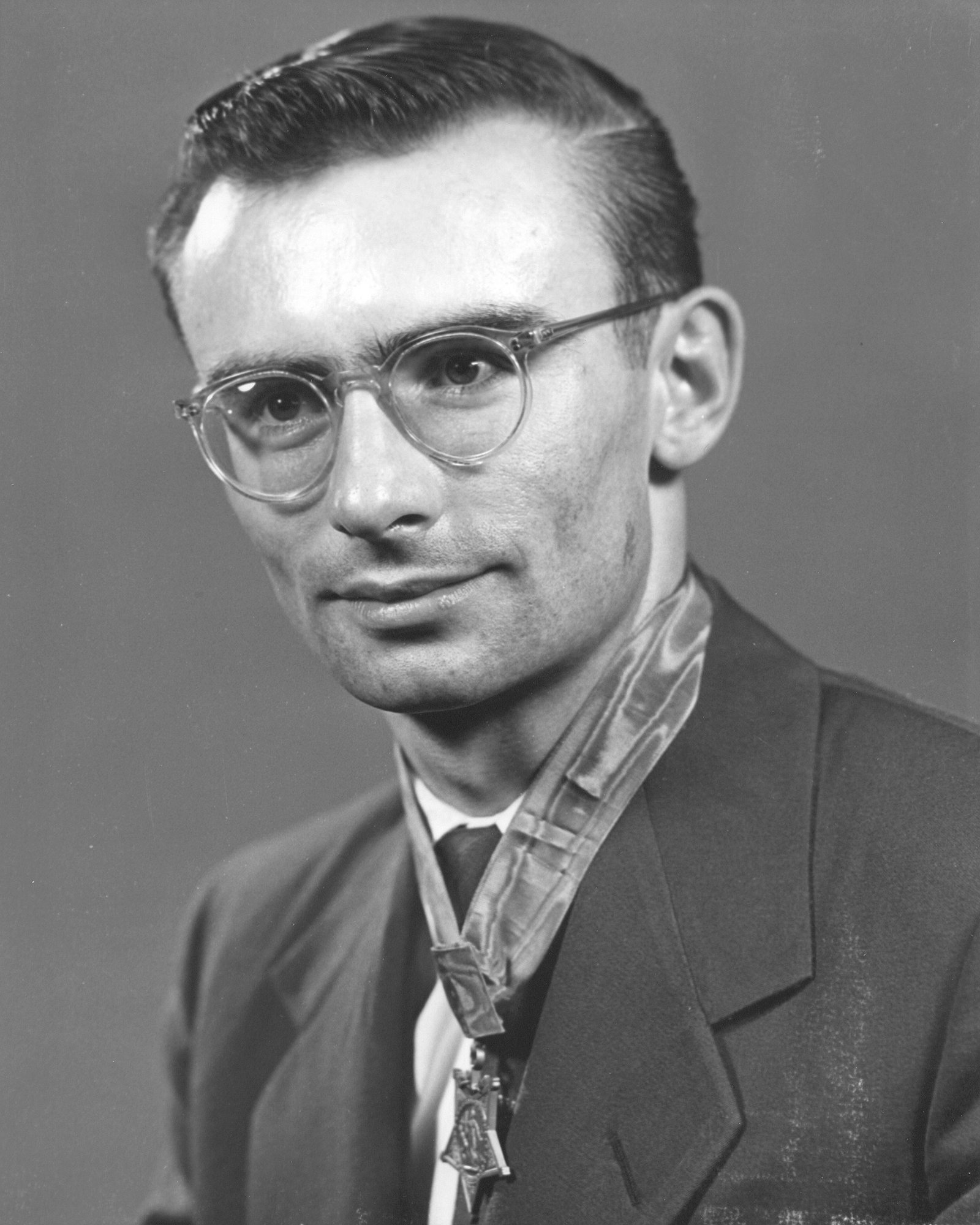
Robert E. Simanek

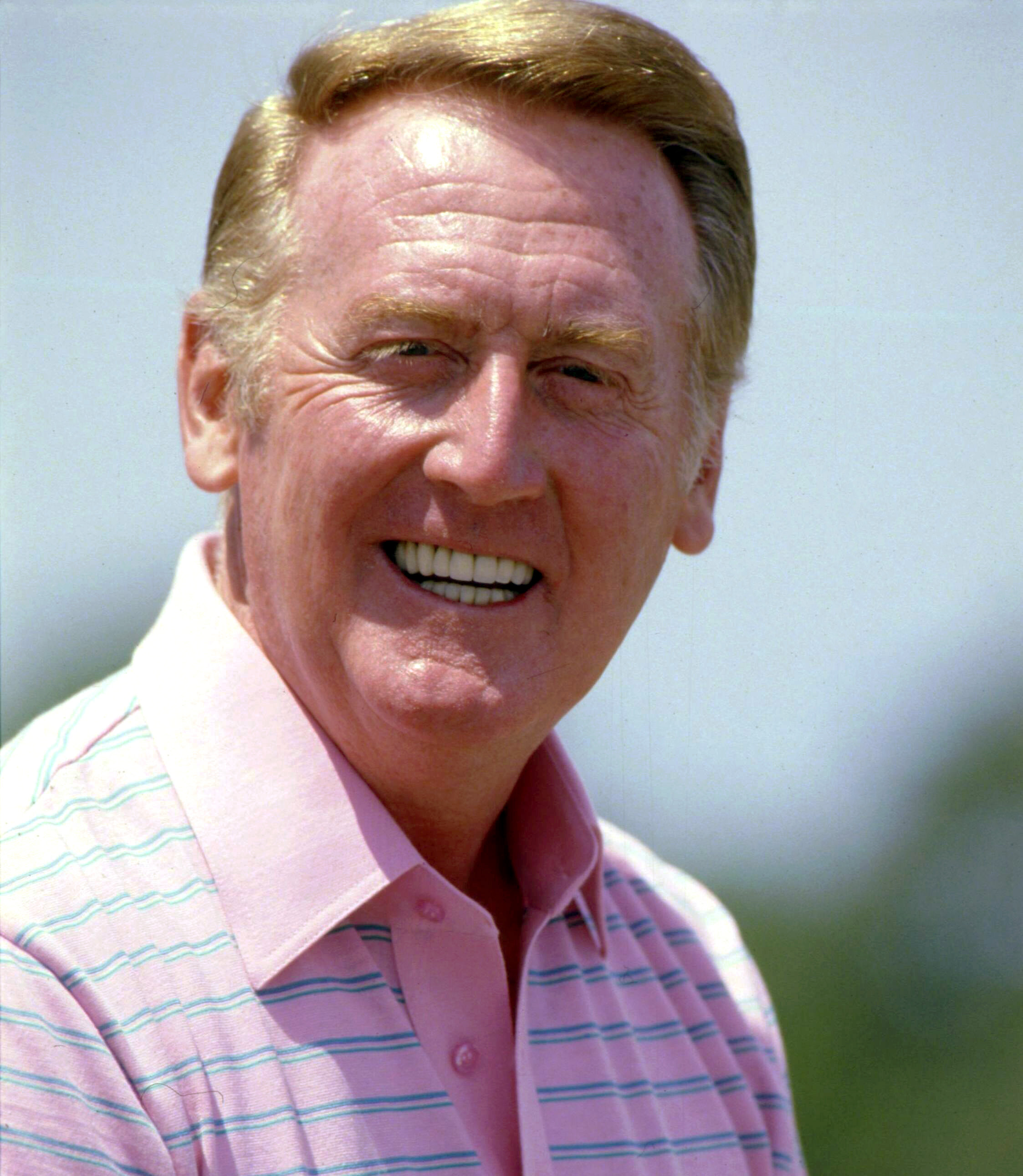
Vin Scully

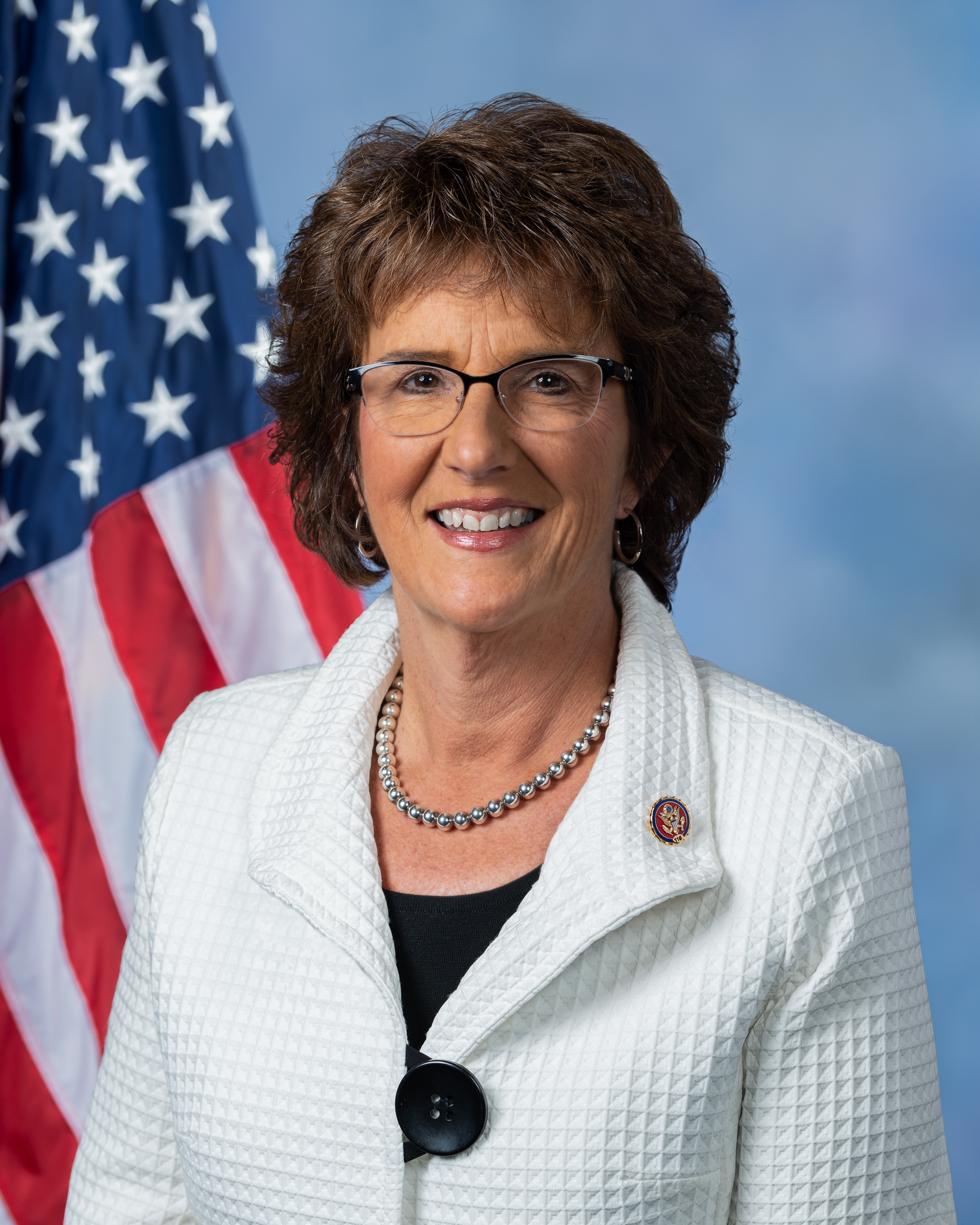
Jackie Walorski

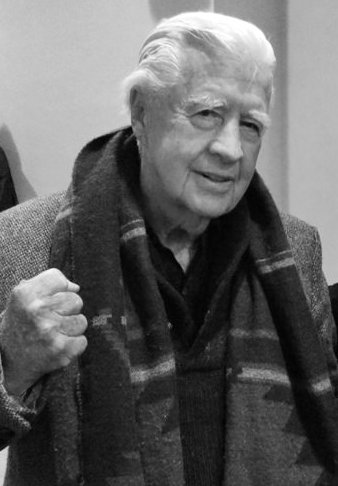
Clu Gulager

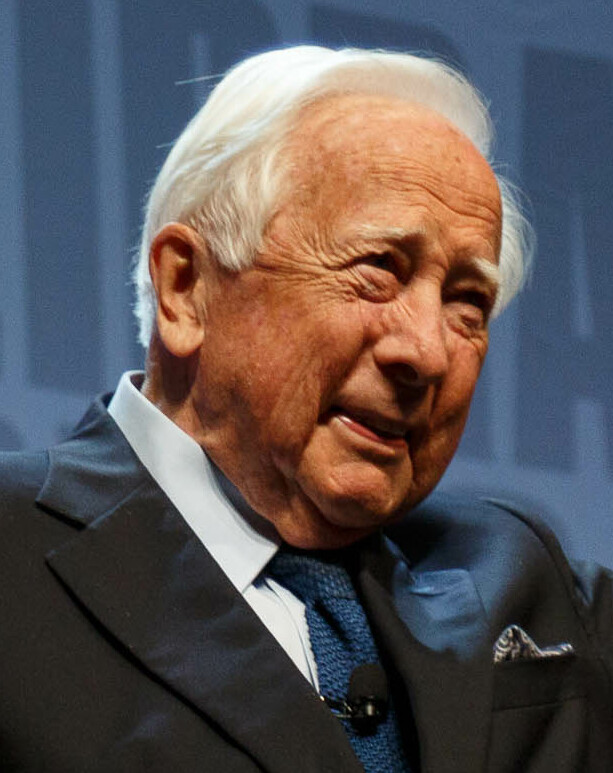
David McCullough

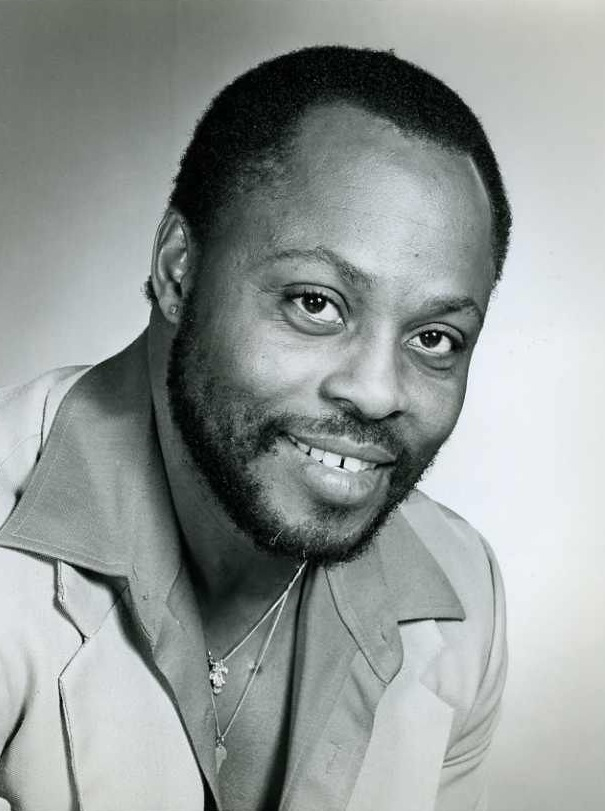
Roger E. Mosley

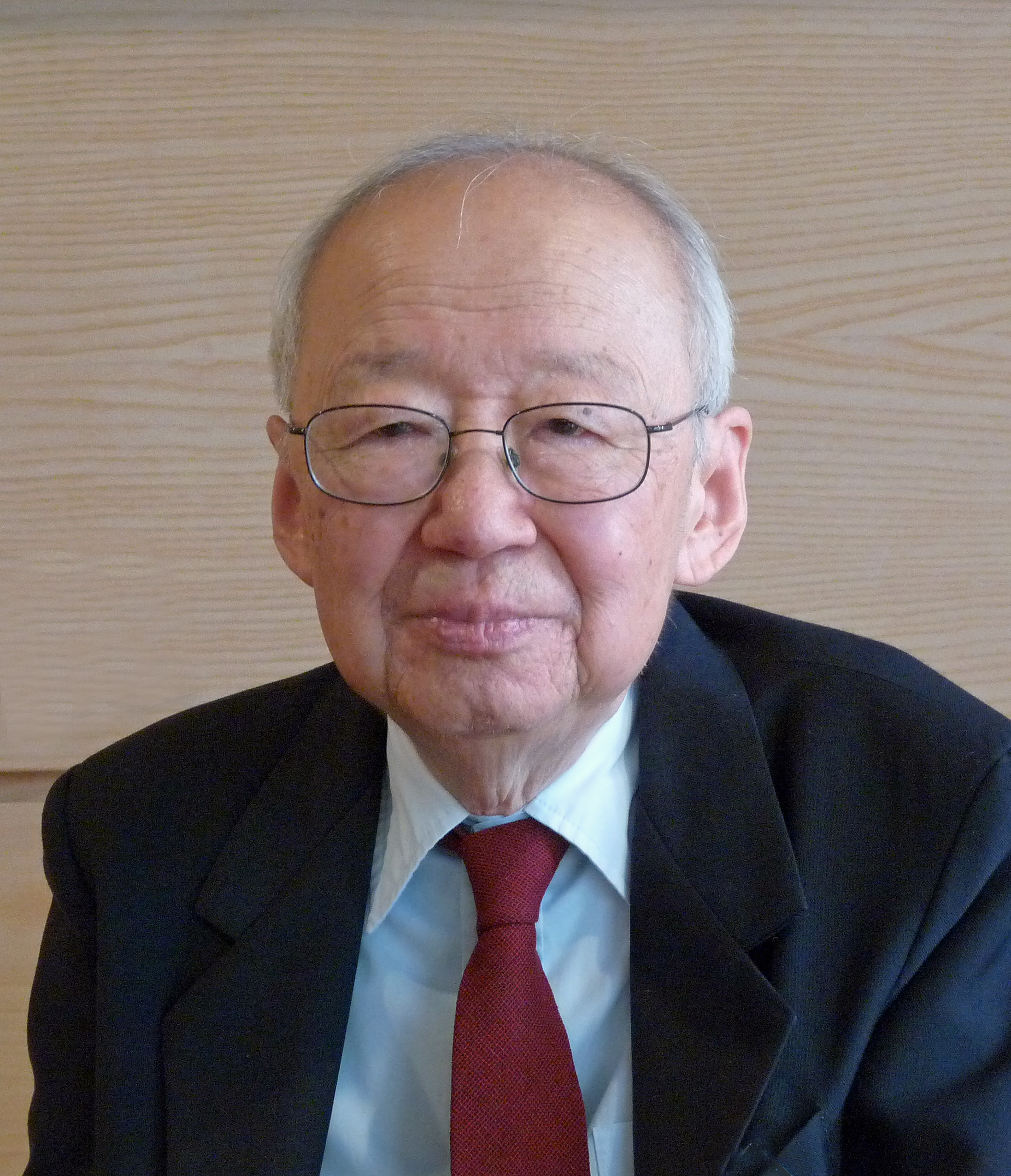
Yi-Fu Tuan

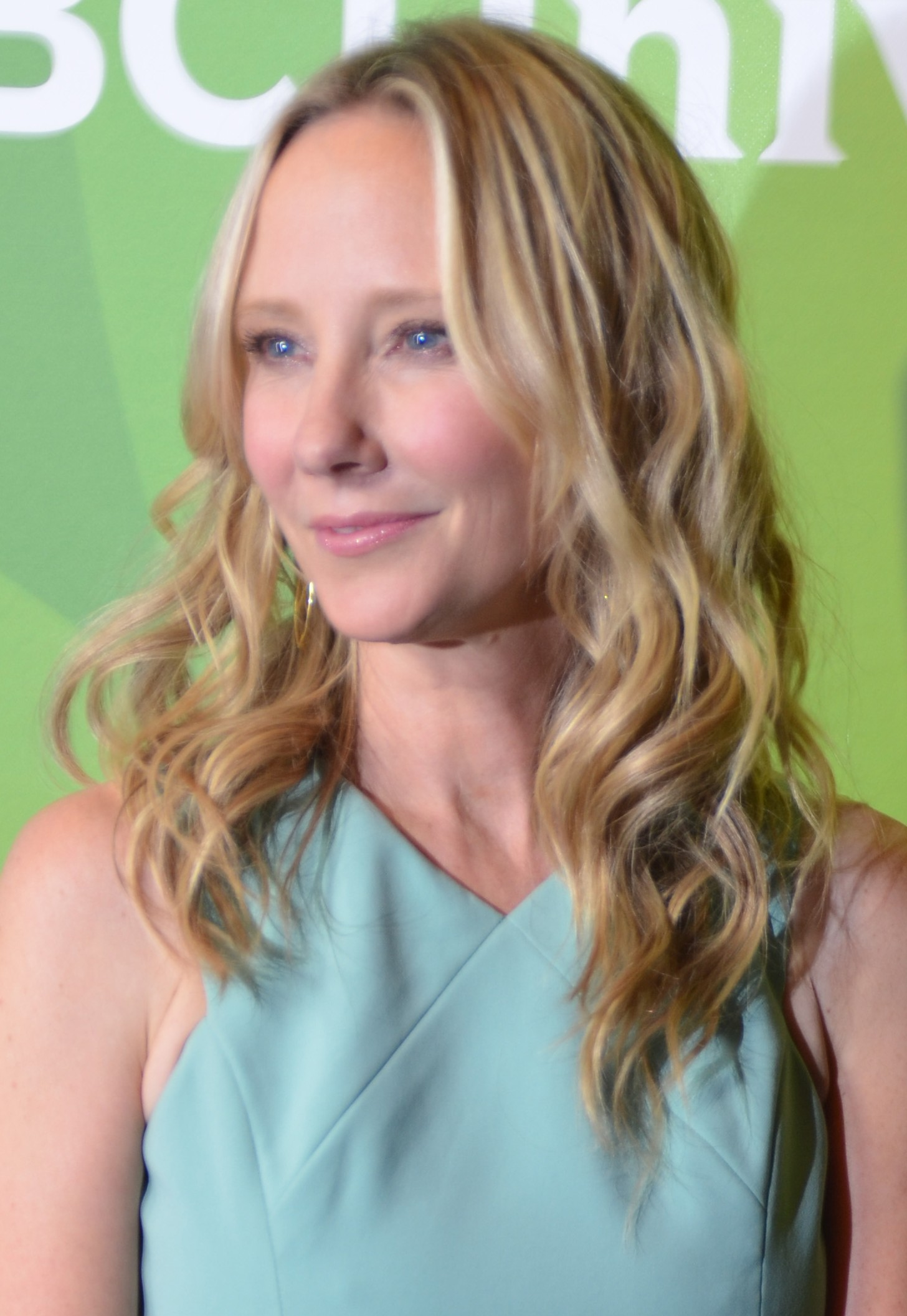
Anne Heche

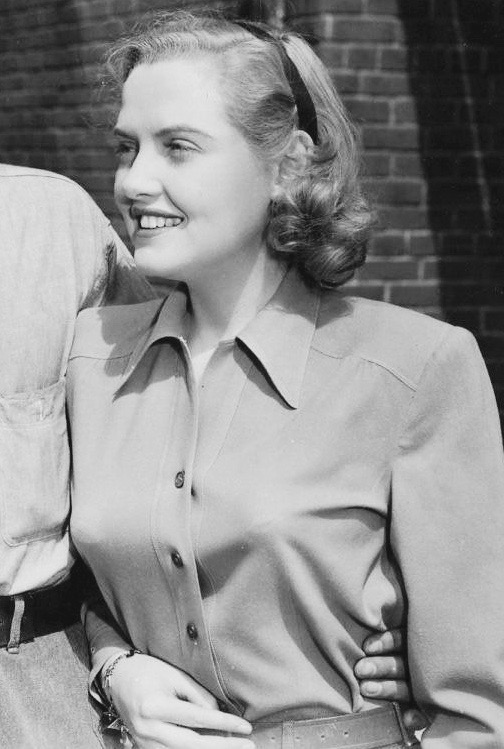
Virginia Patton

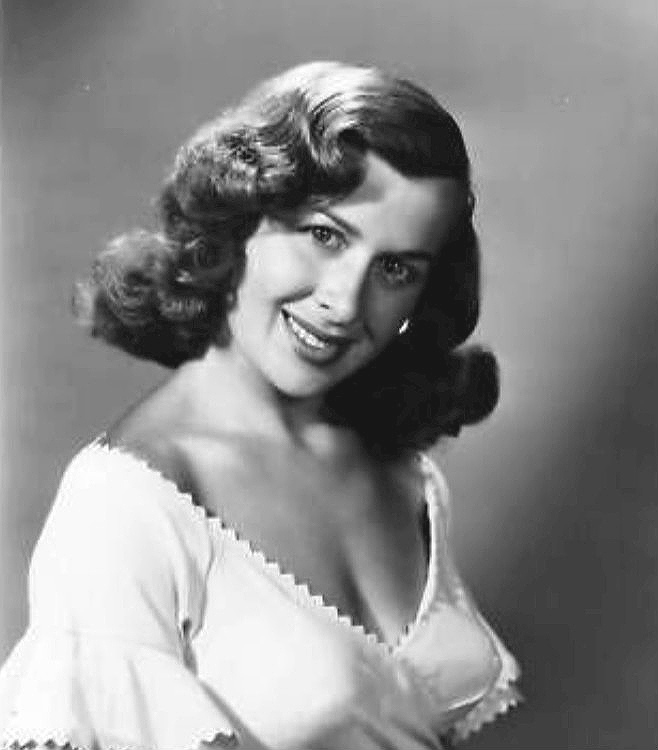
Helen Grayco

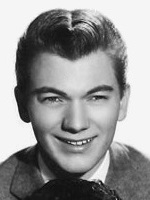
Jerry Allison

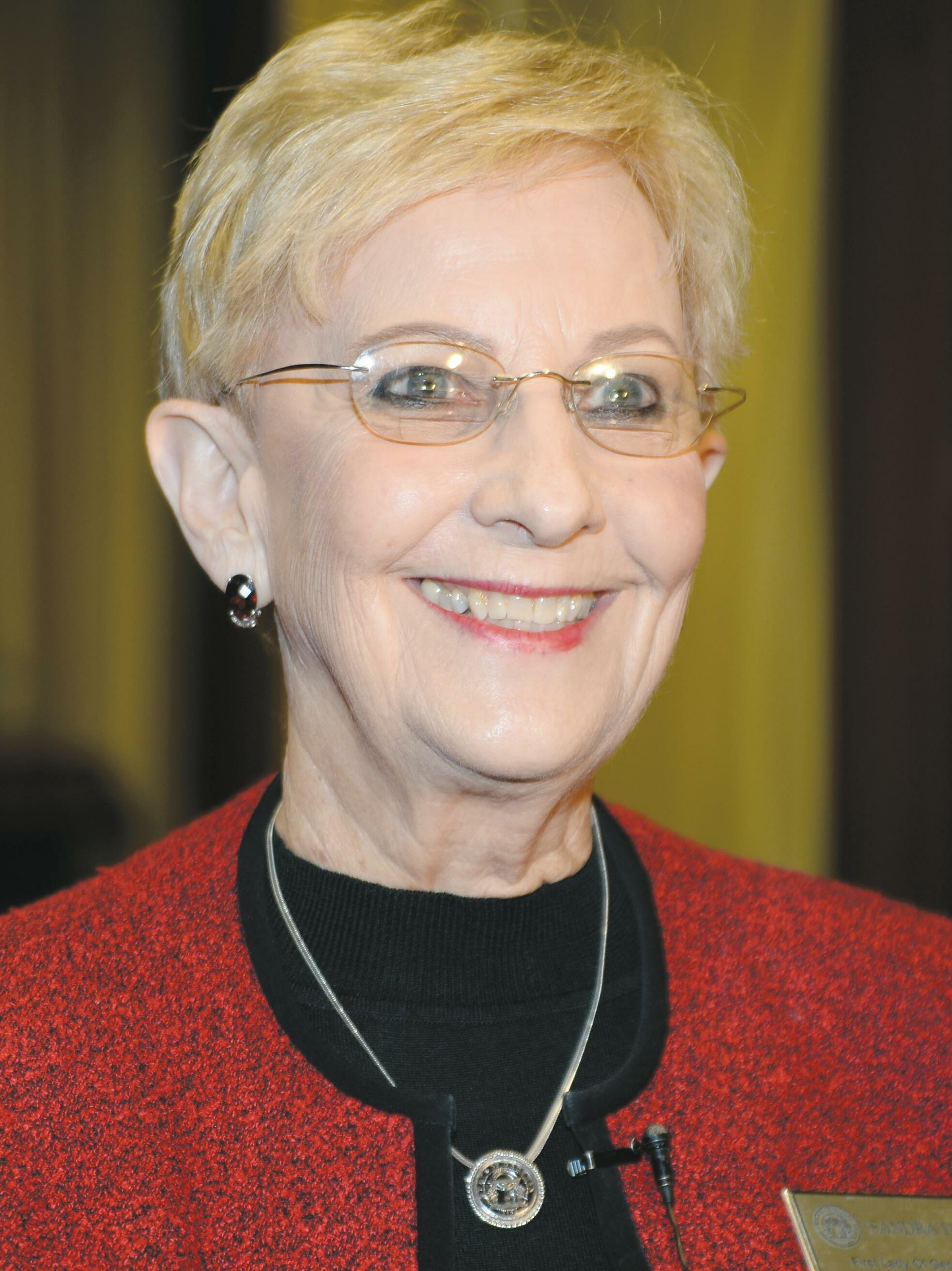
Sandra Deal

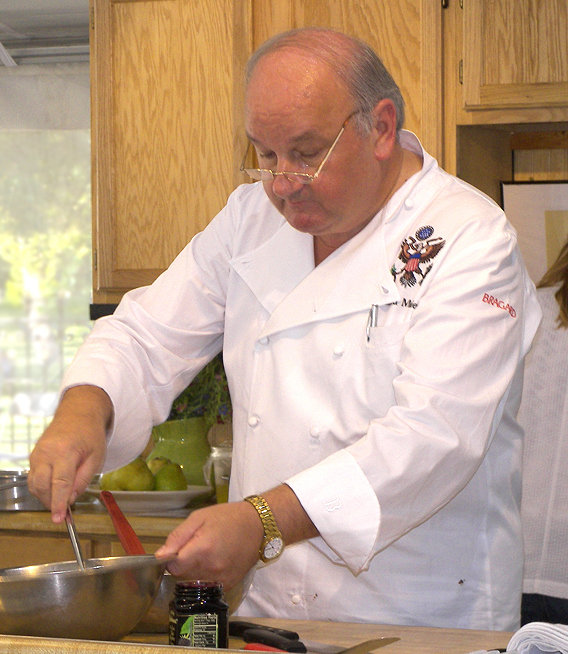
Roland Mesnier

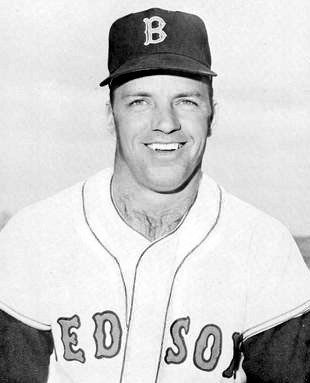
Lee Thomas

- August 1
  - Jack Bowman, 90, politician, member of the Tennessee House of Representatives (1967–1976) (b. 1932)
  - Tom Cornell, 88, peace activist and newspaper editor (Catholic Worker) (b. 1934)
  - C.C. (Doc) Dockery, 89, businessman and author (b. 1933)
  - Paul Eenhoorn, 73, Australian-born actor (This Is Martin Bonner, Land Ho!, Viper Club) (b. 1948)
  - Joseph Mondello, 84, politician and diplomat, ambassador to Trinidad and Tobago (2018–2021) (b. 1938)
  - Gary Schroen, 80, intelligence officer (CIA) (b. 1941)
  - Elaine Schuster, 90, philanthropist and diplomat (b. 1932)
  - Robert E. Simanek, 92, marine and Medal of Honor recipient (1953) (b. 1930)
  - Lars Tate, 56, football player (Georgia Bulldogs, Tampa Bay Buccaneers, Chicago Bears) (b. 1966)
- August 2
  - Buddy Arrington, 84, racing driver (b. 1938)
  - Melissa Bank, 61, writer (The Girls' Guide to Hunting and Fishing) (b. 1960)
  - David Bawden, 62, conclavist, claimant to the papacy (since 1990) (b. 1959)
  - Jimmy Burson, 81, football player (St. Louis Cardinals, Atlanta Falcons) (b. 1940)
  - Vin Scully, 94, Hall of Fame sportscaster (Brooklyn/Los Angeles Dodgers) (b. 1927)
- August 3
  - Stuart Briscoe, 91, English-born evangelical author (b. 1930)
  - Raymond Damadian, 86 physician and inventor (b. 1936)
  - Jack Deloplaine, 68, football player (Pittsburgh Steelers, Washington Redskins, Chicago Bears) (b. 1954)
  - Jan Longone, 89, food historian and writer (b. 1933)
  - Paul X. Rinn, 75, naval captain (b. 1946)
  - Jackie Walorski, 58, politician, member of the U.S. House of Representatives (since 2013) and Indiana House of Representatives (2005–2010) (b. 1963)
- August 4
  - Neil Castles, 87, racing driver (NASCAR) (b. 1934)
  - Daren Gilbert, 58, football player (New Orleans Saints) (b. 1963)
  - Sam Gooden, 87, singer (The Impressions) (b. 1934)
  - Carl Kabat, 88, priest and anti-nuclear weapons activist (b. 1933)
  - J. A. O. Preus III, 69, academic administrator (Concordia University Irvine) (b. 1953)
  - Albert Woodfox, 75, prisoner (Angola Three) (b. 1947)
- August 5
  - Tom Alberg, 82, lawyer and businessman, director of Amazon.com (1996–2019) (b. 1940)
  - Robert Brockman, 81, businessman (Reynolds and Reynolds). (b. 1941)
  - Dean Carlson, 72, football player (Kansas City Chiefs, Green Bay Packers) (b. 1950)
  - John Chandler, 98, educator, president of Hamilton College (1968–1973) and Williams College (1973–1985) (b. 1923)
  - Clu Gulager, 93, actor (The Return of the Living Dead, The Tall Man, The Last Picture Show) (b. 1928)
  - Joseph P. Johnson, 90, politician, member of the Virginia House of Delegates (1966–1970, 1990–2014) (b. 1931)
  - Michael Lang, 80, pianist and composer (b. 1941)
  - Susan Whelchel, 77, politician, mayor of Boca Raton, Florida (2008–2014) (b. 1944)
- August 6
  - Steve Courtin, 79, basketball player (Saint Joseph's Hawks, Philadelphia 76ers) (b. 1942)
  - Buddy Leach, 88, politician, member of the U.S. House of Representatives (1979–1981) and Louisiana House of Representatives (1968–1979, 1984–1988) (b. 1934)
  - David Muse, 73, singer, songwriter and composer (Firefall, The Marshall Tucker Band) (b. 1949)
  - Gene Visscher, 81, college basketball coach (Weber State, Northern Arizona) (b. 1940/1941)
  - John Yanta, 90, Roman Catholic prelate, bishop of Amarillo (1997–2008). (b. 1931)
- August 7
  - Elana Dykewomon, 72, lesbian rights activist and author (b. 1949)
  - Bert Fields, 93, lawyer and author (b. 1929)
  - David McCullough, 89, historian and author (Truman, John Adams), Pulitzer Prize winner (1993, 2002) (b. 1933)
  - Robert Mikhail Moskal, 84, Ukrainian Greek Catholic prelate, bishop of Saint Josaphat in Parma (1984–2009) (b. 1937)
  - Roger E. Mosley, 83, actor (Magnum, P.I., Leadbelly, Terminal Island) (b. 1938)
- August 8
  - Lamont Dozier, 81, Hall of Fame songwriter ("You Can't Hurry Love", "Reach Out I'll Be There"), record producer (Holland–Dozier–Holland) and singer (b. 1941)
  - Daren Gilbert, 58, football player (New Orleans Saints) (b. 1963) (death announced on this date)
  - Uma Pemmaraju, 64, Indian-born journalist and news anchor (Fox News) (b. 1958)
  - Ruby Williams, 94, folk artist and produce vendor (b. 1928)
- August 9
  - John Abdo, 66, health and fitness coach, businessman and nutritionist (b. 1955/1956)
  - Ken Boles, 89, politician, member of the Florida House of Representatives (1978–1982) (b. 1933)
  - Charlie Brandon, 78, football player (Ottawa Rough Riders, Norfolk Neptunes, Winnipeg Blue Bombers) (b. 1943)
  - Della Griffin, 100, jazz vocalist and drummer (b. 1922)
  - Marc Lapadula, 62, playwright, screenwriter and lecturer (Yale University) (b. 1960)
  - Gene LeBell, 89, martial artist, stunt performer, actor, and professional wrestler (b. 1932)
  - Donald Machholz, 69, astronomer, co-inventor of the Messier marathon (b. 1952)
- August 10
  - Ben Farrell, 76, concert promoter (b. 1946)
  - Leslie Griffith, 66, writer and journalist (KTVU) (b. 1956)
  - Dean S. Laird, 101, World War II flying ace (b. 1921)
  - Corky Palmer, 68, college baseball coach (Southern Miss Golden Eagles) (b. 1954)
  - Lawney Reyes, 91, artist (b. 1931)
  - Yi-Fu Tuan, 91, Chinese-born geographer (b. 1930)
  - Abdul Wadud, 75, American cellist (b. 1947)
- August 11
  - Michael Badnarik, 68, software engineer, political activist and radio talk show host (b. 1954)
  - Vahan Chamlian, 96, Armenian born secondhand clothes dealer and philanthropist (b. 1926)
  - Anne Heche, 53, actress (Psycho, Six Days, Seven Nights, Another World) (b. 1969)
  - Cecile Pineda, 89, author (b. 1932)
  - Bill Pitman, 102, guitarist and session musician (The Wrecking Crew) (b. 1920)
  - David Tomassoni, 69, politician, member of the Minnesota House of Representatives (1993–2001), member (since 2001) and president (2020–2021) of the Minnesota Senate (b. 1952)
- August 12
  - Don A. Anderson, 88, politician, member of the Minnesota Senate (1983–1990), and businessman (b. 1934)
  - Richard Caruso, 79, entrepreneur (b. 1943)
  - Togo Palazzi, 90, basketball player (Boston Celtics, Syracuse Nationals) and coach (Holy Cross Crusaders) (b. 1932)
  - Dorli Rainey, 95, political activist (Occupy Seattle) (b. 1927)
- August 13
  - Michael W. Berns, 79, biologist (b. 1942)
  - Denise Dowse, 64, actress (Beverly Hills, 90210, The Guardian, Coach Carter) (b. 1958)
  - Robyn Griggs, 49, actress (One Life to Live, Another World, Zombiegeddon) (b. 1973)
  - David Kay, 82, weapons inspector, lead of the Iraq Survey Group (b. 1940)
  - John Train, 93–94, investment advisor and writer (b. 1928)
  - Steve Worster, 73, football player (Texas Longhorns, Hamilton Tiger-Cats) (b. 1949)
- August 14
  - Robert E. Finnigan, 95, chemist (b. 1927)
  - Donald Foss, 78, businessman, founder of Credit Acceptance (b. 1944)
  - Nina Garsoïan, 99, French-born Armenologist, dean of Princeton University Graduate School (1977–1979) (b. 1923)
  - George Kernek, 82, baseball player (St. Louis Cardinals) (b. 1940)
  - Roger H. Scherer, 87, politician, member of the Minnesota House of Representatives (1967–1972) (b. 1935)
  - Butch Thompson, 78, jazz pianist and clarinetist (b. 1943)
- August 15
  - Frederick Buechner, 96, novelist (A Long Day's Dying, Godric) and theologian (Secrets in the Dark) (b. 1926)
  - Pete Carril, 92, college basketball coach (Reading HS, Lehigh, Princeton) (b. 1930)
  - John Engen, 57, politician, mayor of Missoula (since 2006) (b. 1964)
  - Barbara Kremen, 100, writer (b. 1922)
  - Andrew J. Maloney, 90, attorney (b. 1931)
  - Brian O'Connor, 64, visual artist (b. 1958)
- August 16
  - Kal David, 79, blues guitarist and singer (b. 1943)
  - Robert Finn, 100, mathematician (b. 1922)
  - Charley Frazier, 83, football player (Houston Oilers, Boston Patriots) (b. 1939)
  - Doug Ross, 70, college ice hockey player (Bowling Green) and coach (Kent State, Alabama-Huntsville). (b. 1951)
  - Wayne Yates, 84, basketball player (Los Angeles Lakers, Oakland Oaks) and coach (Memphis State Tigers) (b. 1937)
- August 17
  - Jim Mueller, 79, sportscaster (Cleveland Browns) (b. 1943)
  - Maureen Ogden, 93, politician, member of the New Jersey General Assembly (1982–1996) (b. 1928)
- August 18
  - Clayton Jacobson II, 88, inventor, developer of the jet ski (b. 1933)
  - Robert Q. Lovett, 95, film editor (The Next Man, Just Before Dawn, The Cotton Club) (b. 1927)
  - Herbert Mullin, 75, serial killer (b. 1947)
  - Tom Palmer, 81, comic book artist (The Tomb of Dracula, Batman, The Avengers) (b. 1941)
  - Virginia Patton, 97, actress (It's a Wonderful Life, Black Eagle, The Lucky Stiff) (b. 1925)
  - John Powell, 75, discus thrower, Olympic bronze medalist (1976, 1984) (b. 1947)
- August 19
  - Warren Bernhardt, 83, jazz pianist (Steps Ahead, Steely Dan) (b. 1938)
  - Ted Kirkpatrick, 62, musician (Tourniquet), (b. 1960)
  - Mildred Kornman, 97, actress (Our Gang) and model (b. 1925)
  - Michael Malone, 79–80, author and television writer (Another World, One Life to Live) (b. 1942)
  - Riddick Parker, 49, football player (Seattle Seahawks, Baltimore Ravens, New England Patriots) (b. 1972)
  - John Tirman, 72, political theorist, cardiac arrest (b. 1949)
  - John Wockenfuss, 73, baseball player (Detroit Tigers, Philadelphia Phillies) (b. 1949)
- August 20
  - Theodore Bugas, 98, politician, member of the Oregon House of Representatives (1977–1983) (b. 1924)
  - Gail Finney, 63, politician, member of the Kansas House of Representatives (since 2009) (b. 1959)
  - Helen Grayco, 97, singer (The Spike Jones Show) and actress (That Certain Age, A Night at the Opera) (b. 1924)
  - Bill Haller, 87, baseball umpire (b. 1935)
  - Tom Weiskopf, 79, golfer (PGA Tour) (b. 1942)
  - Dean Westlake, 62, politician, member of the Alaska House of Representatives (2017) (b. 1960)
- August 21
  - Alexei Panshin, 82, writer and science fiction critic (b. 1940)
  - Jamey Rootes, 55, sports executive (Houston Texans, Columbus Crew) (b. 1967)
  - Monnette Sudler, 70, jazz guitarist (b. 1952)
- August 22
  - Jerry Allison, 82, Hall of Fame drummer (The Crickets) and songwriter ("That'll Be the Day", "Peggy Sue") (b. 1939)
  - Jaimie Branch, 39, jazz trumpeter and composer (b. 1983)
  - Gary Gaines, 73, football coach (Abilene Christian, Permian), subject of Friday Night Lights (b. 1949)
  - Rembert Weakland, 95, Roman Catholic prelate, archbishop of Milwaukee (1977–2002) (b. 1927)
- August 23
  - Sandra Deal, 80, education advocate, first lady of Georgia (2011–2019) (b. 1942)
  - Julian Robertson, 90, hedge fund manager and philanthropist (b. 1932)
  - Creed Taylor, 93, record producer (b. 1929)
- August 24
  - Len Dawson, 87, Hall of Fame football player (Pittsburgh Steelers, Cleveland Browns, Kansas City Chiefs) and broadcaster (Inside the NFL) (b. 1935)
  - Charlie Finch, 68, art critic (b. 1953/1954)
  - Lily Renée, 101, Austrian-born comic book artist (b. 1921)
  - William Reynolds, 90, actor (The F.B.I.) (b. 1931)
  - Joe E. Tata, 85, actor (Beverly Hills, 90210, Unholy Rollers, The Rockford Files) (b. 1936)
- August 25
  - Joey DeFrancesco, 51, jazz musician (b. 1970)
  - Ron Hutcherson, 79, racing driver (b. 1943)
  - Mable John, 91, singer ("Your Good Thing (Is About to End)") (b. 1930)
  - Dale Joseph Melczek, 83, Roman Catholic prelate, auxiliary bishop of Detroit (1983–1992) and bishop of Gary (1996–2014) (b. 1938)
- August 26
  - Roland Mesnier, 78, French-born chef and author, White House Executive Pastry Chef (1980–2004) (b. 1944)
- August 27
  - Robert LuPone, 76, actor (Jesus Christ Superstar, The Sopranos, A Chorus Line) (b. 1946)
  - Amanda Mackey, 70, casting director (The Fugitive, A League of Their Own, The Hunt for Red October) (b. 1951)
- August 28
  - Ralph Eggleston, 56, art director (The Lion King), production designer (WALL-E) and film director (For the Birds), Oscar winner (2001) (b. 1965)
  - Tucker Wiard, 80, television editor (Murphy Brown, The Carol Burnett Show, Alice), five-time Emmy winner (b. 1941)
- August 29
  - Luke Bell, 32, country singer-songwriter (b. 1990) (body discovered on this date)
  - Gwendolyn Midlo Hall, 93, historian (b. 1929)
  - Ernie Zampese, 86, football coach (San Diego Chargers, San Diego State Aztecs) (b. 1936)
- August 30
  - Eve Borsook, 92, Canadian-born art historian, teacher and author (b. 1929)
  - Elizabeth Gunn, 95, mystery author (b. 1927)
  - Ron Logan, 84, businessman (Disney Live Entertainment) (b. 1938)
  - Steve White, 48, football player (Tampa Bay Buccaneers, New York Jets) and blogger (SB Nation) (b. 1973)
- August 31
  - Lee Thomas, 86, baseball player (Boston Red Sox, Los Angeles Angels) and executive (Philadelphia Phillies) (b. 1936)

== September ==
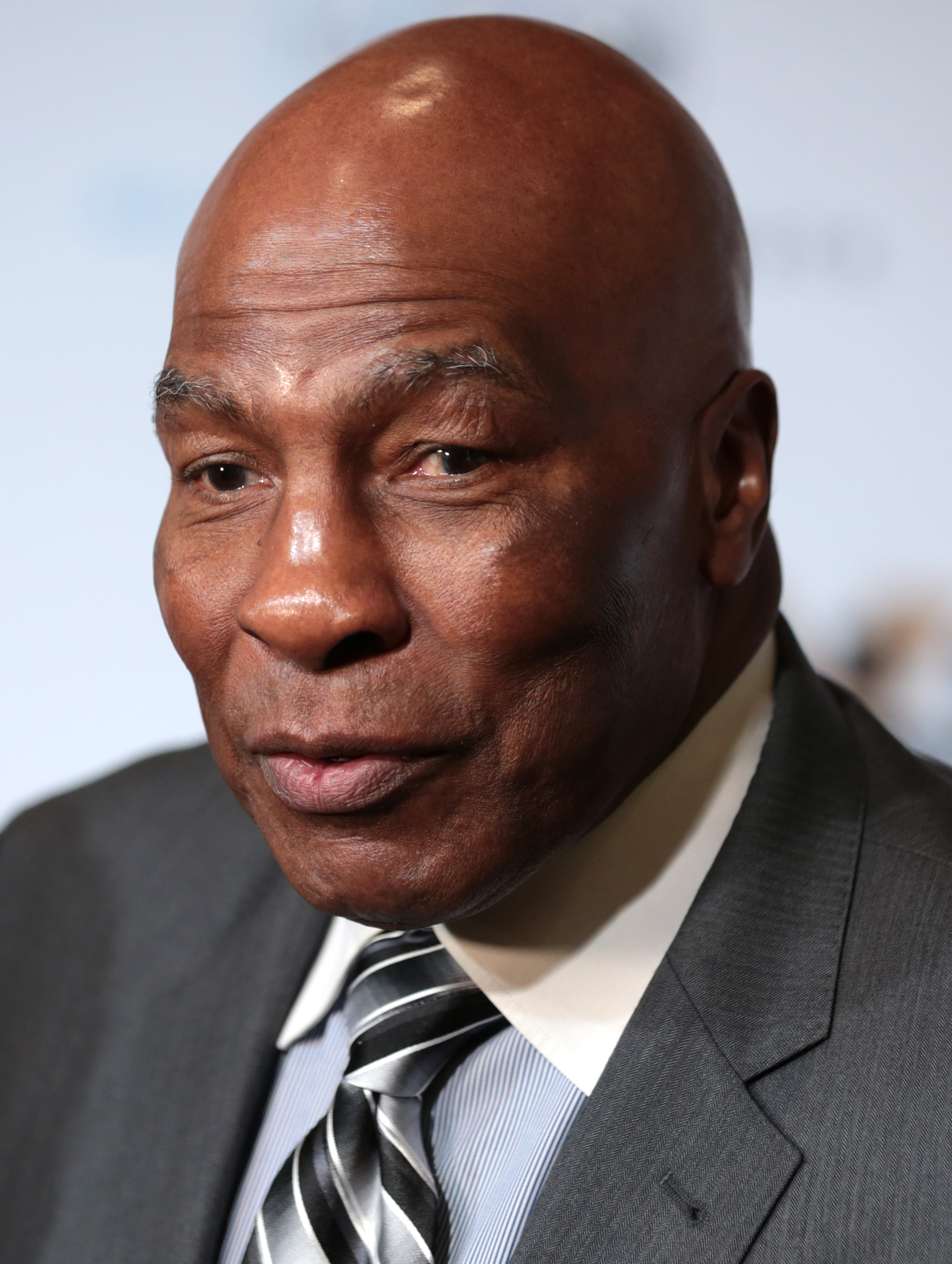
Earnie Shavers

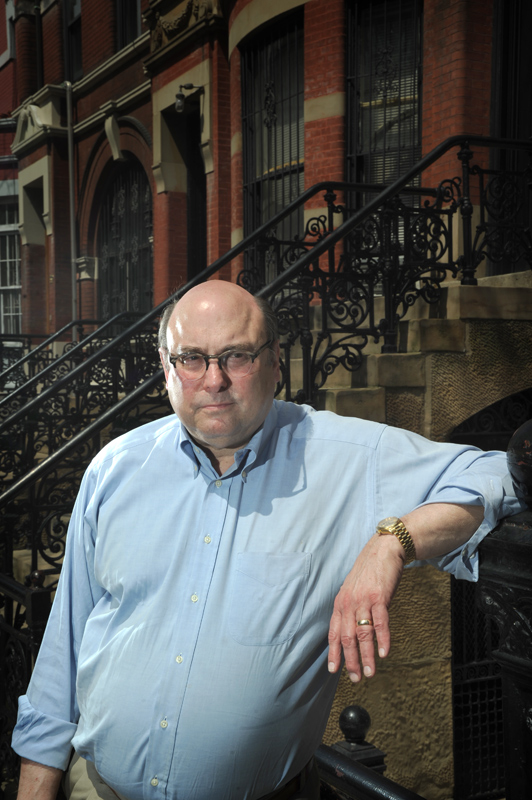
Peter Straub

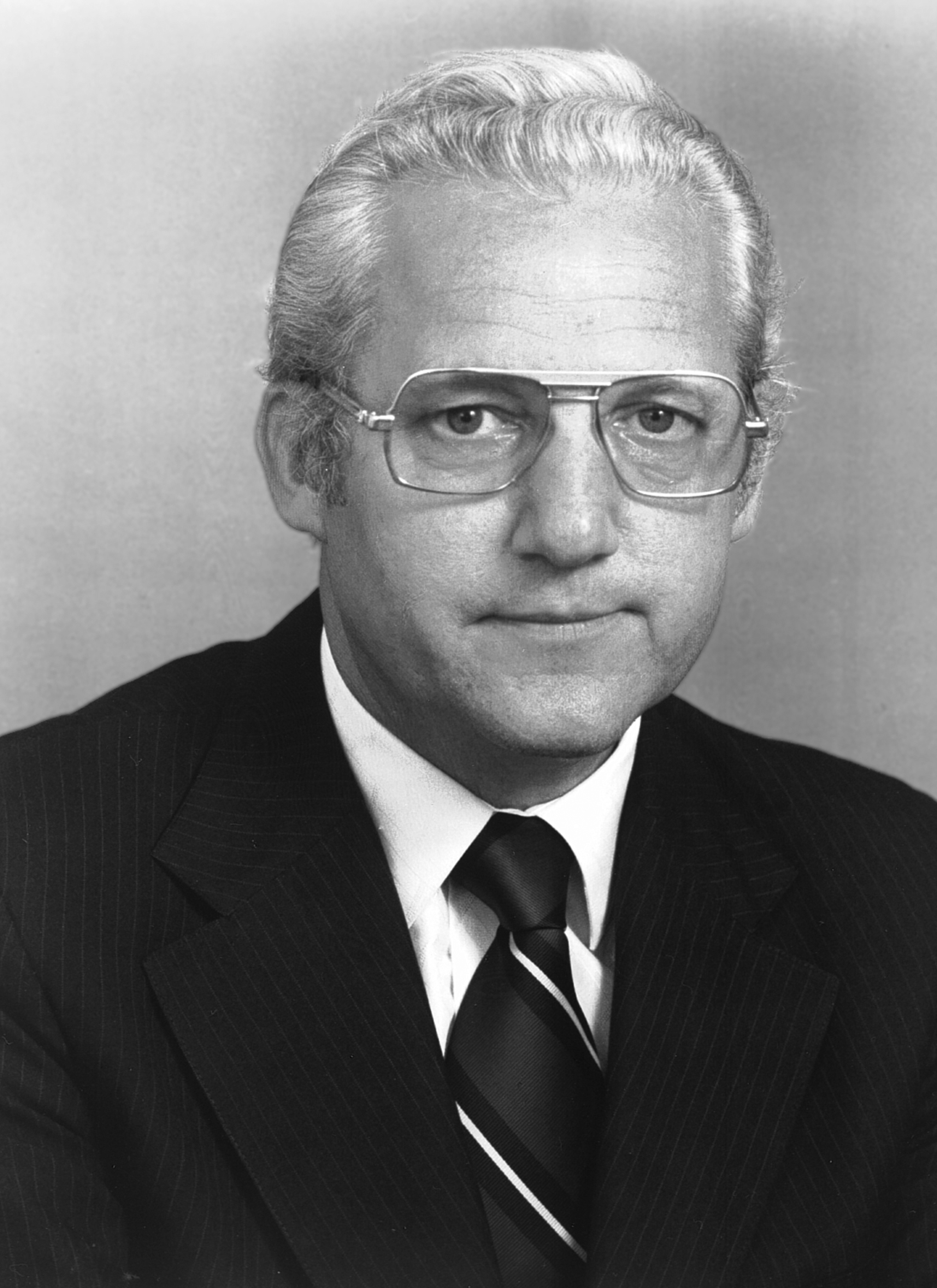
Moon Landrieu

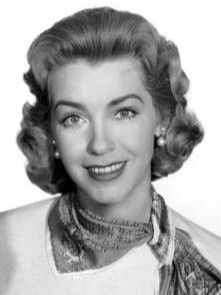
Marsha Hunt

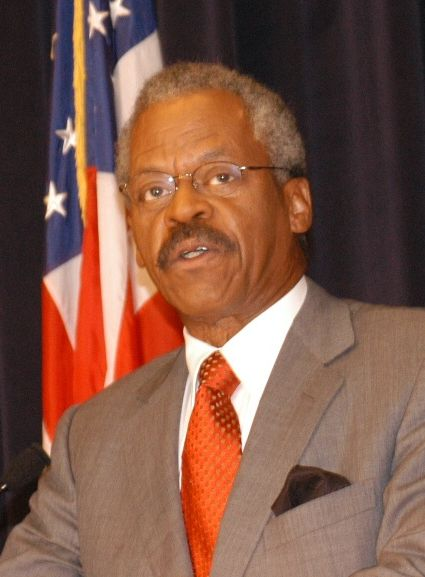
Bernard Shaw

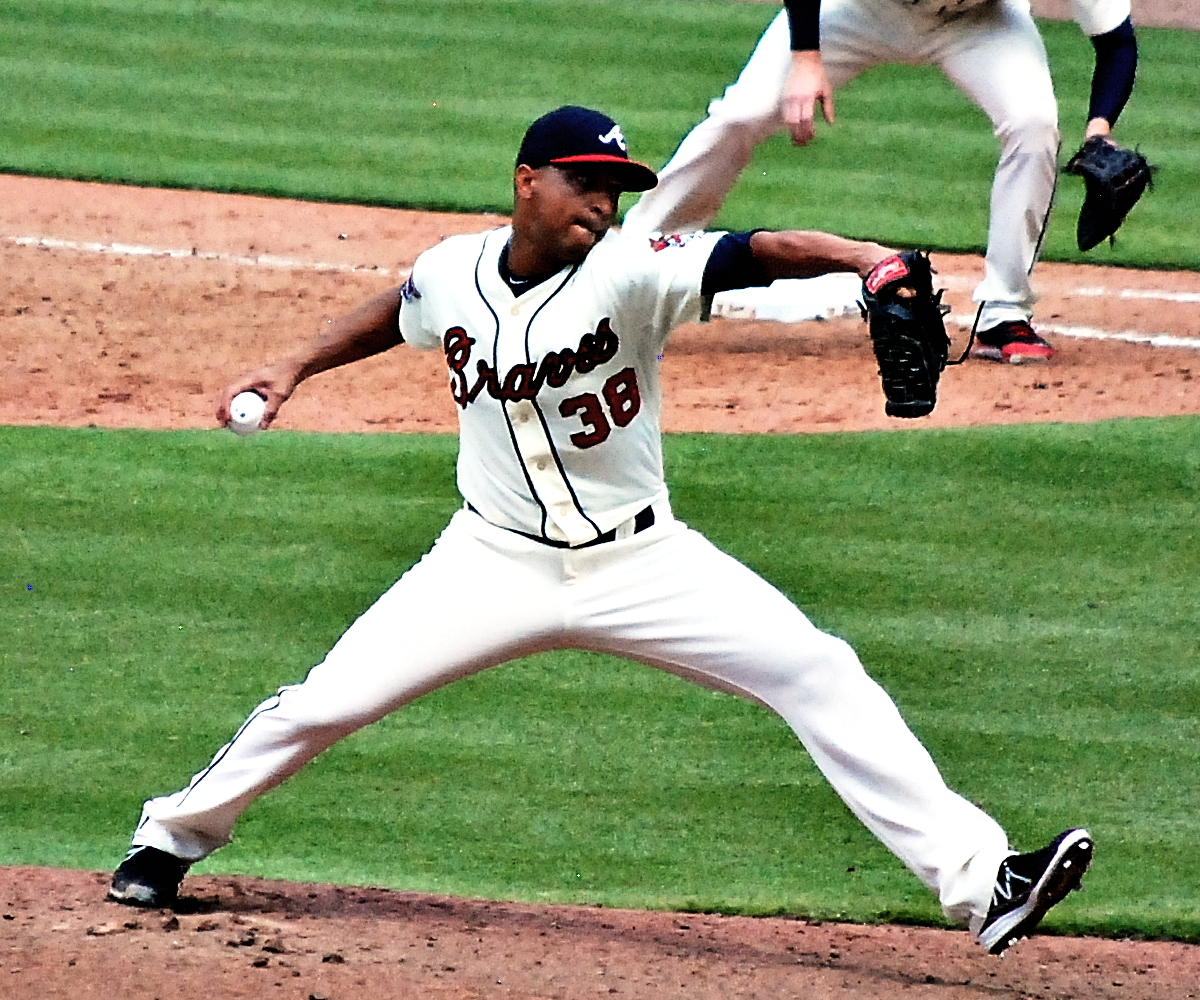
Anthony Varvaro

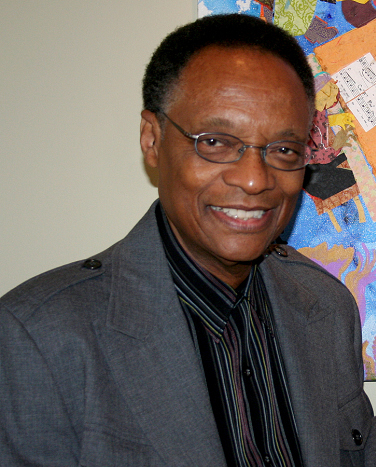
Ramsey Lewis

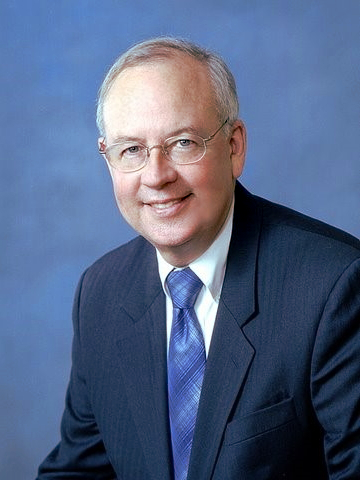
Ken Starr

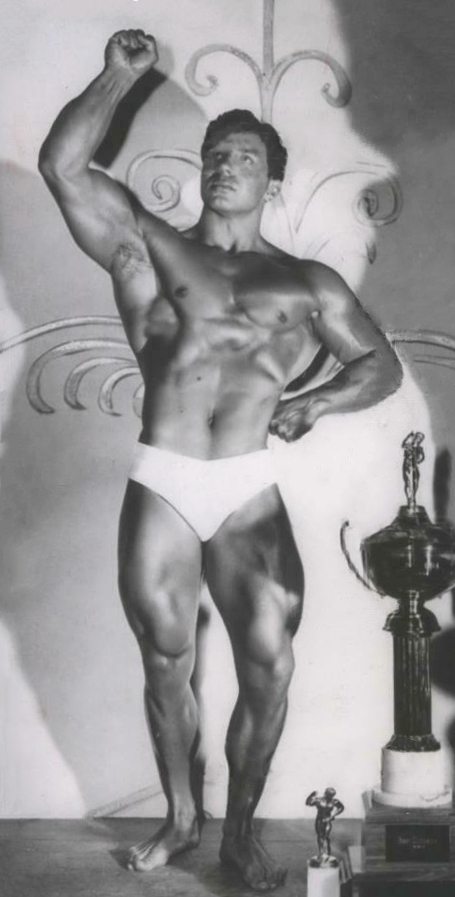
Bill Pearl

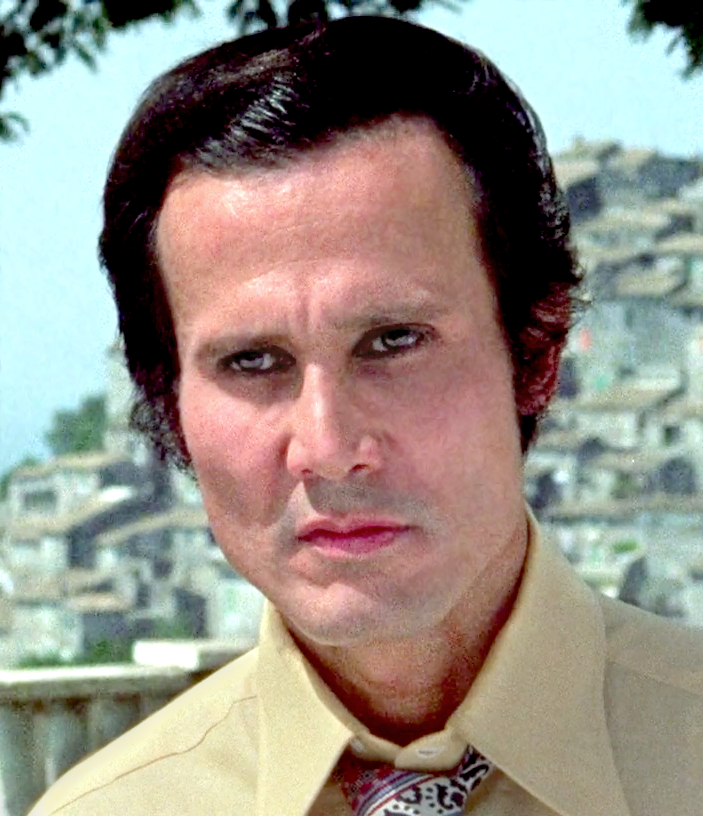
Henry Silva

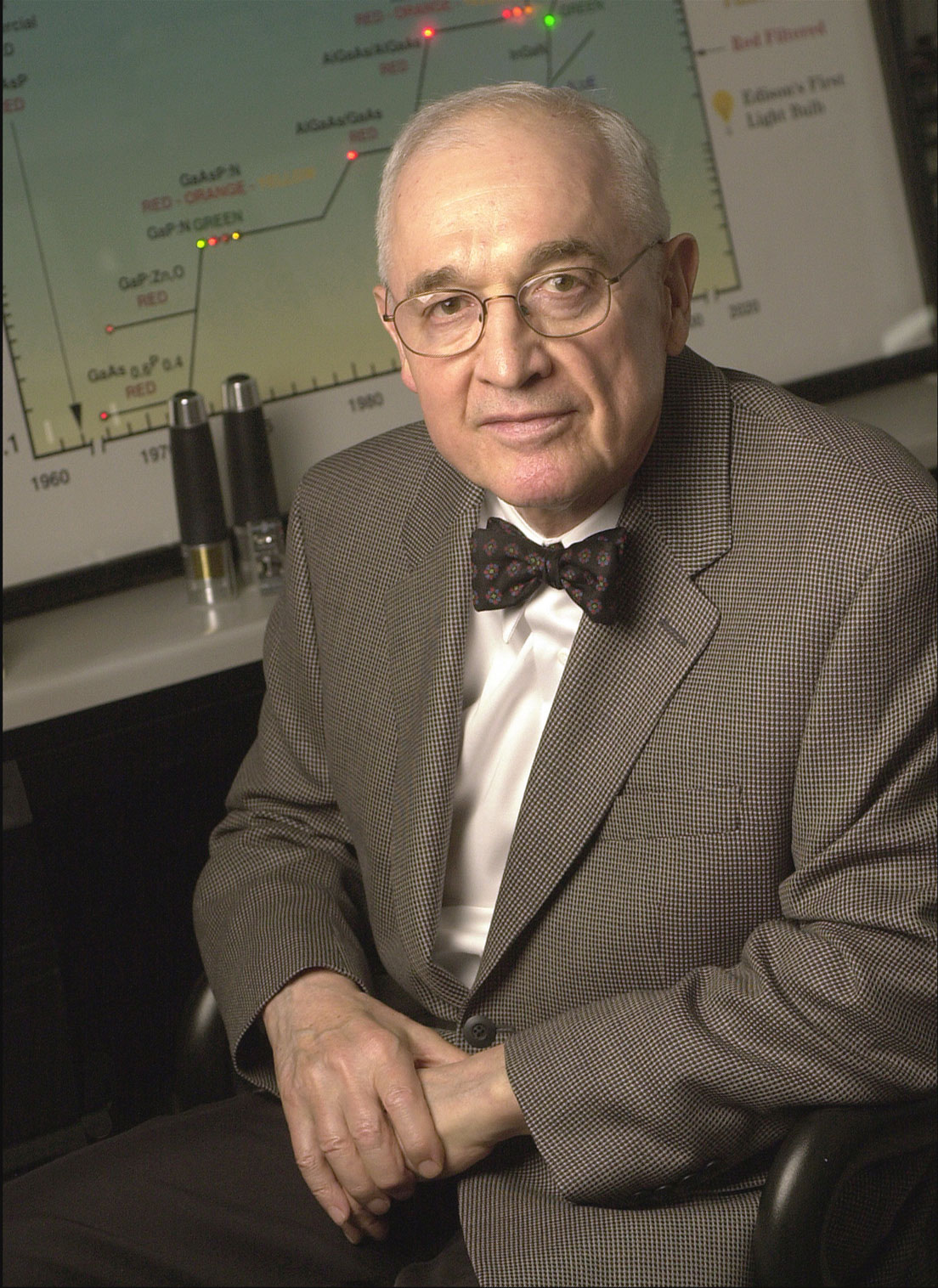
Nick Holonyak

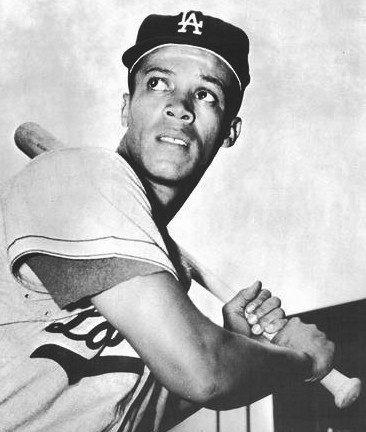
Maury Wills

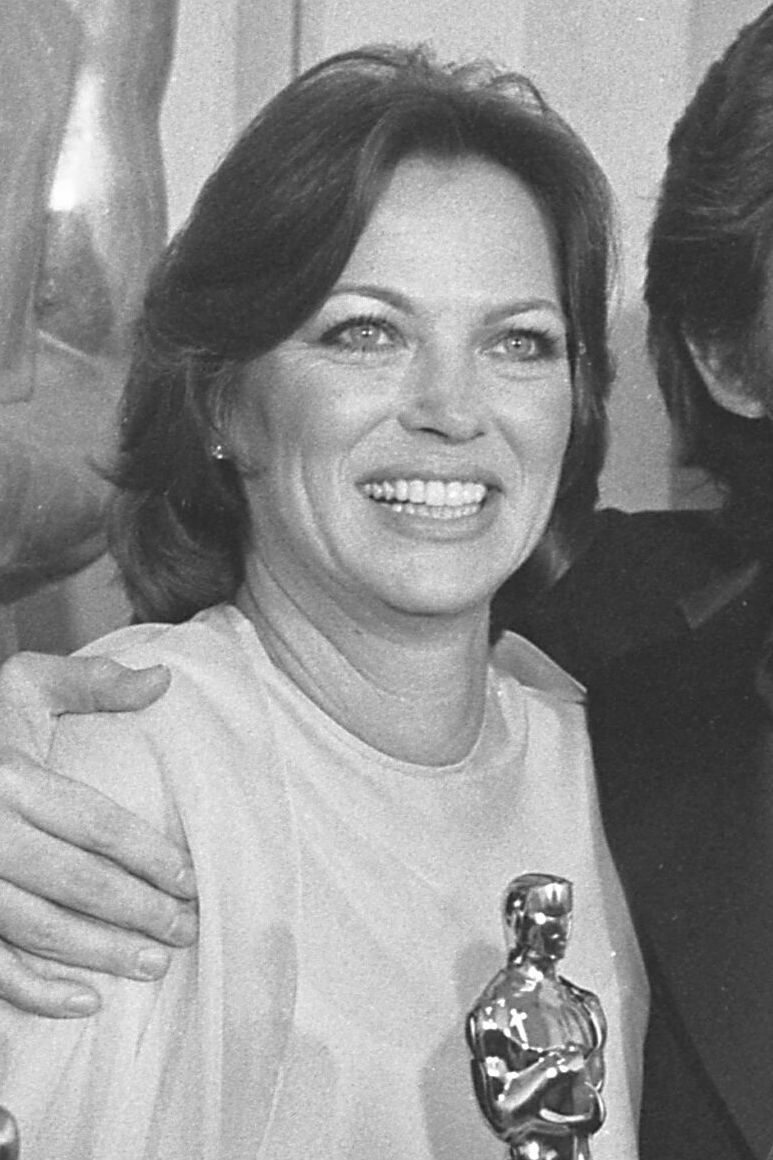
Louise Fletcher

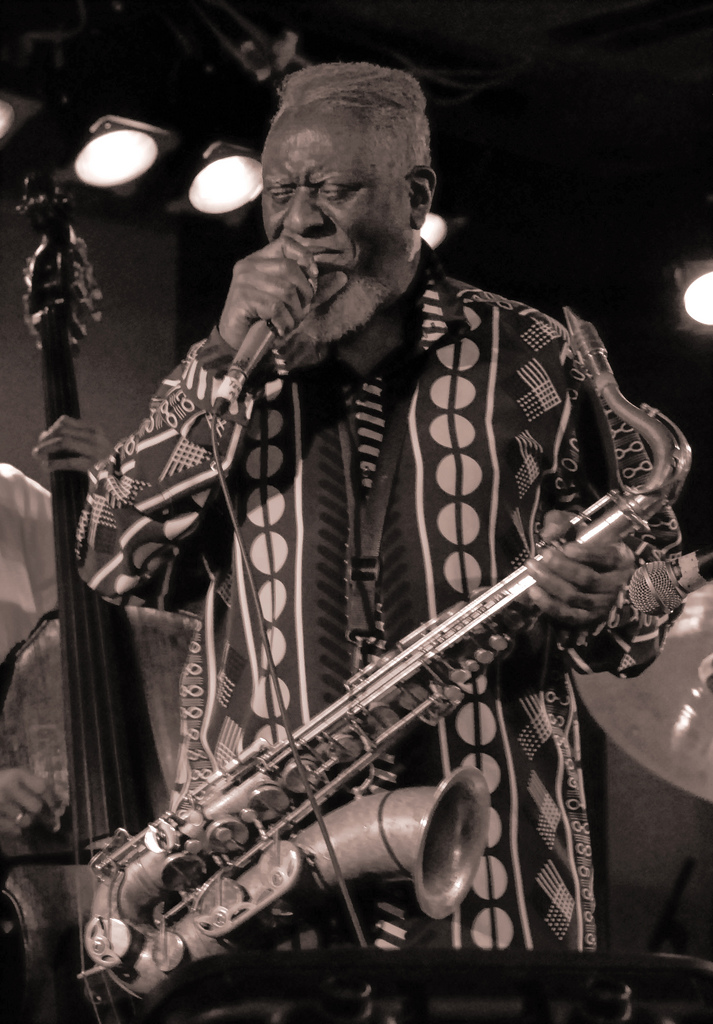
Pharoah Sanders

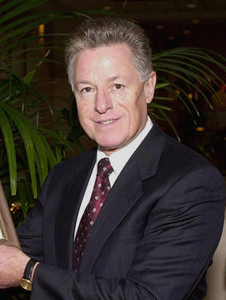
James Florio

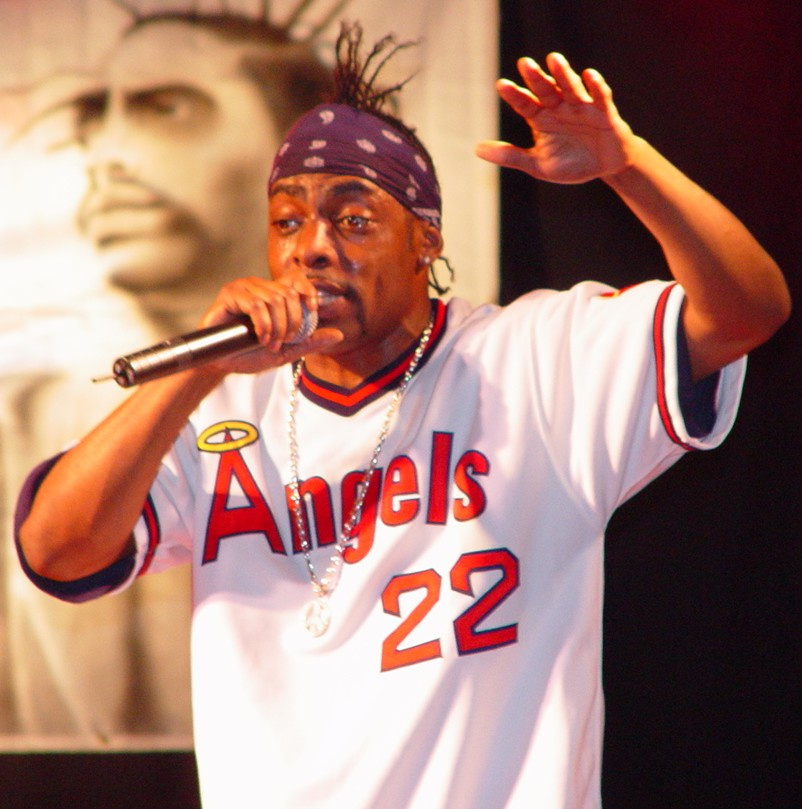
Coolio

- September 1
  - John Dapcevich, 95, politician, mayor of Sitka, Alaska (1971–1975, 1979–1985, 1987–1989) (b. 1926)
  - Barbara Ehrenreich, 81, author and political activist (b. 1941)
  - John Gamble, 74, baseball player (Detroit Tigers) (b. 1948)
  - Diane Noomin, 75, underground cartoonist and editor (Wimmen's Comix, Twisted Sisters) (b. 1947)
  - Earnie Shavers, 78, boxer (b. 1944)
  - Robert L. Vining Jr., 91, lawyer, judge of the U.S. District Court for Northern Georgia (since 1979) (b. 1931)
  - Kenneth Wernicke, 89, aerospace engineer (b. 1932)
- September 2
  - Frank Drake, 92, astronomer and astrophysicist (Drake equation), designer of the Arecibo message (b. 1930)
- September 3
  - Jeff German, 69, journalist (Las Vegas Review-Journal) (b. 1953)
  - Specs Howard, 96, radio presenter (b. 1926)
  - Herbert Kohler Jr., 83, manufacturing executive, chairman of Kohler Co. (1972–2015) (b. 1939)
  - Sterling Lord, 102, literary agent (b. 1920)
- September 4
  - Wes Freed, 58, outsider artist (b. 1964)
  - Helen Matthews Lewis, 97, sociologist, historian, and activist (b. 1924)
  - Arthur Cotton Moore, 87, architect (b. 1935)
  - Art Rosenbaum, 83, visual artist and musician, Grammy winner (2008) (b. 1938)
  - Peter Straub, 79, novelist (Julia, Ghost Story, The Talisman) (b. 1943)
- September 5
  - Virginia Dwan, 90, art collector and patron (b. 1931)
  - Moon Landrieu, 92, politician, secretary of housing and urban development (1979–1981), mayor of New Orleans (1970–1978), and member of the Louisiana House of Representatives (1960–1966) (b. 1930)
  - Mark Littell, 69, baseball player (Kansas City Royals, St. Louis Cardinals) (b. 1953)
- September 6
  - Herman, 90, Orthodox prelate, primate of the church in America (2002–2008) (b. 1932)
  - Vic Kohring, 64, politician, member of the Alaska House of Representatives (1995–2007) (b. 1958)
  - Guy Morriss, 71, football player (Philadelphia Eagles, New England Patriots) and coach (Kentucky) (b. 1951)
  - Ronald Pelton, 80, intelligence analyst (NSA) and convicted spy (b. 1941)
  - Tina Ramirez, 92, Venezuelan-born dancer and choreographer (b. 1929)
  - Dan Schachte, 64, ice hockey linesman (NHL) (b. 1958)
  - Sydney Shoemaker, 90, philosopher (b. 1931)
  - Earl J. Silbert, 86, lawyer (Watergate scandal) (b. 1936)
- September 7
  - David A. Arnold, 54, comedian and television writer (Fuller House, The Rickey Smiley Show, That Girl Lay Lay) (b. 1968)
  - James L. Fisher, 91, academic administrator and psychologist (b. 1931)
  - Anne Garrels, 71, journalist (NPR, ABC News, NBC News) (b. 1951)
  - Marsha Hunt, 104, actress (Pride and Prejudice, Blossoms in the Dust, The Human Comedy) (b. 1917)
  - Lance Mackey, 52, dog musher, four-time Iditarod champion (2007–2010) and Yukon Quest champion (2005–2008) (b. 1970)
  - Rommy Hunt Revson, 78, nightclub singer, inventor of the scrunchie (b. 1944)
  - Bernard Shaw, 82, journalist (CNN) (b. 1940)
- September 8
  - LaDeva Davis, 78, television host and food educator (b. 1944)
  - Albert J. Dooley, 92, politician, member of the South Carolina House of Representatives (1959–1964) and Senate (1971–1976) (b. 1930)
  - Ted Schreiber, 84, baseball player (New York Mets) (b. 1938)
  - Susan L. Solomon, 71, health activist and lawyer (b. 1951)
  - Sonny West, 85, songwriter ("Oh, Boy!", "Rave On") and musician.(b. 1937)
- September 9
  - Jack Ging, 90, actor (The A-Team, The Eleventh Hour, High Plains Drifter) (b. 1931)
  - Shelby Jordan, 70, football player (New England Patriots, Los Angeles Raiders) (b. 1952)
  - Mark Miller, 97, actor (Please Don't Eat the Daisies, Guestward, Ho!, Savannah Smiles) (b. 1924)
  - James Polshek, 92, architect (Clinton Presidential Center) (b. 1930)
  - Ray Rippelmeyer, 89, baseball player (Washington Senators) and coach (Philadelphia Phillies) (b. 1933)
  - Herschel Sizemore, 87, bluegrass mandolinist (b. 1935)
  - Robert Hitchcock Spain, 96, United Methodist bishop (b. 1925)
- September 10
  - Paulino Bernal, 83, accordion player and Christian evangelist (b. 1939)
  - Frank Cignetti Sr., 84, college football coach (IUP Crimson Hawks, West Virginia Mountaineers) (b. 1937)
  - Jorja Fleezanis, 70, violinist (b. 1952)
  - Eric Jones, 51, comic book artist (Little Gloomy) (b. 1971)
  - William Klein, 96, photographer, film director, and screenwriter (Who Are You, Polly Maggoo?, Mr. Freedom, The Model Couple) (b. 1926)
  - Maximilian Lerner, 98, Austrian-born intelligence soldier (Ritchie Boys) (b. 1924)
- September 11
  - David E. Grange Jr., 97, military officer (b. 1925)
  - Joe Hart, 78, politician, member of the Arizona House of Representatives (1992–2001) (b. 1944)
  - Sonia Handelman Meyer, 102, photographer (b. 1920)
  - John W. O'Malley, 95, academic, Catholic historian and Jesuit priest (b. 1927)
  - Page Pate, 55, attorney (b. 1967)
  - Roy Schmidt, 80, football player (New Orleans Saints, Atlanta Falcons, Washington Redskins, Minnesota Vikings) (b. 1942)
  - Anthony Varvaro, 37, baseball player (Seattle Mariners, Atlanta Braves, Boston Red Sox) (b. 1984)
  - Steven Zelditch, 68, mathematician (b. 1953)
- September 12
  - Harry Booth, 81, college basketball and baseball coach (Saint Joseph's Hawks) (b. 1941)
  - Jimmy Flynn, 88, teamster and actor (Good Will Hunting, The Cider House Rules) (b. 1934)
  - Ramsey Lewis, 87, jazz pianist ("The 'In' Crowd"), composer and radio personality (WNUA), Grammy winner (1966, 1967, 1974) (b. 1935)
  - Lowry Mays, 87, mass media executive, co-founder of Clear Channel Communications (b. 1935)
  - Eric Pianka, 83, herpetologist and evolutionary ecologist (b. 1939)
  - PnB Rock, 30, rapper ("Selfish") (b. 1991)
  - Henry Rupert Wilhoit Jr., 87, lawyer, judge of the U.S. District Court for the Eastern District of Kentucky (since 1981) (b. 1935)
- September 13
  - Fred Franzia, 79, winemaker (Bronco Wine Company) (b. 1943)
  - Roxanne Lowit, 80, fashion photographer (b. 1942)
  - Jesse Powell, 51, R&B singer ("All I Need", "I Wasn't with It", "You") (b. 1971)
  - Jim Russell, 76, journalist and radio producer (b. 1946)
  - Ken Starr, 76, lawyer (Whitewater controversy), judge of the U.S. Court of Appeals for the D.C. Circuit (1983–1989) and solicitor general (1989–1993) (b. 1946)
- September 14
  - Aram Bakshian, 78, political aide and speechwriter, White House director of speechwriting (1981–1983) (b. 1944)
  - Cal Browning, 84, baseball player (St. Louis Cardinals).
  - Kevin M. Cahill, 86, physician.
  - Robert P. Maginnis, 88, Roman Catholic prelate, auxiliary bishop of Philadelphia (1996–2010) (b. 1933)
  - Bill Pearl, 91, bodybuilder (b. 1930)
  - Jim Post, 82, singer (Friend & Lover) and songwriter ("Reach Out of the Darkness") (b. 1939)
  - Jeff Pyle, 58, politician, member of the Pennsylvania House of Representatives (2005–2021), kidney cancer (b. 1964)
  - Henry Silva, 95, actor (Ocean's 11, The Manchurian Candidate, Ghost Dog: The Way of the Samurai) (b. 1926)
- September 15
  - Brian Binnie, 69, commercial astronaut (SpaceShipOne flight 17P) (b. 1953)
  - Sam Howe, 84, squash player (b. 1938)
  - Saul Kripke, 81, philosopher and logician (b. 1940)
  - Earle Labor, 94, literary scholar (b. 1928)
  - John Stearns, 71, baseball player and coach (New York Mets) (b. 1951)
- September 16
  - Ronald Cohn, 78, zoologist (b. 1943)
  - Marva Hicks, 66, singer and actress (Mad About You, One Life to Live, Star Trek: Voyager) (b. 1956)
  - James Aubrey Parker, 85, lawyer, judge of the U.S. District Court for the District of New Mexico (since 1987) (b. 1937)
- September 17
  - Joseph P. Hoar, 87, Marine Corps general (b. 1934)
  - Phil Mulkey, 89, Olympic decathlete (1960) (b. 1933)
  - Art Noonan, 70, politician, member of the Montana House of Representatives (2004–2009) (b. 1951)
  - Maarten Schmidt, 92, Dutch-born astronomer (Kennicutt–Schmidt law), discoverer of the quasar (b. 1929)
- September 18
  - Nick Holonyak, 93, engineer and inventor (b. 1928)
  - Wally Tatomir, 76, Canadian-born ice hockey equipment manager (Carolina Hurricanes) and inventor (b. 1946)
  - Jeff Weiss, 82, actor (Vanilla Sky, Mr. Destiny) and playwright (b. 1940)
- September 19
  - Vernon Dvorak, 100, meteorologist (b. 1922)
  - Joseph Fiorenza, 91, Roman Catholic prelate, bishop of San Angelo (1979–1984) and Galveston-Houston (1985–2006) (b. 1931)
  - David Foreman, 74, environmentalist, founder of Earth First! (b. 1947)
  - Marilyn P. Johnson, 100, diplomat, ambassador to Togo (1978–1981) (b. 1922)
  - Herb Lusk, 69, football player (Philadelphia Eagles) and pastor (b. 1953)
  - Valerie Maynard, 85, sculptor (b. 1937)
  - Maury Wills, 89, baseball player (Los Angeles Dodgers, Pittsburgh Pirates) and manager (Seattle Mariners) (b. 1932)
- September 20
  - David C. Harrington, 68, politician, member of the Maryland Senate (2008–2011) and mayor of Bladensburg (1995–2002) (b. 1954)
  - Robert Kalfin, 89, stage director and producer (b. 1933)
- September 21
  - Dean Caswell, 100, World War II flying ace (b. 1922)
  - Ray Edenton, 95, guitarist and session musician (b. 1926)
  - Anton Fier, 66, drummer, composer and producer (The Feelies, The Golden Palominos, Bob Mould) (b. 1956) (death announced on this date)
  - Charles Kadushin, 90, psychologist (b. 1932)
  - Greg Lee, 70, basketball player (Portland Trail Blazers) (b. 1951)
  - Darrell Mudra, 93, Hall of Fame college football coach (North Dakota State University, University of Arizona, Eastern Illinois University) (b. 1929)
  - Allan M. Siegal, 82, newspaper editor (The New York Times) (b. 1940)
- September 22
  - Donald M. Blinken, 96, diplomat, ambassador to Hungary (1994–1997) (b. 1925)
  - Tim Hankinson, 67, soccer coach (b. 1955)
  - Wendell Lady, 91, politician, member (1969–1983) and speaker (1979–1983) of the Kansas House of Representatives (b. 1930)
  - Nick Mumley, 85, football player (New York Titans) (b. 1937)
- September 23
  - Zack Estrin, 51, television writer and producer (Prison Break, Charmed, Lost in Space) (b. 1970/1971)
  - Louise Fletcher, 88, actress (One Flew Over the Cuckoo's Nest, Star Trek: Deep Space Nine, Firestarter), Oscar winner (1976) (b. 1934)
  - Bill Fulcher, 88, football player (Washington Redskins) and coach (Georgia Tech Yellow Jackets, Tampa Spartans) (b. 1934)
- September 24
  - Rita Gardner, 87, stage actress (b. 1934)
  - Sue Mingus, 92, record producer and music manager (b. 1930)
  - Kitten Natividad, 74, Mexican-born actress (Beneath the Valley of the Ultra-Vixens, Night Patrol, Takin' It All Off) and exotic dancer (b. 1948)
  - Pharoah Sanders, 81, jazz saxophonist (b. 1940)
- September 25
  - James Florio, 85, politician, governor of New Jersey (1990–1994), member of the U.S. House of Representatives (1975–1990) (b. 1937)
  - Melvin Kaplan, 93, oboist (b. 1929)
  - Meredith Tax, 80, writer and political activist (b. 1942)
- September 26
  - Joe Bussard, 86, record collector (b. 1936)
  - Hilaree Nelson, 49, ski mountaineer (b. 1972)
  - William Rivers Pitt, 50, author (b. 1971)
  - Tom Reed, 77, college football player and coach (Miami Hurricanes, North Carolina State Wolfpack) (b. 1945)
  - Mark Souder, 72, politician, member of the U.S. House of Representatives (1995–2010) (b. 1950)
  - Venetia Stevenson, 84, English-born actress (Day of the Outlaw, Seven Ways from Sundown, The Sergeant Was a Lady) (b. 1938)
- September 27
  - Arlene Bashnett, 103, internet celebrity (Gramma and Ginga) (b. 1919)
  - Michael John Sheridan, 77, Roman Catholic prelate, auxiliary bishop of St. Louis (1997–2001), coadjutor bishop (2001–2003) and bishop (2003–2021) of Colorado Springs (b. 1945)
- September 28
  - Coolio, 59, rapper ("Gangsta's Paradise", "Fantasic Voyage", "1, 2, 3, 4 (Sumpin' New)") and actor, Grammy winner (1996) (b. 1963)
  - Gavin Escobar, 31, football player (Dallas Cowboys) (b. 1991)
  - Bill Plante, 84, journalist (CBS News) (b. 1938)
  - Tom Urbani, 54, baseball player (St. Louis Cardinals, Detroit Tigers) (b. 1968)
- September 29
  - C. B. Embry, 81, politician, member of the Kentucky House of Representatives (2003) and Senate (2003–2022) (b. 1941)
  - Audrey Evans, 97, British-born oncologist and philanthropist, co-founder of Ronald McDonald House Charities (b. 1925)
  - David Malachowski, 67, guitarist, producer and composer (b. 1955)
  - Marybeth Peters, 83, attorney, register of copyrights (1994–2010) (b. 1939)
  - Al Primo, 87, television news executive (b. 1935)
- September 30
  - Max Baer, 74, jurist, chief justice of the Supreme Court of Pennsylvania (since 2021) (b. 1947)
  - Bill Basford, 92, politician, member of the Florida House of Representatives (1963–1966) (b. 1930)
  - Keith "Wonderboy" Johnson, 50, gospel singer (b. 1972)
  - Kevin Locke, 68, flautist and hoop dancer (b. 1954)
  - Roger Welsch, 85, television correspondent and author (b. 1936)
  - Dan Wieden, 77, advertising executive, co-founder of Wieden+Kennedy (b. 1945)

== October ==
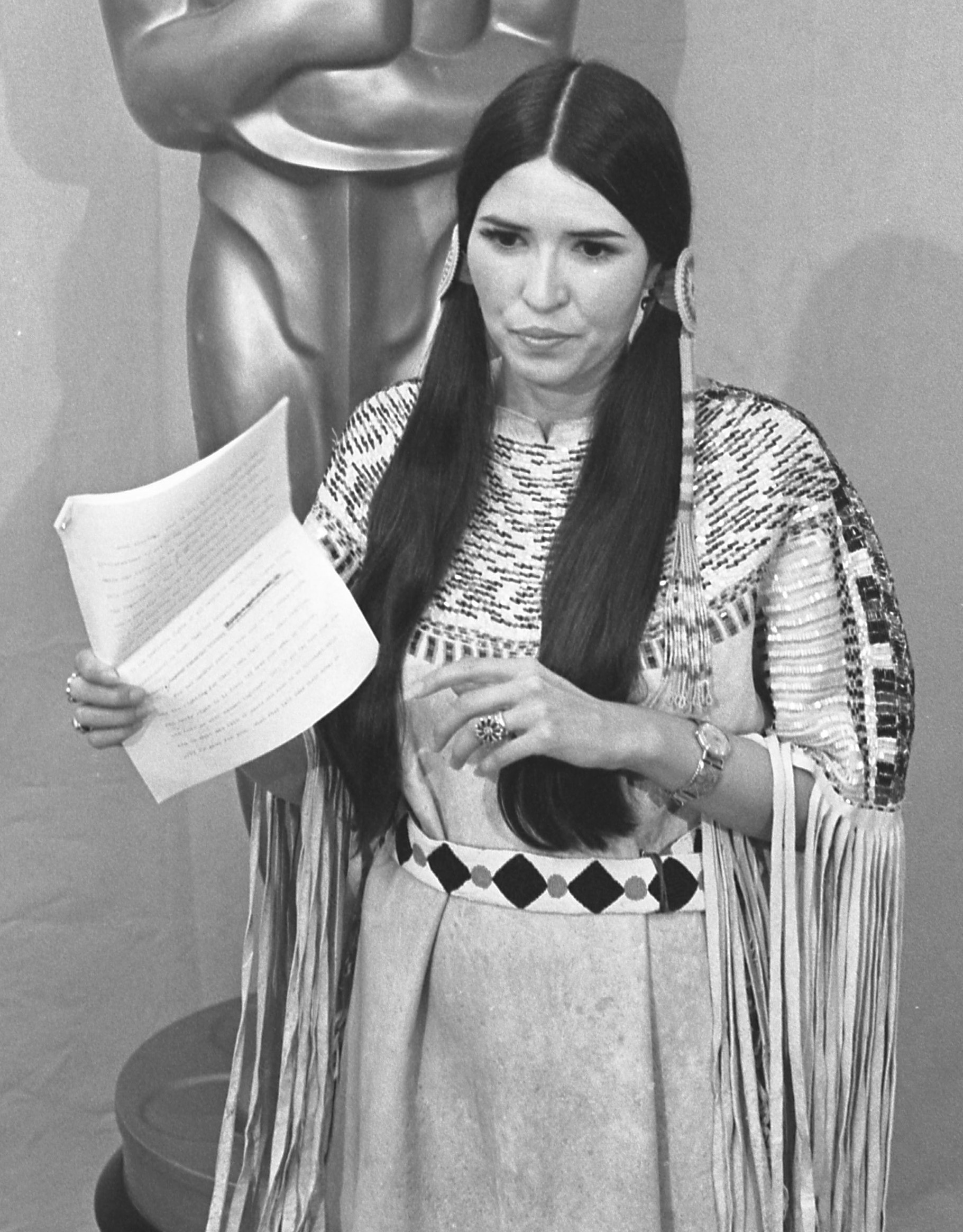
Sacheen Littlefeather

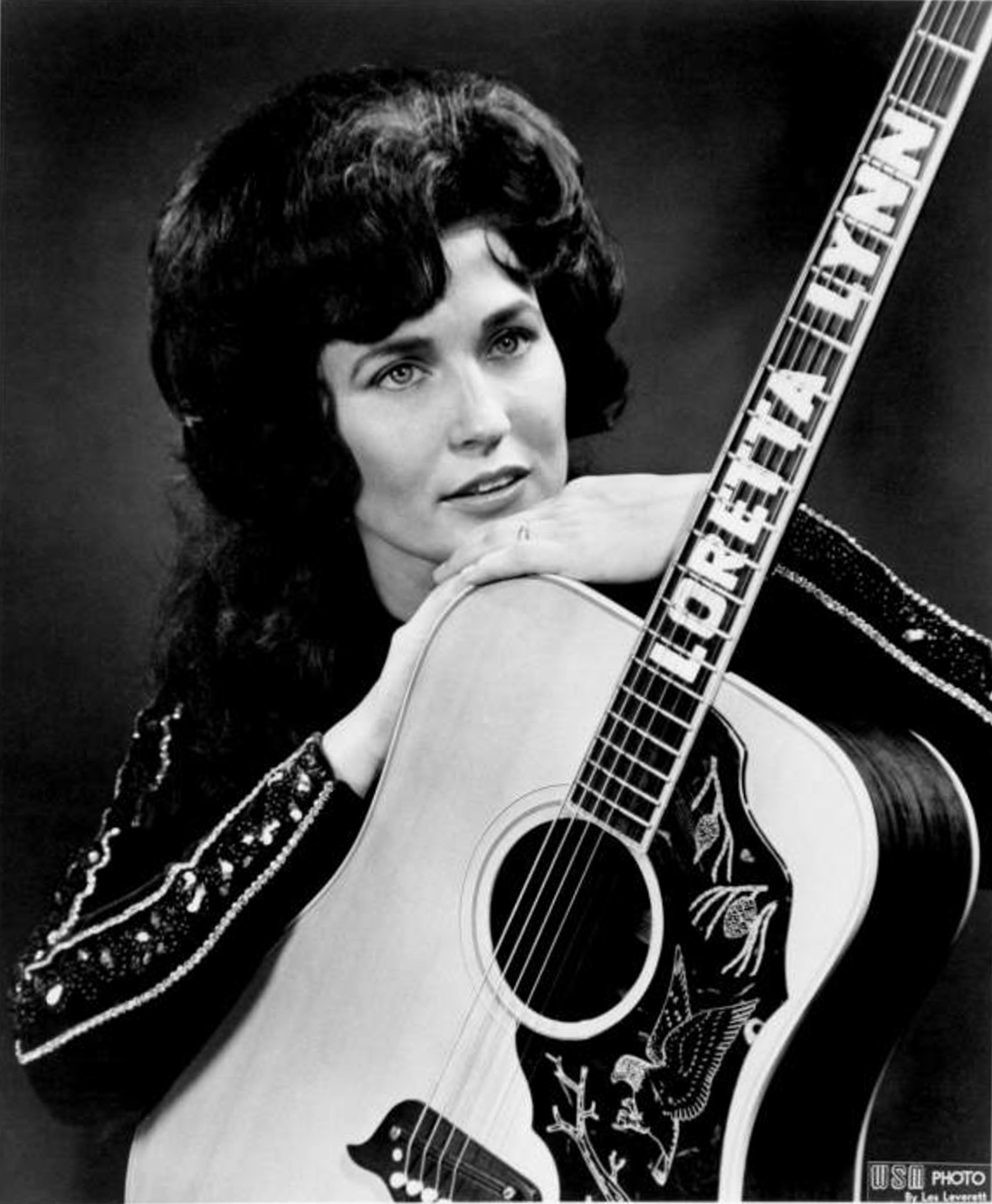
Loretta Lynn

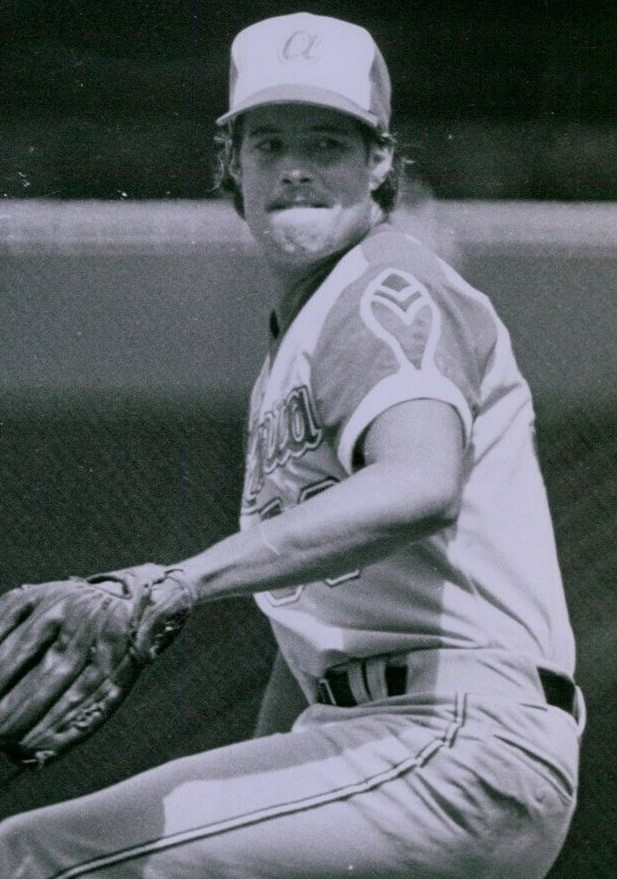
Tommy Boggs

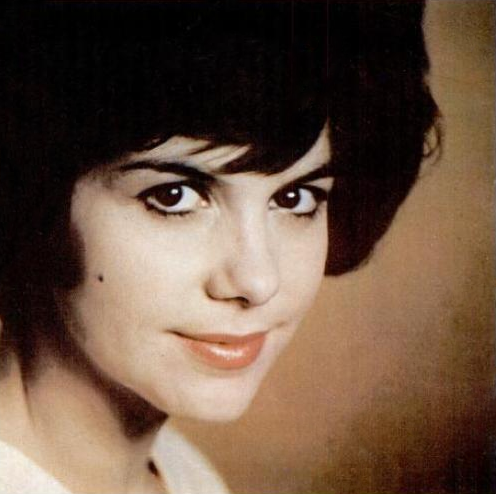
Jody Miller

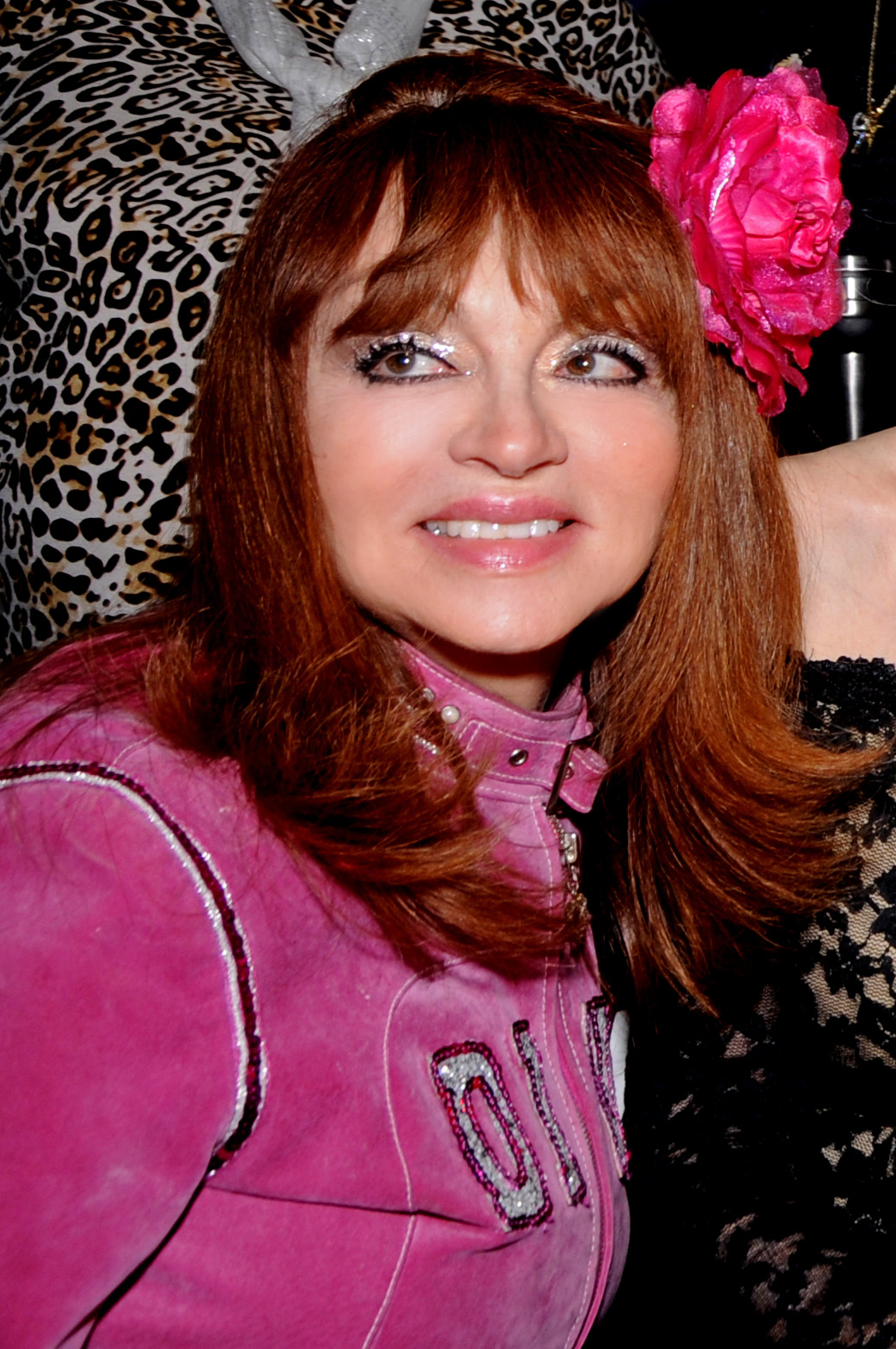
Judy Tenuta

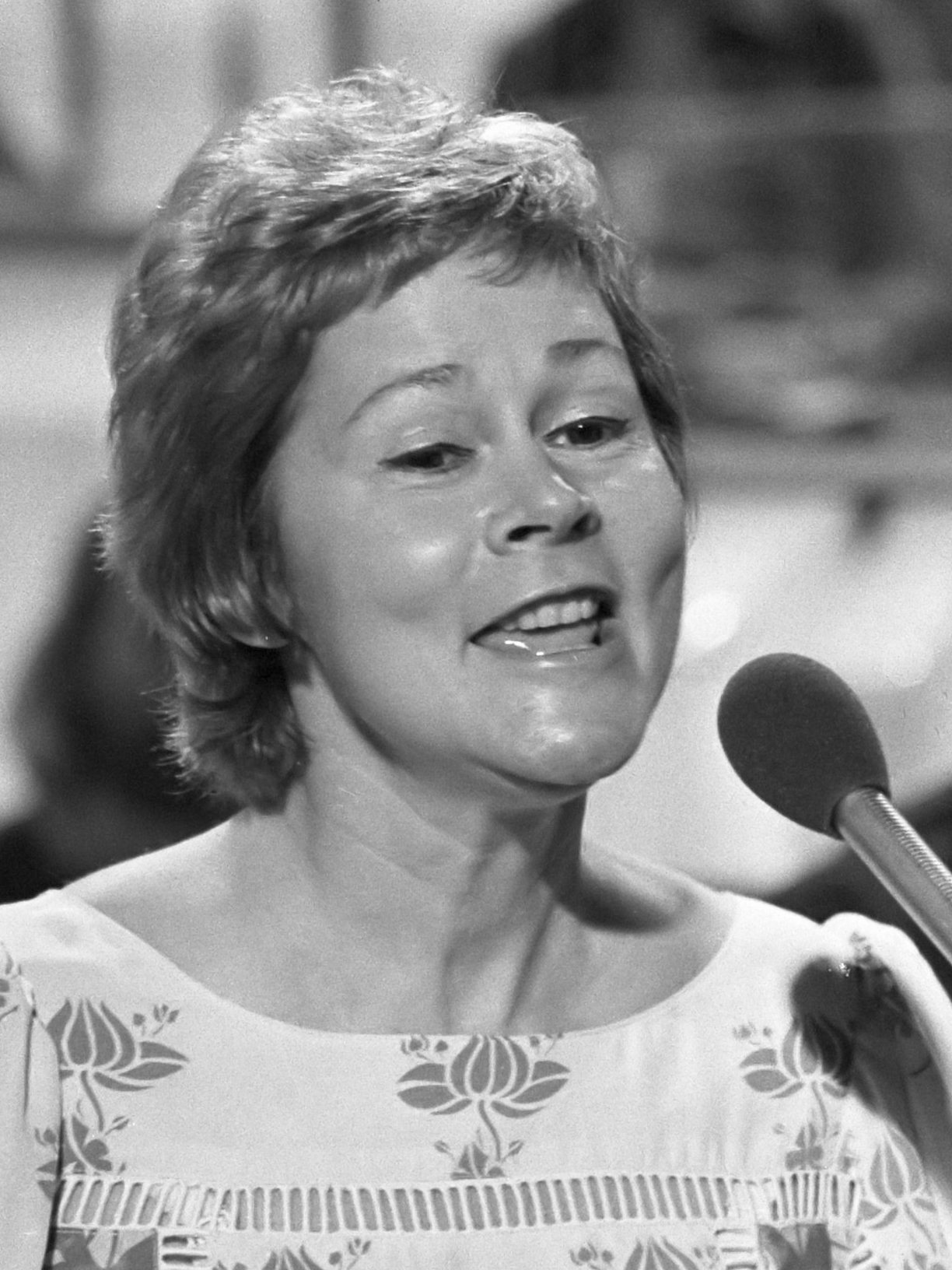
Anita Kerr

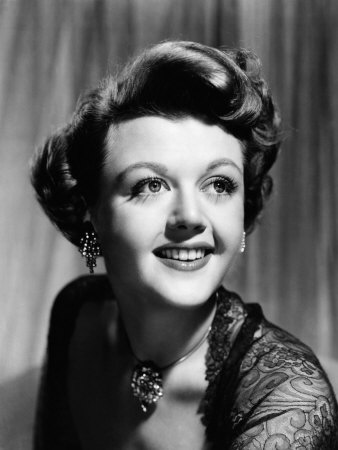
Angela Lansbury

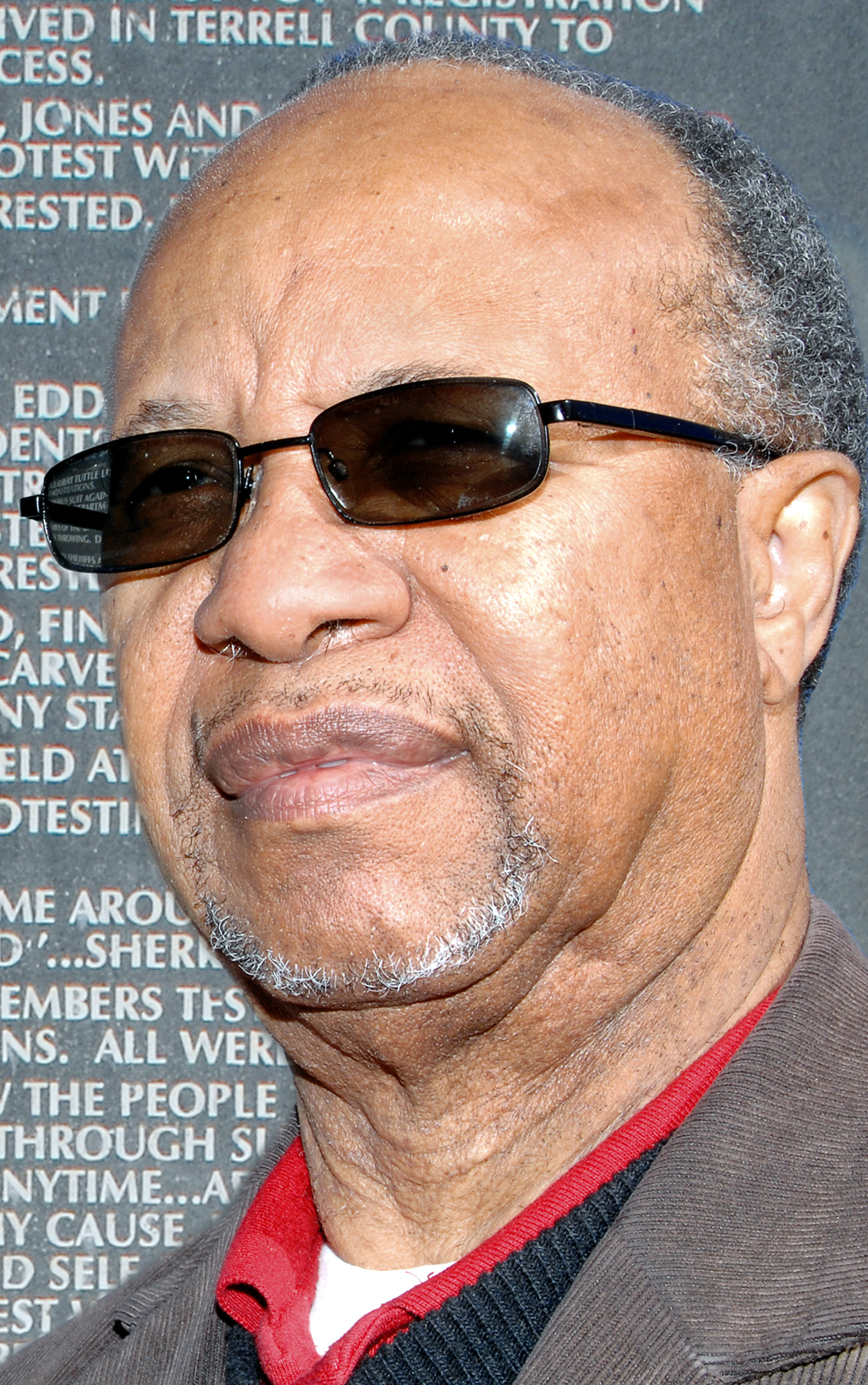
Charles Sherrod

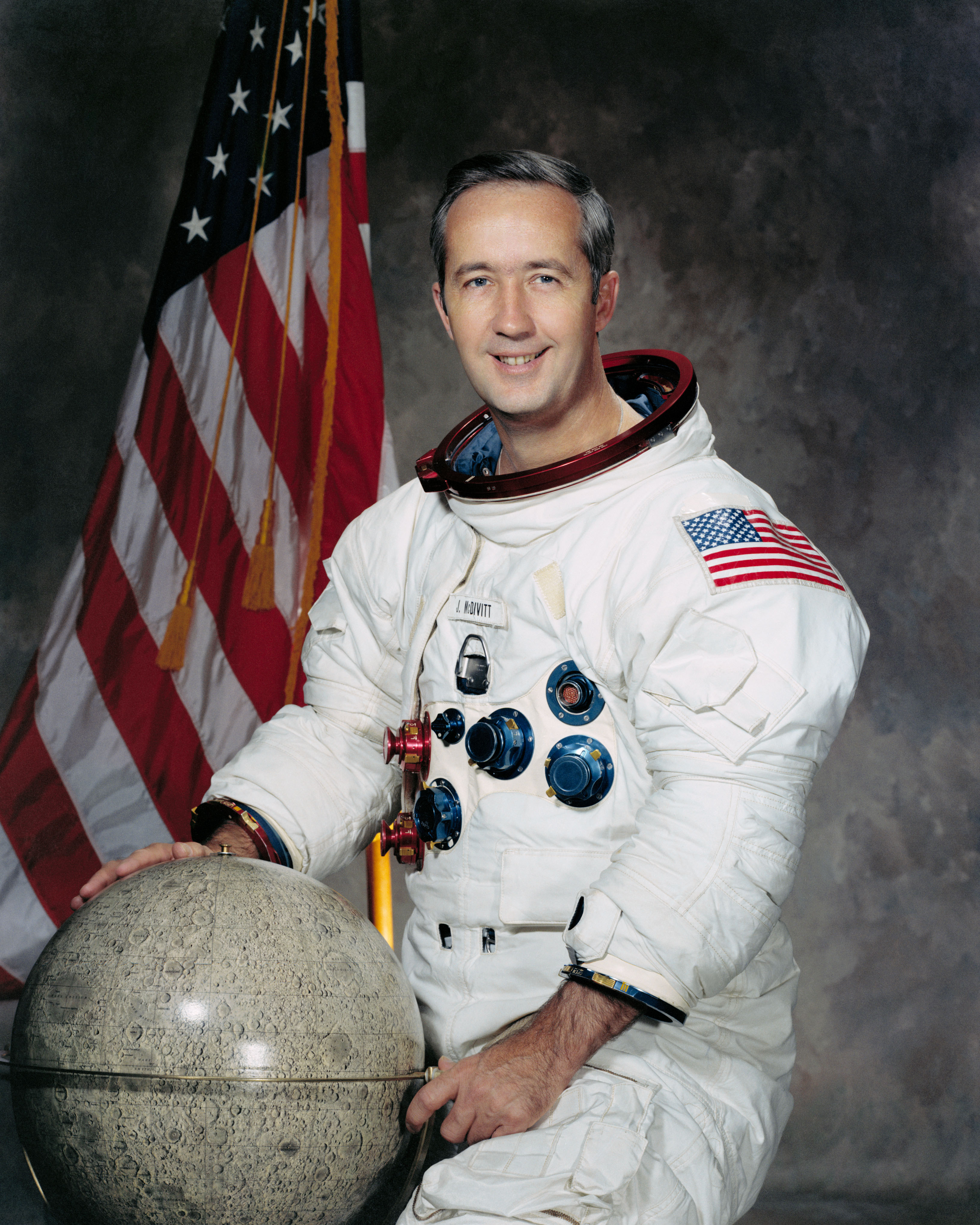
James McDivitt

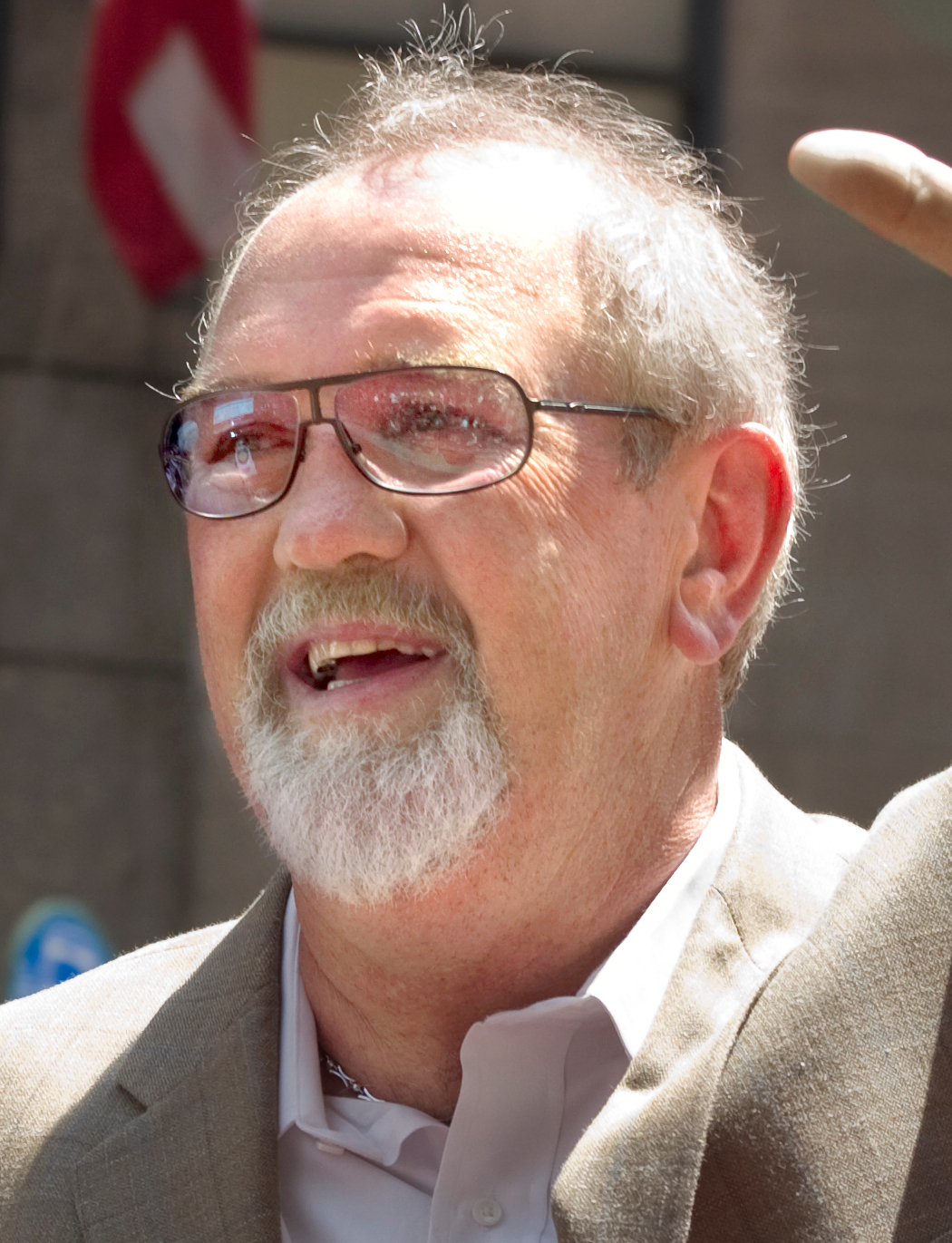
Bruce Sutter

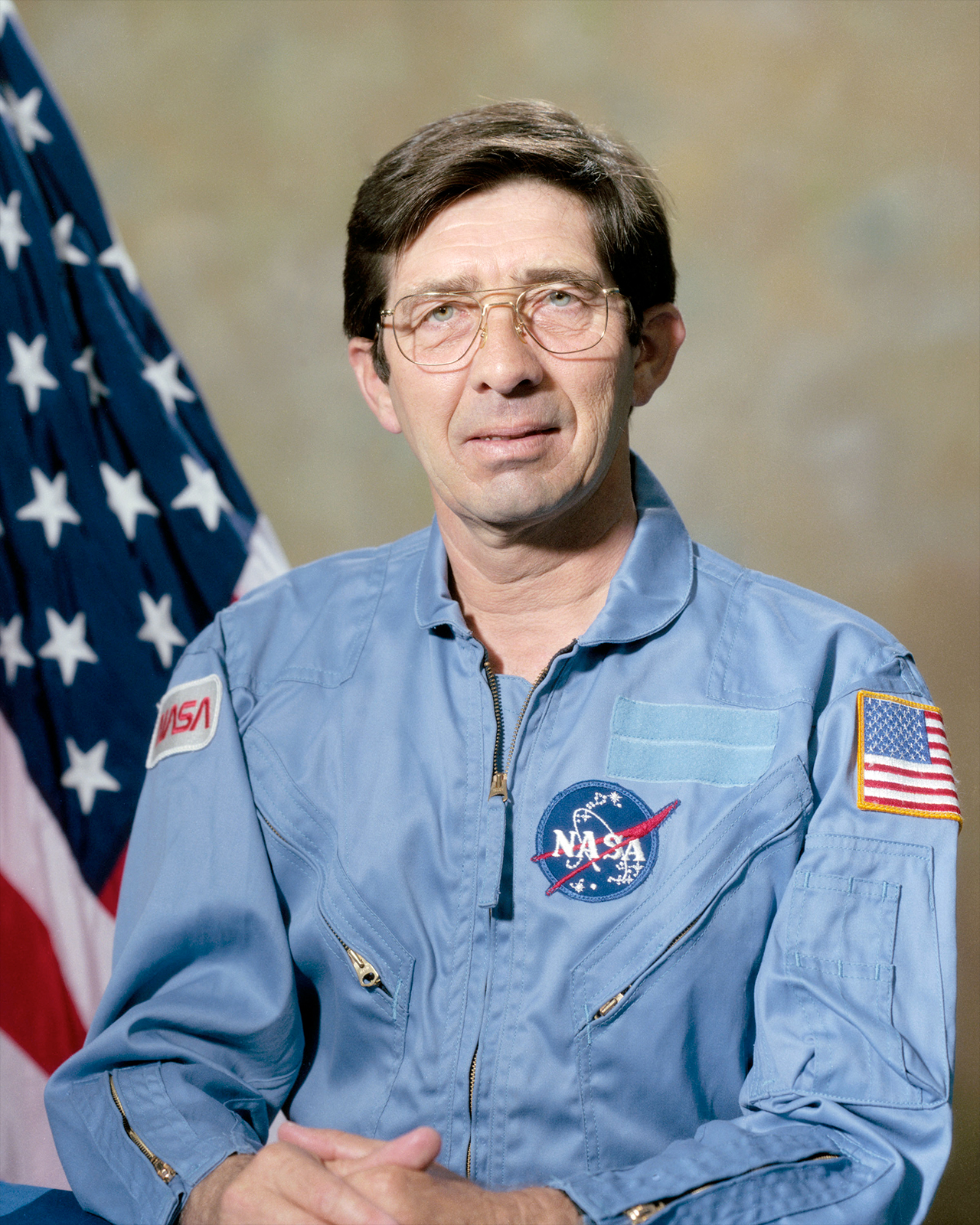
Lodewijk van den Berg

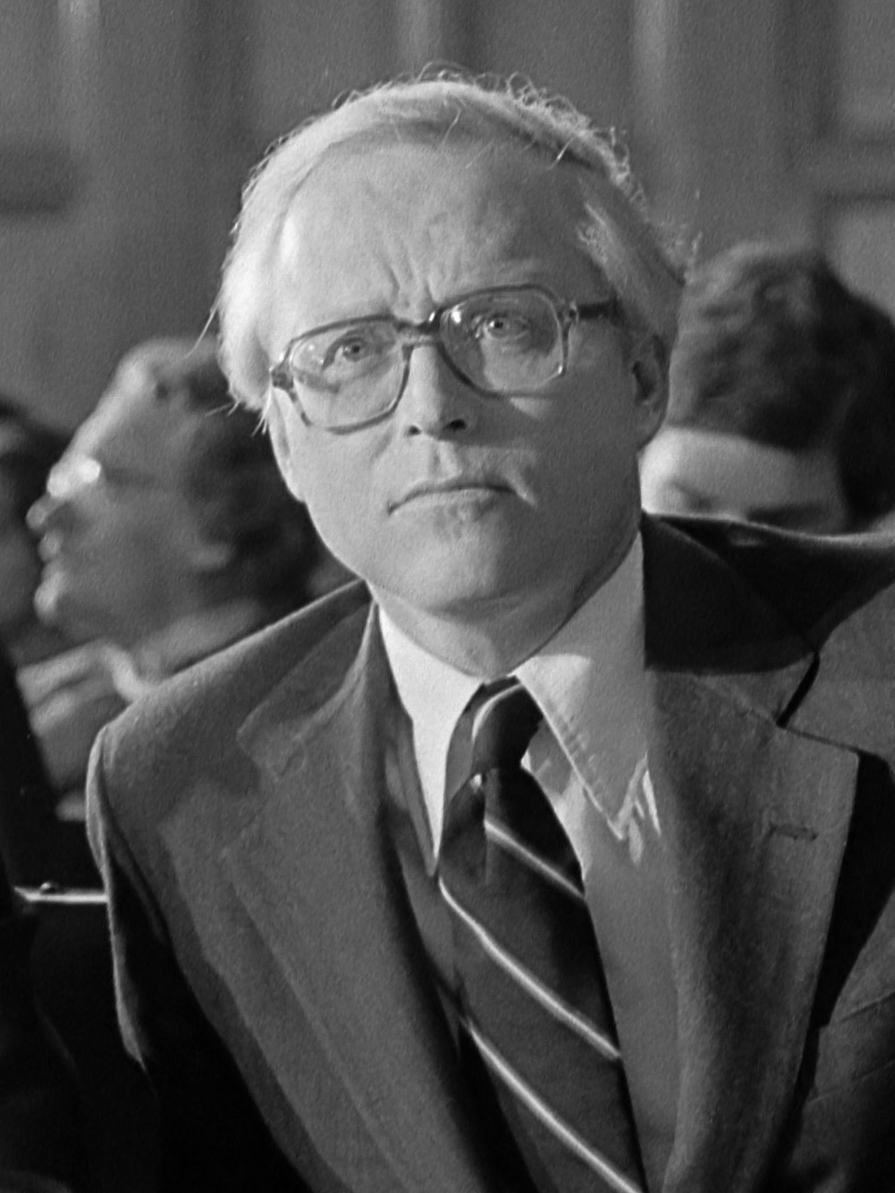
Benjamin Civiletti

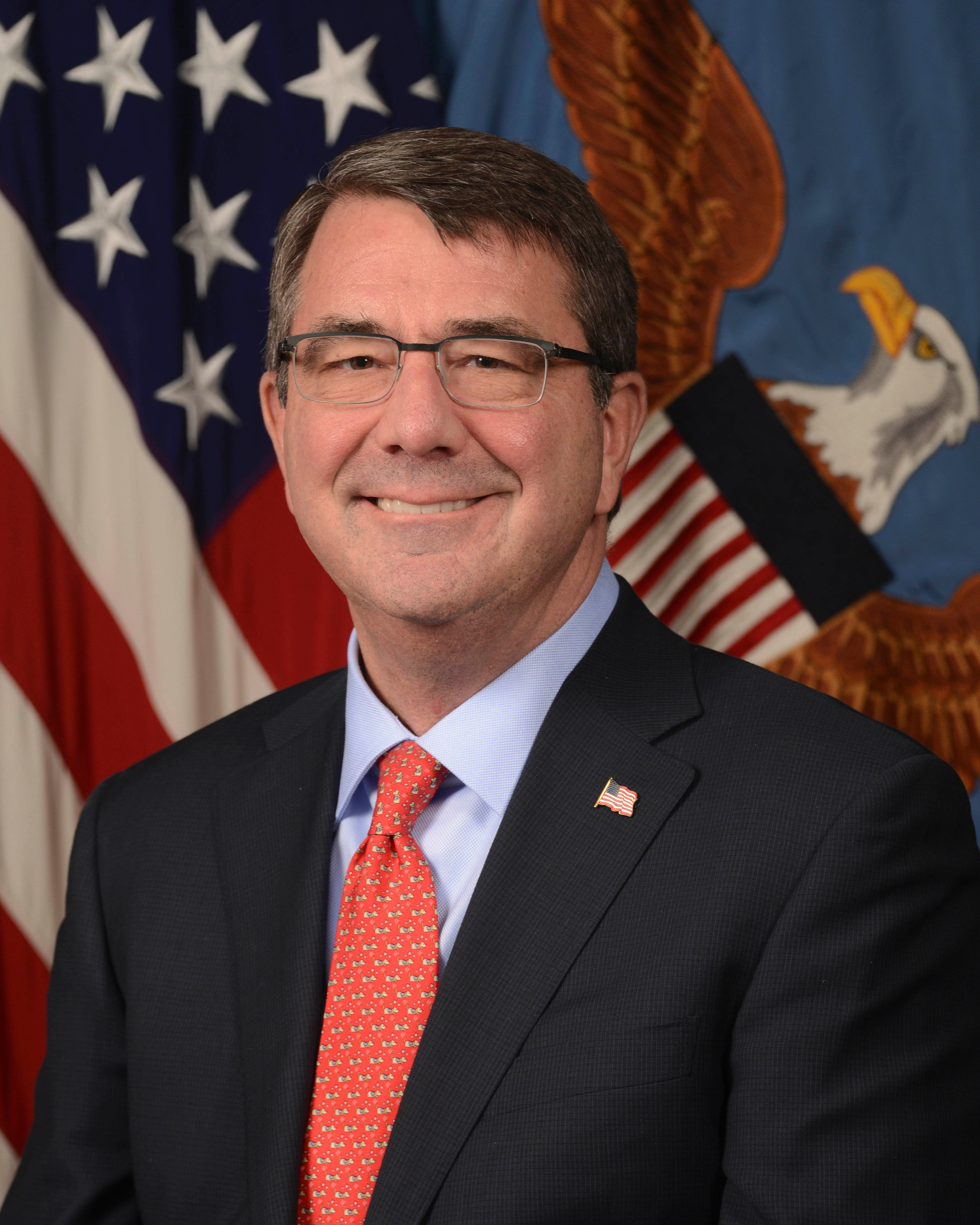
Ash Carter

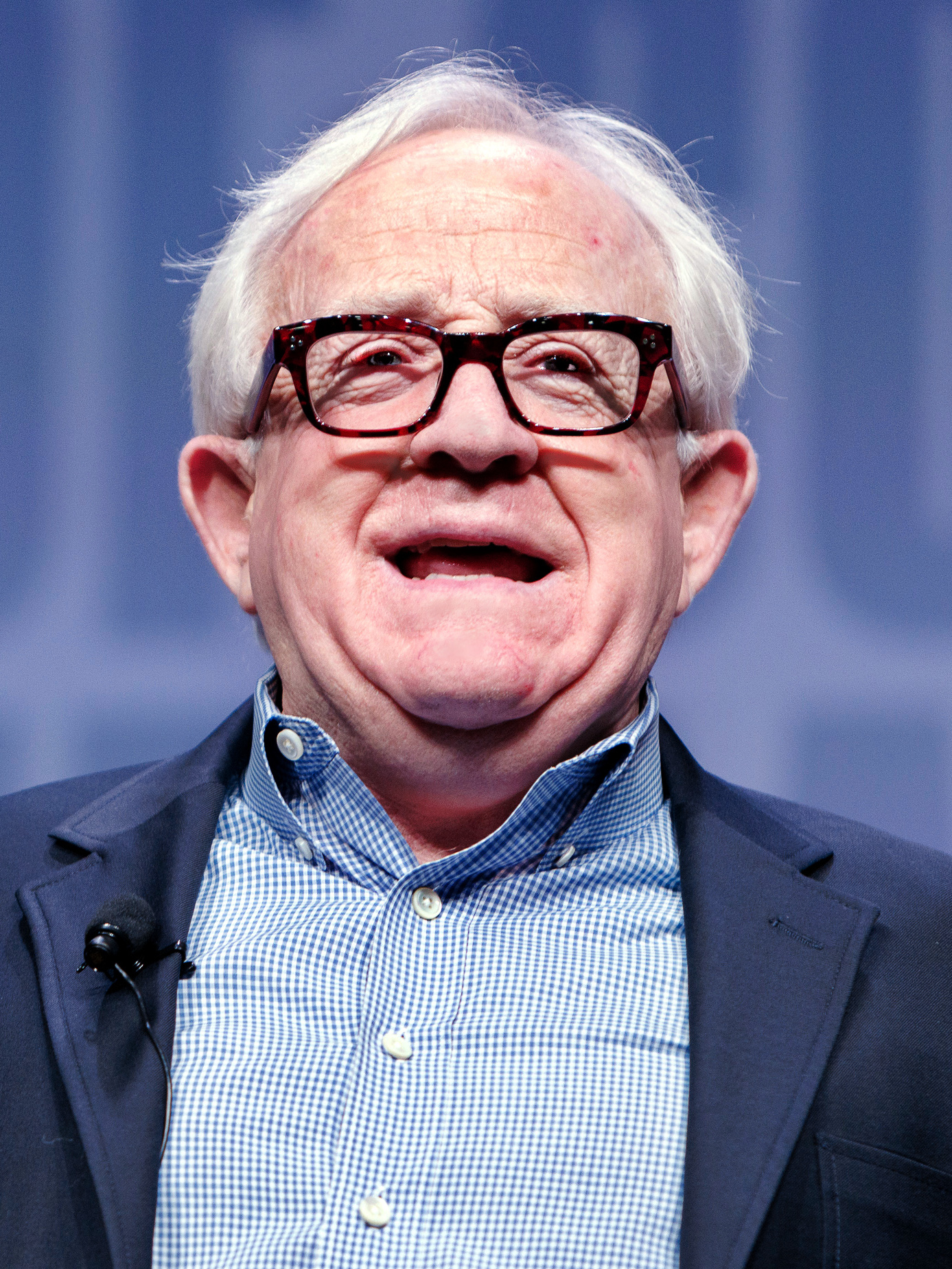
Leslie Jordan

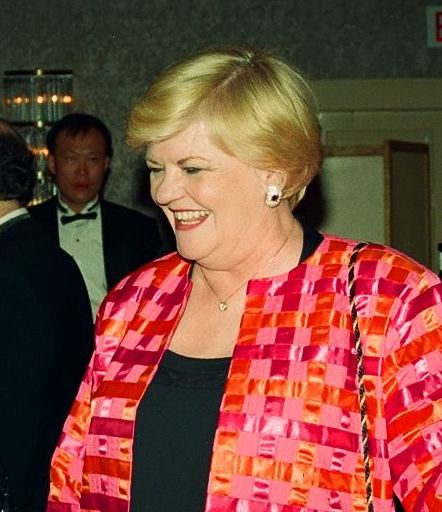
Lucianne Goldberg

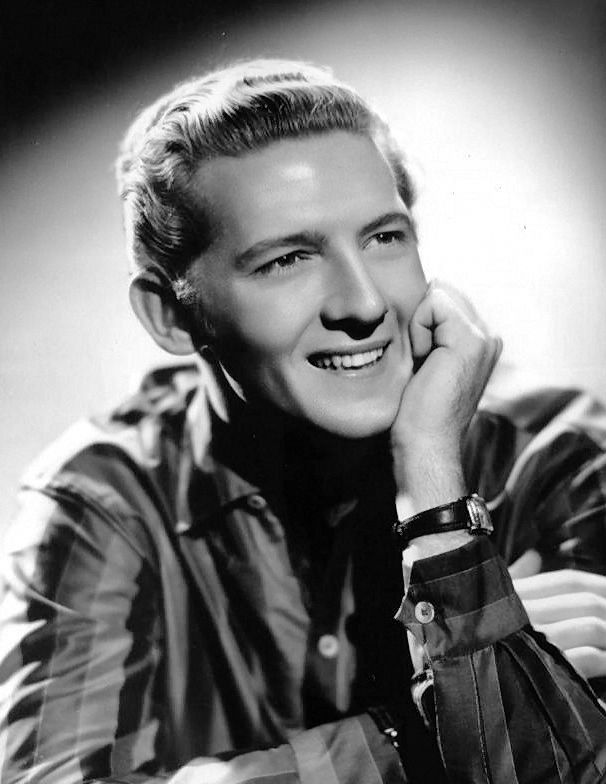
Jerry Lee Lewis

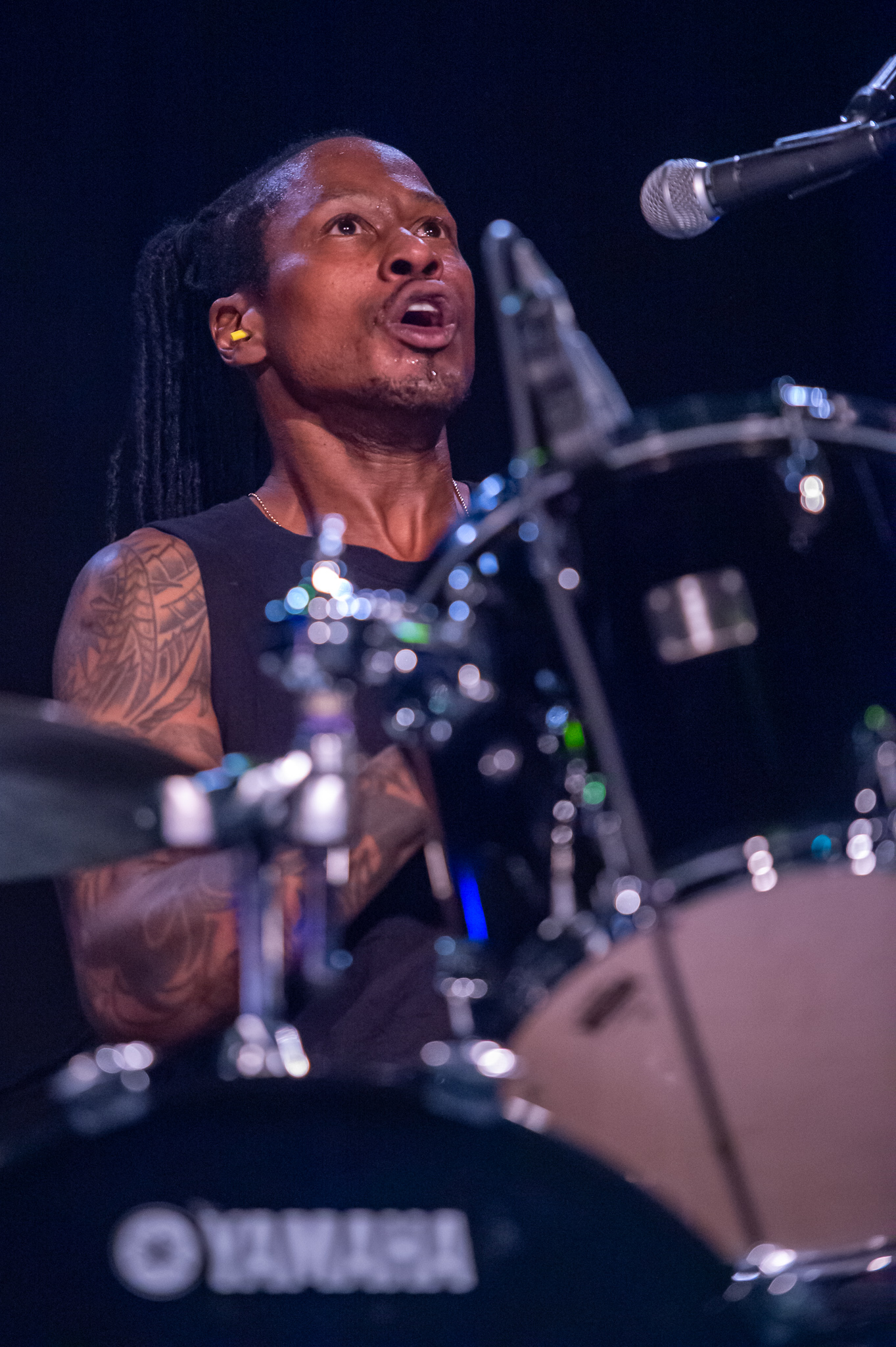
D. H. Peligro

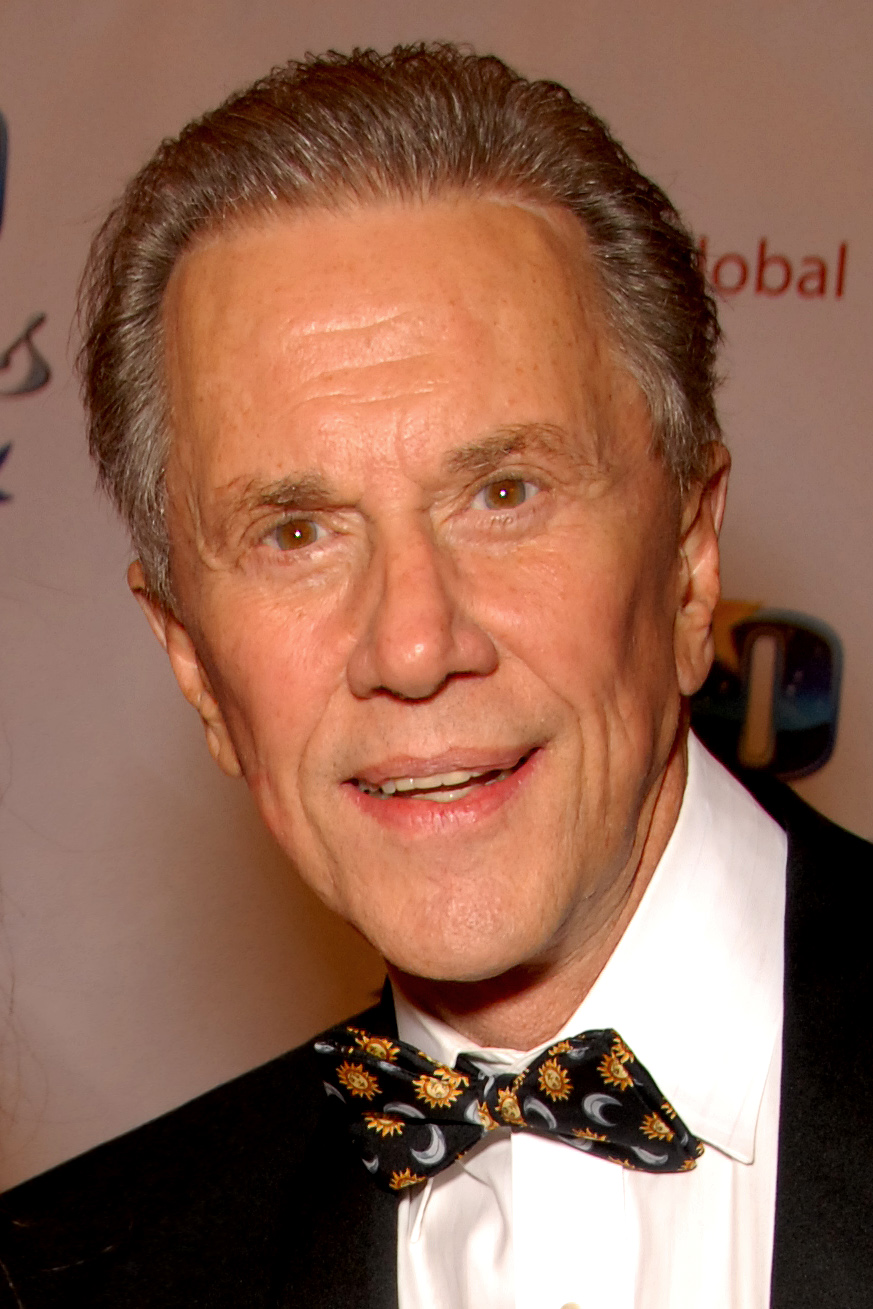
Andrew Prine

- October 1
  - Colin Alevras, 51, restaurateur (b. 1971)
  - Beryl Benacerraf, 73, radiologist (b. 1949)
  - William G. Borchert, 89, screenwriter (My Name Is Bill W.) (b. 1933)
  - Lorry I. Lokey, 95, businessman and philanthropist, founder of Business Wire (b. 1927)
  - Raymond Strother, 81, political consultant (b. 1940)
  - Jim Sweeney, 60, football player (New York Jets, Pittsburgh Steelers, Seattle Seahawks) (b. 1962)
- October 2
  - Tyrone Davis, 50, football player (Green Bay Packers, New York Jets) (b. 1972)
  - Shirley Englehorn, 81, professional golfer (LPGA) (b. 1940)
  - Douglas Kirkland, 88, Canadian-born photographer
  - Jeff Jordan, 78, football player (Minnesota Vikings) (b. 1943)
  - Sacheen Littlefeather, 75, activist on behalf of Native American civil rights, actress (Counselor at Crime, Johnny Firecloud, Winterhawk), and model (b. 1946)
  - Mary McCaslin, 75, folk singer-songwriter (b. 1946)
  - Allan Porter, 88, American-born Swiss photographer and magazine editor (Camera) (b. 1934)
  - Larry Sather, 81, politician, member of the Pennsylvania House of Representatives (1993–2006) (b. 1940)
  - John Shinners, 75, football player (Cincinnati Bengals, New Orleans Saints, Baltimore Colts) (b. 1947)
  - Laurence Silberman, 86, jurist, judge of the U.S. Court of Appeals for the District of Columbia (since 1985) (b. 1935)
  - Bill Whitaker, 62, football player (Green Bay Packers, St. Louis Cardinals) (b. 1952)
- October 3
  - William K. Brewster, 80, politician, member of the U.S. House of Representatives (1991–1997) and Oklahoma House of Representatives (1983–1990) (b. 1941)
  - Nancy B. Firestone, 70, jurist, judge of the U.S. Court of Federal Claims (since 1998) (b. 1951)
  - Ron Franz, 76, basketball player (Oakland Oaks, New Orleans Buccaneers, Floridians) (b. 1945)
  - Charles Fuller, 83, playwright (A Soldier's Play, Zooman and the Sign), Pulitzer winner (1982) (b. 1939)
  - Tiffany Jackson, 37, basketball player (New York Liberty, Tulsa Shock, Los Angeles Sparks) and coach (b. 1985)
  - Al Neiger, 83, baseball player (Philadelphia Phillies) (b. 1939)
- October 4
  - Walter Dean Burnham, 92, political scientist and author (Presidential Ballots, 1836–1892) (b. 1930)
  - Loretta Lynn, 90, country singer ("Coal Miner's Daughter", "You Ain't Woman Enough (To Take My Man)", "One's on the Way") (b. 1932)
  - Eleanor Moore, 88, baseball player (Fort Wayne Daisies, Grand Rapids Chicks) (b. 1933)
  - Janet Thurlow, 96, jazz singer (b. 1926)
  - Jerry Vainisi, 80, football executive (Chicago Bears), (Detroit Lions) (b. 1941)
- October 5
  - Tommy Boggs, 66, baseball player (Atlanta Braves, Texas Rangers), and coach Concordia University Texas (b. 1955)
  - Sara Lee, 30, professional wrestler (WWE) and television personality (WWE Tough Enough) (b. 1992)
  - Lenny Lipton, 82, poet and lyricist ("Puff, the Magic Dragon") (b. 1940)
  - Bernard McGuirk, 64, radio personality (b. 1957)
  - John Henry Ramirez, 38, convicted murderer (b. 1984)
- October 6
  - Fred Catero, 89, record producer and engineer (b. 1933)
  - Ivy Jo Hunter, 82, songwriter ("Behind a Painted Smile", "Loving You Is Sweeter Than Ever", "Dancing in the Street") (b. 1940)
  - Jody Miller, 80, country singer, Grammy winner (1966) (b. 1941)
  - Gordon Mydland, 100, politician, attorney general of South Dakota (1969–1973) and member of South Dakota Senate (1963–1968) (b. 1922)
  - Roy Radner, 95, economist (b. 1927)
  - Kenneth M. Sayre, 94, philosopher (b. 1928)
  - Judy Tenuta, 72, comedian, actress (The Weird Al Show, Going Down in LA-LA Land, Love Bites), and musician (b. 1956)
- October 7
  - Warren J. Baker, 84, academic administrator, president of Cal Poly San Luis Obispo (1979–2010) (b. 1938)
  - Leon Burton, 87, football player (Arizona State Sun Devils, New York Titans) (b. 1935)
  - Ronnie Cuber, 80, jazz saxophonist (b. 1941)
  - Ada Fisher, 74, physician (b. 1947)
  - Ann Flood, 87, actress (The Edge of Night, From These Roots, Mystic Pizza) (b. 1934)
  - Art Laboe, 97, disc jockey (KXLA, KPOP), founder of Original Sound Records, pneumonia (b. 1925)
  - Bill Nieder, 89, shot putter, Olympic champion (1960) (b. 1933)
  - Robert Pennywell, 67, football player (Atlanta Falcons, Michigan Panthers) (b. 1954)
  - Al Ries, 95, marketing professional and author (b. 1926)
  - Austin Stoker, 92, Trinidadian-born actor (Assault on Precinct 13, Battle for the Planet of the Apes, Abby) (b. 1930)
  - Robert I. Toll, 81, homebuilder, co-founder of Toll Brothers (b. 1940)
  - Zita Leeson Weinshienk, 89, jurist, judge of the U.S. District Court of Colorado (1979–2011) (b. 1933)
- October 8
  - Billy Al Bengston, 88, visual artist and sculptor (b. 1934)
  - Chuck Bradley, 71, football player (San Diego Chargers, Miami Dolphins, Chicago Bears) (b. 1950)
  - Charlie Brown, 80, DJ (WKIX) and radio presenter (b. 1942)
  - Ron Gassert, 82, football player (Green Bay Packers) (b. 1940)
  - Grace Glueck, 96, arts journalist (The New York Times, The New Criterion, Los Angeles Review of Books) (b. 1926)
  - Julian Hammond, 79, basketball player (Denver Rockets) (b. 1943)
  - Frank Youso, 86, football player (New York Giants, Minnesota Vikings, Oakland Raiders) (b. 1936)
- October 9
  - Chuck Deardorf, 68, jazz musician (b. 1954)
  - Anthony M. DeLuca, 85, politician, member of the Pennsylvania House of Representatives (since 1983) (b. 1937)
  - Nikki Finke, 68, blogger and entertainment journalist (Deadline Hollywood) (b. 1953)
  - Doug Langway, 52, screenwriter and film director (BearCity) (b. 1970)
  - Eileen Ryan, 94, actress (Magnolia, Parenthood, Benny & Joon) (b. 1927)
  - Susan Tolsky, 79, actress (Madame's Place, Here Come the Brides, Darkwing Duck) (b. 1943)
- October 10
  - Michael Callan, 86, actor (Occasional Wife, Cat Ballou, Gidget Goes Hawaiian) (b. 1935)
  - Dick Ellsworth, 82, baseball player (Chicago Cubs, Boston Red Sox, Cleveland Indians) (b. 1940)
  - Sterling Johnson Jr., 88, jurist, judge of the U.S. District Court of Eastern New York (since 1991) (b. 1934)
  - Anita Kerr, 94, singer, Grammy winner (1966, 1967) (b. 1927)
  - Fred Martin, 95, artist (b. 1927)
  - Jim Niekamp, 76, ice hockey player (Detroit Red Wings) (b. 1946)
  - Roman Pelts, 85, Ukrainian-born chess master (b. 1937)
  - Joe Roberts, 86, basketball player (Ohio State Buckeyes, Syracuse Nationals, Kentucky Colonels) and coach (b. 1936)
  - James Wright, 83, historian, president of Dartmouth College (1998–2009) (b. 1939)
- October 11
  - Rick Cessar, 93, politician, member of the Pennsylvania House of Representatives (1971–1994) (b. 1928)
  - Herbert Chabot, 91, jurist, judge of the United States Tax Court (1978–2016) (b. 1931)
  - Harold Garde, 99, abstract expressionist painter (b. 1923)
  - Dame Angela Lansbury, 96, English-born actress (The Manchurian Candidate, Bedknobs and Broomsticks, Murder, She Wrote), five-time Tony winner (b. 1925)
  - Charles Sherrod, 85, civil rights activist (b. 1937)
  - Willie Spence, 23, singer (American Idol) (b. 1999)
- October 12
  - Jim Bailey, 87, baseball player (Cincinnati Reds) (b. 1934)
  - Lucious Jackson, 80, basketball player (Philadelphia 76ers, national team), Olympic champion (1964) (b. 1941)
  - Gary A. Lee, 89, politician, member of the U.S. House of Representatives (1979–1983) and New York State Assembly (1975–1979) (b. 1933)
  - Cyrus Mann, 66, basketball player (Crispa Redmanizers) (b. 1956)
  - Mary Adelia McLeod, 84, Episcopal bishop (b. 1938)
  - Monsta O, 56, rapper (Boo-Yaa T.R.I.B.E.) (b. 1966)
  - Ralph Pearson, 103, chemist (b. 1919)
  - Dolores Sloviter, 90, jurist, judge of the U.S. Court of Appeals for the Third Circuit (since 1979) (b. 1932)
- October 13
  - Jon Brittenum, 78, football player (Arkansas Razorbacks, San Diego Chargers) (b. 1944)
  - James McDivitt, 93, astronaut (Gemini 4, Apollo 9) (b. 1929)
  - Kenneth M. Sayre, 94, philosopher (b. 1928)
  - Moe Savransky, 93, baseball player (Cincinnati Redlegs) (b. 1929)
  - Mike Schank, 56, musician and actor (American Movie, Storytelling, Hamlet A.D.D.) (b. 1966)
  - Rollie Seltz, 98, basketball player (Anderson Packers, Waterloo Hawks, Saint Paul Lights) (b. 1924)
  - Ben Stevens, 63, politician, member (2001–2007) and president (2005–2007) of the Alaska Senate (b. 1959)
  - Bruce Sutter, 69, Hall of Fame baseball player (Chicago Cubs, St. Louis Cardinals, Atlanta Braves) (b. 1953)
- October 14
  - George Johanson, 94, painter, printmaker, and ceramic tile artist (b. 1928)
  - N. U. Prabhu, 98, Indian-born mathematician (b. 1924)
  - Jan Rabson, 68, voice actor (Akira, Leisure Suit Larry, James Bond Jr.) (b. 1954)
  - Ted White, 96, stuntman (Escape from New York, Road House) and actor (Friday the 13th: The Final Chapter) (b. 1926)
- October 15
  - Ken Kortas, 80, football player (Pittsburgh Steelers) (b. 1942)
  - Sylvia Laughter, 63, politician, member of the Arizona House of Representatives (1999–2005) (b. 1959)
  - Jay Owen Light, 81, academic administrator (b. 1941)
  - Marty Sammon, 45, blues pianist (Buddy Guy) (b. 1977)
  - Joyce Sims, 63, R&B singer-songwriter ("Come Into My Life") (b. 1959)
  - Thomas Sleeper, 66, composer and conductor (b. 1956)
- October 16
  - Lodewijk van den Berg, 90, Dutch-born chemical engineer and astronaut (b. 1932)
  - Benjamin Civiletti, 87, lawyer, U.S. Attorney General (1979–1981) (b. 1935)
  - Cyrus Mann, 66, basketball player (Crispa Redmanizers) (b. 1956)
- October 18
  - Thomas Cahill, 82, scholar and writer (How the Irish Saved Civilization) (b. 1940)
  - Charles Duncan Jr., 96, businessman and politician, secretary of energy (1979–1981) and president of the Coca-Cola Company (1972–1974) (b. 1926)
  - Pablo Eisenberg, 90, scholar, social justice advocate, and tennis player (b. 1932)
  - Robert Gordon, 75, rockabilly singer (b. 1947)
  - Tom Maddox, 77, science fiction writer (b. 1945)
  - John P. Meier, 80, biblical scholar and Roman Catholic priest (b. 1942)
  - Charlie Smithgall, 77, politician, mayor of Lancaster, Pennsylvania (1998–2006) (b 1945)
  - Gus Stavros, 97, businessman and philanthropist (b. 1925)
  - Earl Strinden, 90, politician, member of the North Dakota House of Representatives (1967–1989) (b. 1931)
  - Harvey Wollman, 87, politician, governor (1978–1979) and lieutenant governor (1975–1978) of South Dakota, member of the South Dakota Senate (1968–1970) (b. 1935)
- October 19
  - Louis Gigante, 90, Roman Catholic priest (b. 1932)
  - Dave Herman, 81, football player (New York Jets) (b. 1941)
  - John Jay Osborn Jr., 77, author (The Paper Chase) (b. 1945)
  - Joanna Simon, 85, opera singer (b. 1936)
  - Charley Trippi, 100, Hall of Fame football player (Chicago Cardinals) (b. 1921)
- October 20
  - Bettye Crutcher, 83, songwriter ("Who's Making Love") (b. 1939)
  - Tom Emberton, 90, politician and jurist, judge of the Kentucky Court of Appeals (1987–2004) (b. 1932)
  - Ron Masak, 86, actor (Murder, She Wrote, Tora! Tora! Tora!, Evel Knievel) (b. 1936)
  - Lucy Simon, 82, composer and folk singer (The Simon Sisters) (b. 1940)
  - Al Sutton, 88, anti-racism activist, jazz pianist and actor (b. 1933)
- October 21
  - Jim Bolla, 70, college basketball coach (UNLV Lady Rebels, Hawaii Rainbow Wahine) (b. 1952)
  - Robert Gordy, 91, music publishing executive (b. 1931)
  - Tom Hoover, 81, drag racer (b. 1941)
  - Peter Schjeldahl, 80, art critic (The New Yorker, The New York Times, ARTnews) and poet (b. 1942)
  - Charles F. Stevens, 88, neuroscientist (b. 1934)
- October 22
  - Burt Gustafson, 96, football coach (Green Bay Packers) (b. 1925)
- October 23
  - Vanilla Beane, 103, milliner and fashion designer (b. 1919)
  - Walt Corey, 84, football player and coach (Kansas City Chiefs, Buffalo Bills) (b. 1938)
  - Don Edwards, 86, cowboy singer (b. 1935–1936)
  - George Nelson Hunt III, 90, Episcopal prelate, bishop of Rhode Island (1980–1994) (b. 1931)
  - Paul Morantz, 77, attorney and investigative journalist (b. 1945)
- October 24
  - Ash Carter, 68, politician, secretary of defense (2015–2017) (b. 1954)
  - Christine Farnon, 97, music industry executive (b. 1925)
  - Ben Feigin, 47, television producer (Schitt's Creek, Cheech & Chong: Roasted), Emmy winner (2020) (b. c. 1975)
  - Leslie Jordan, 67, actor (Will & Grace, Hearts Afire, Call Me Kat), Emmy winner (2006) (b. 1955)
  - Gregg Philbin, 75, rock bassist (REO Speedwagon) (b. 1947)
- October 25
  - Jules Bass, 87, animator and television producer (Rudolph the Red-Nosed Reindeer, Frosty the Snowman, The Last Unicorn) (b. 1935)
  - Barbara Cooper, 93, politician, member of the Tennessee House of Representatives (since 1996) (b. 1929)
  - Mike Davis, 76, author (City of Quartz, Late Victorian Holocausts, Set the Night on Fire) and activist (b. 1946)
  - Gordon Fee, 88, Christian theologian (b. 1934)
  - Peter Gabel, 75, legal scholar and magazine editor (Tikkun) (b. 1947)
  - Jim Halligan, 86, academic administrator (Oklahoma State University) and politician, member of the Oklahoma Senate (2008–2016) (b. 1936)
  - Lewis Kuller, 88, epidemiologist (b. 1934)
  - Phil Straight, 76, politician, member of the New Hampshire House of Representatives (2012–2016) (b. 1946)
  - Charles Wheeler, 96, politician, member of the Missouri Senate (2003–2007) and mayor of Kansas City, Missouri (1971–1979) (b. 1926)
- October 26
  - Lucianne Goldberg, 87, literary agent and author (b. 1935)
  - Julie Powell, 49, author, subject of Julie & Julia (b. 1973)
  - Rosalind Wiener Wyman, 92, politician, member of the Los Angeles city council (1954–1965) (b. 1930)
- October 27
  - Stan Bingham, 76, politician, member of the North Carolina Senate (2001–2017) (b. 1945)
  - Joe Frank, 79, politician, mayor of Newport News, Virginia (1996–2010) (b. 1942)
  - William W. Hay, 88, geologist (b. 1934)
  - Geraldine Hunt, 77, R&B singer ("Can't Fake the Feeling") (b. 1945)
  - Steve Sesnick, 81, band manager (The Velvet Underground) (b. 1941)
  - Gerald Stern, 97, poet (b. 1925)
- October 28
  - Calvin O. Butts, 73, pastor and academic administrator, president of the State University of New York at Old Westbury (1999–2020) (b. 1949)
  - Herman Daly, 84, economist (b. 1938)
  - Vince Dooley, 90, Hall of Fame college football coach (Georgia Bulldogs) (b. 1932)
  - Dan Flynn, 79, politician, businessman and rancher, member of the Texas House of Representatives (2003–2021) (b. 1943)
  - Jerry Lee Lewis, 87, singer, ("Great Balls of Fire", "Whole Lotta Shakin' Going On", "High School Confidential") (b. 1935)
  - D. H. Peligro, 63, drummer (Dead Kennedys, Red Hot Chili Peppers) (b. 1959)
- October 29
  - Curt Gentry, 85, football player (Chicago Bears) and coach (b. 1937)
  - James Giffen, 81, businessman (b. 1941)
  - Paul Larson, 90, football player (Chicago Cardinals, Oakland Raiders) (b. 1932)
- October 30
  - Mike Fanning, 69, football player (Los Angeles Rams, Detroit Lions, Seattle Seahawks) (b. 1953)
  - Anthony Ortega, 94, jazz clarinetist, saxophonist and flautist (b. 1928)
  - Hugh McKean, 55, politician, member of the Colorado House of Representatives (since 2017) (b. 1967)
- October 31
  - Patrick Haggerty, 78, country singer-songwriter (Lavender Country) (b. 1944)
  - Samuel Katz, 95, pediatrician and virologist (b. 1927)
  - John McVay, 91, football coach (New York Giants) and executive (San Francisco 49ers) (b. 1931)
  - Mike Potter, 73, racing driver (NASCAR, CARS Tour) (b. 1949)
  - Sharon Presley, 79, feminist, writer, and activist (b. 1943)
  - Andrew Prine, 86, actor (The Devil's Brigade, Chisum, V) (b. 1936)
  - Adam Zimmer, 38, football coach (New Orleans Saints, Cincinnati Bengals, Minnesota Vikings) (b. 1984)

== November ==
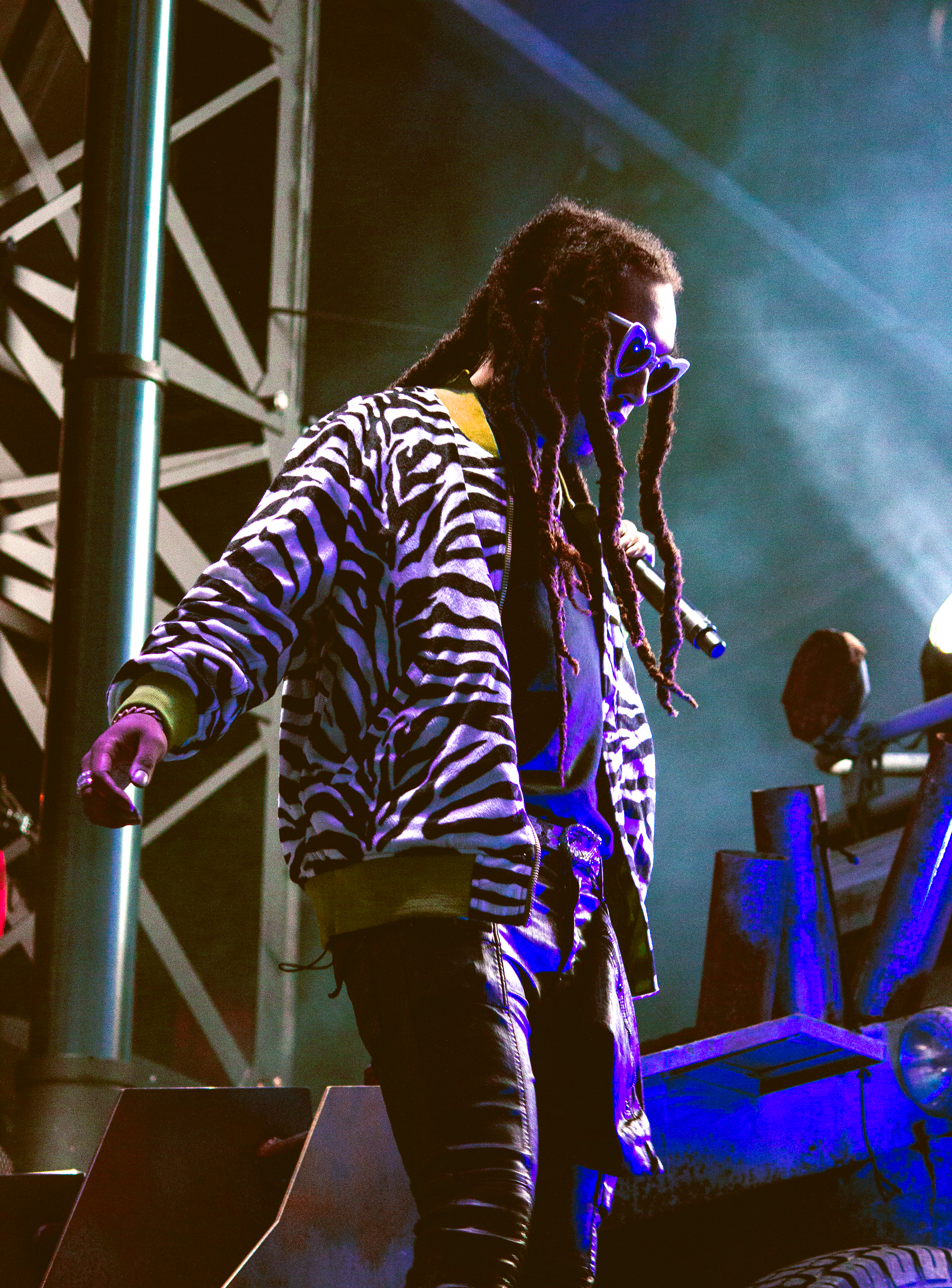
Takeoff

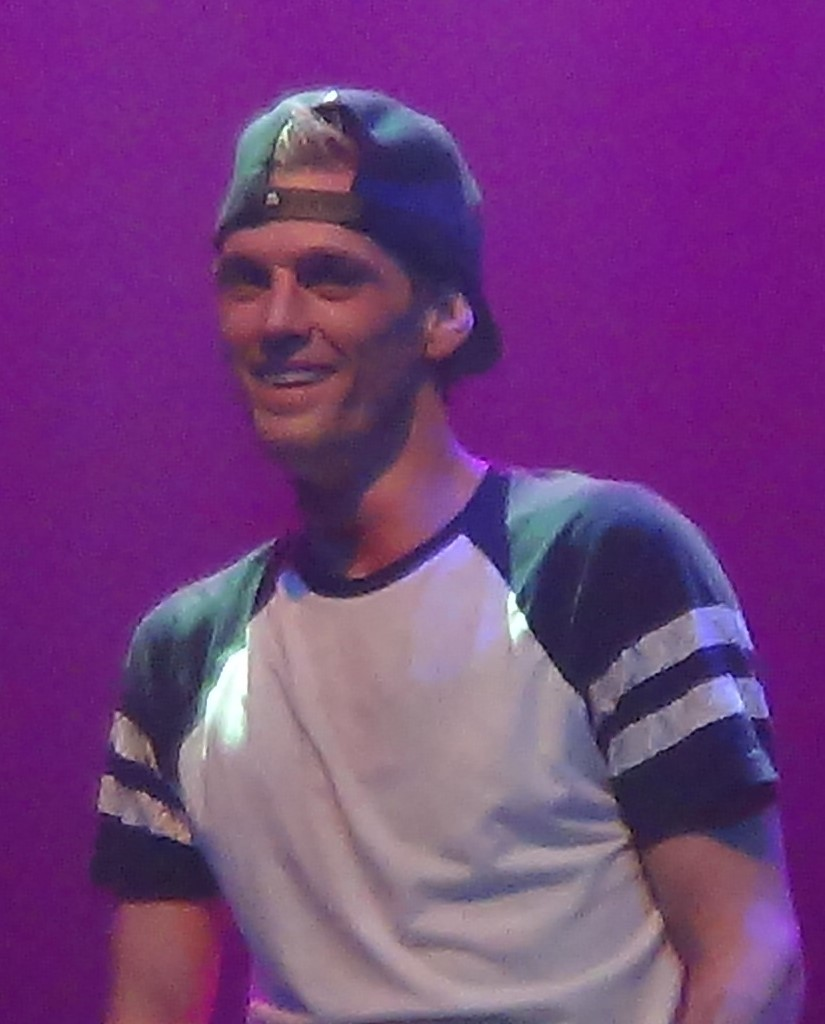
Aaron Carter

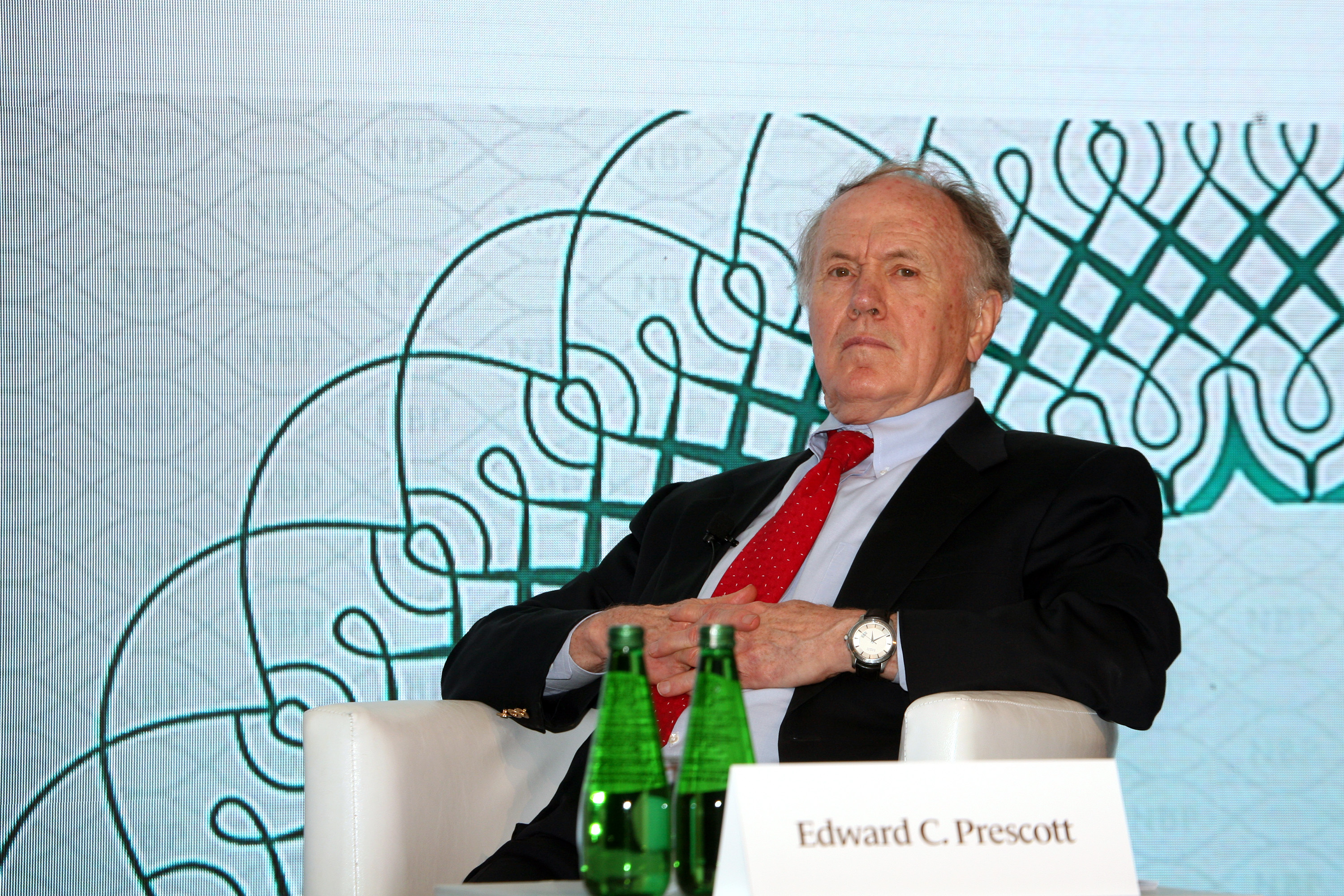
Edward C. Prescott

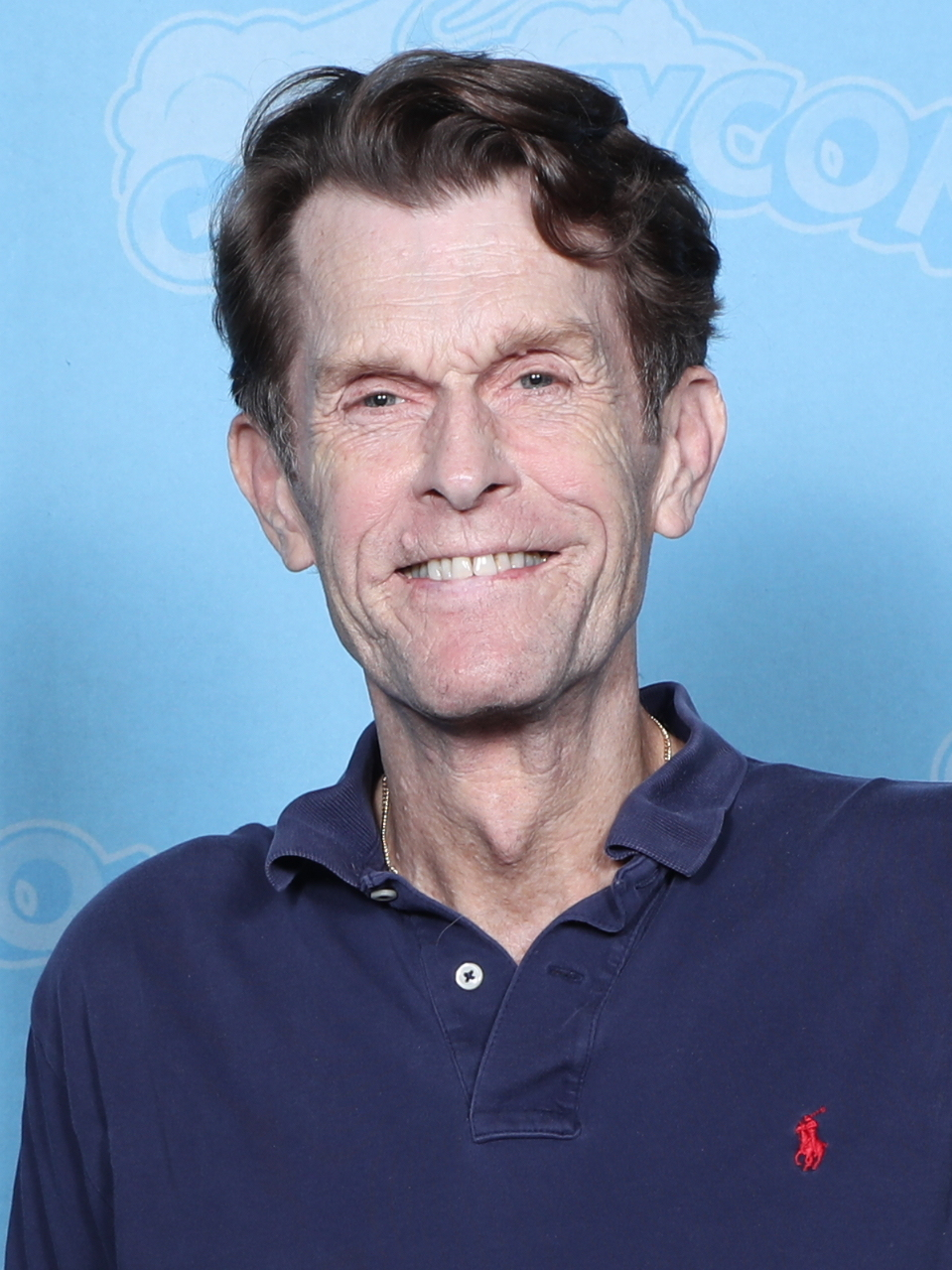
Kevin Conroy

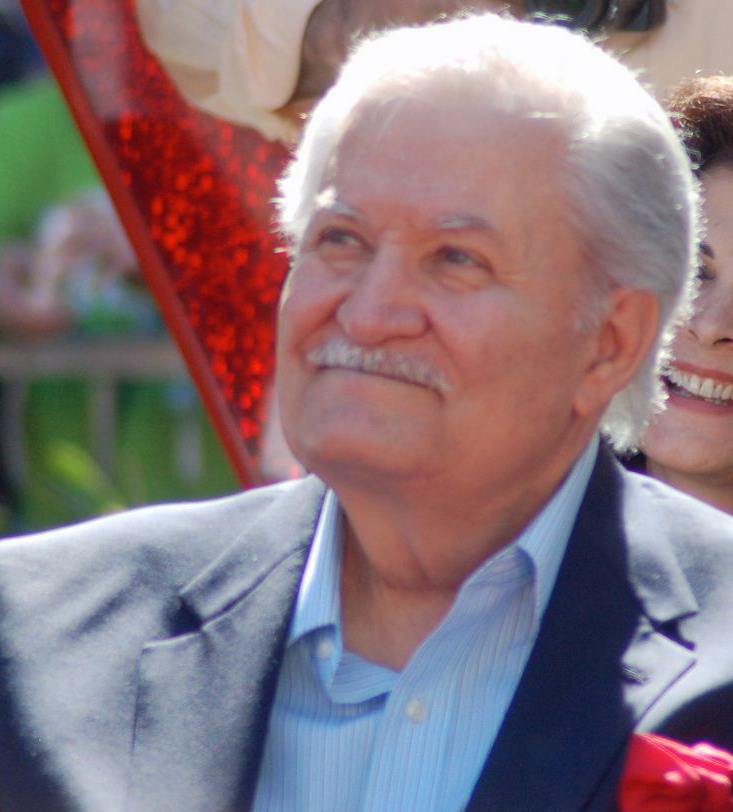
John Aniston

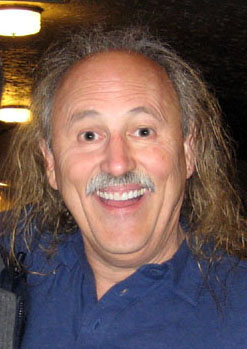
Gallagher

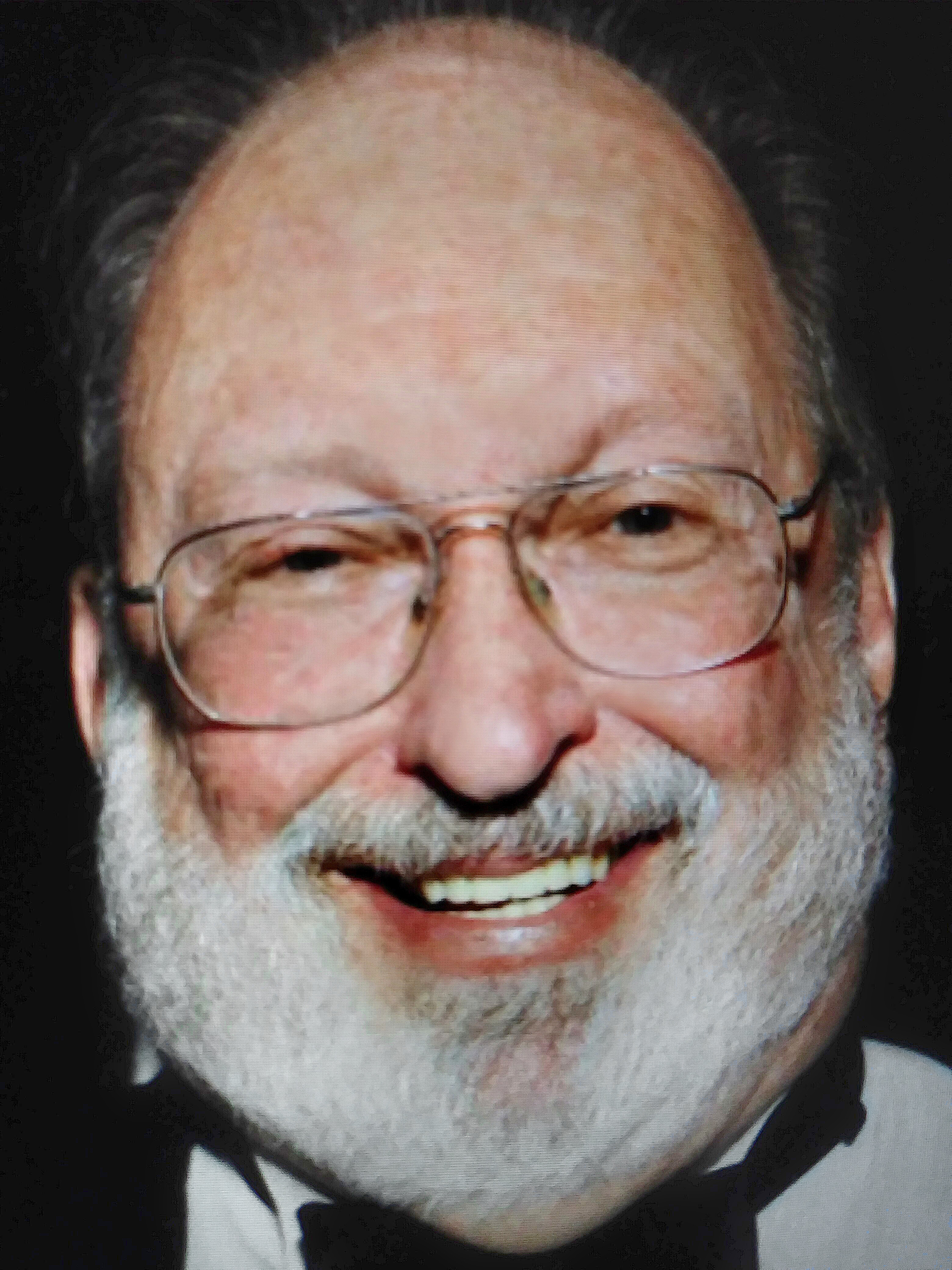
Jim Bohannon

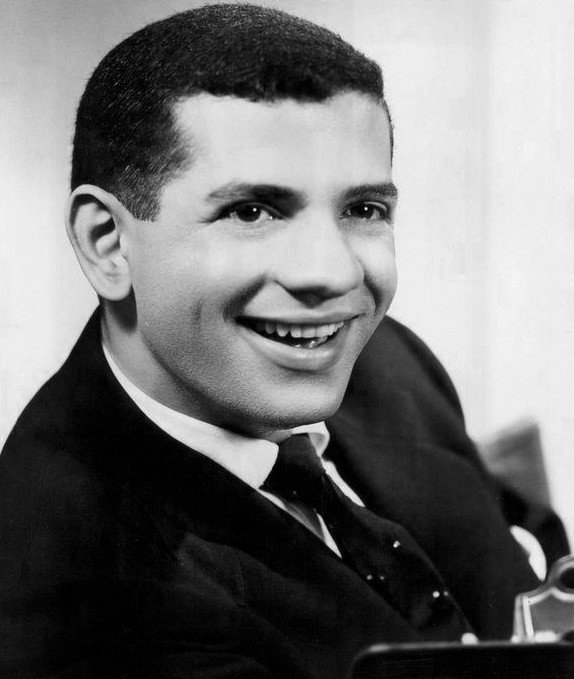
Robert Clary

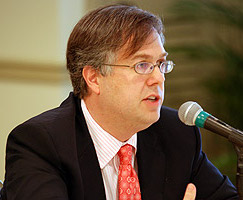
Michael Gerson

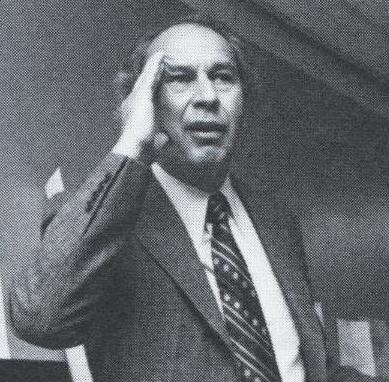
George Lois

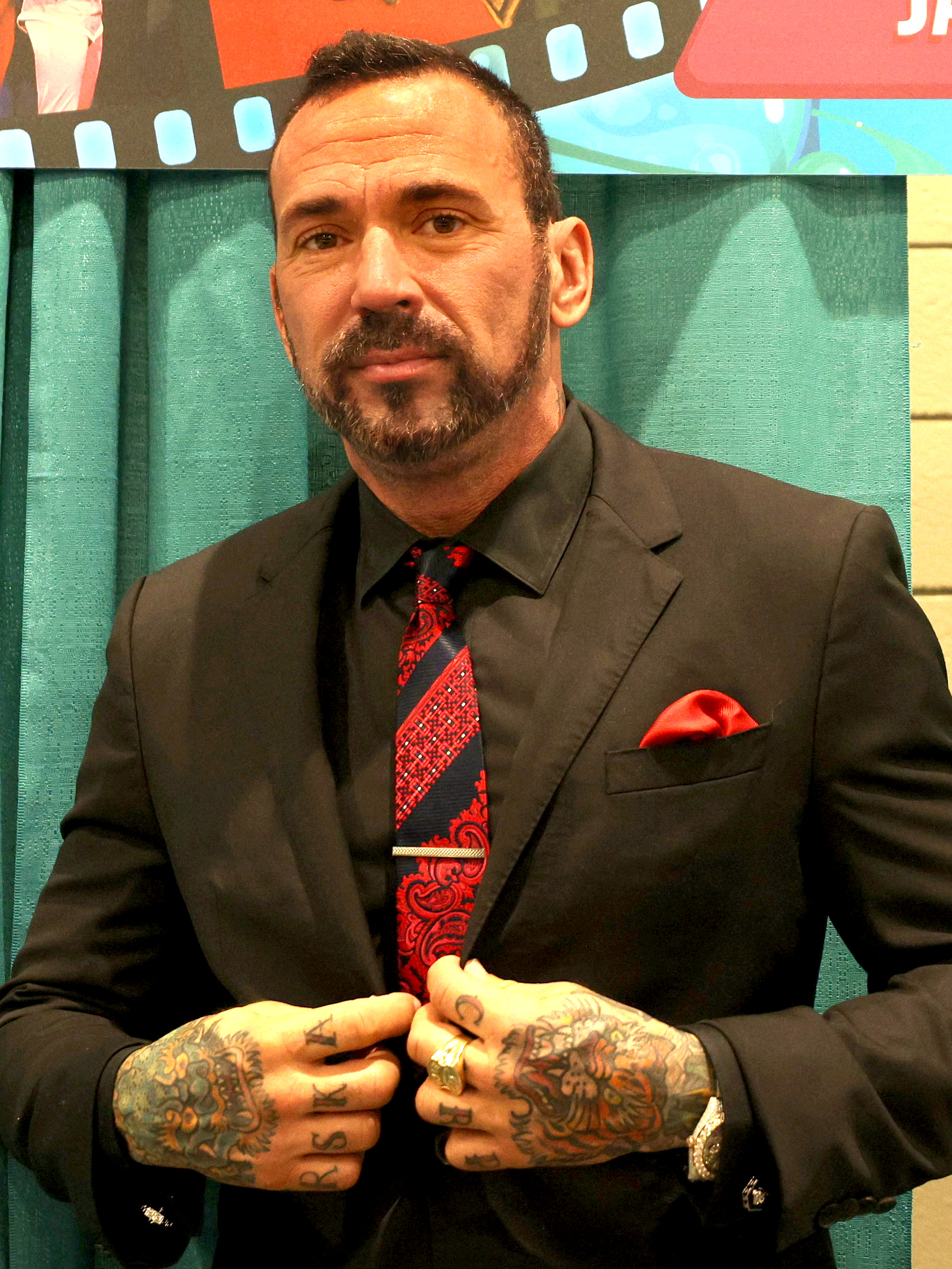
Jason David Frank

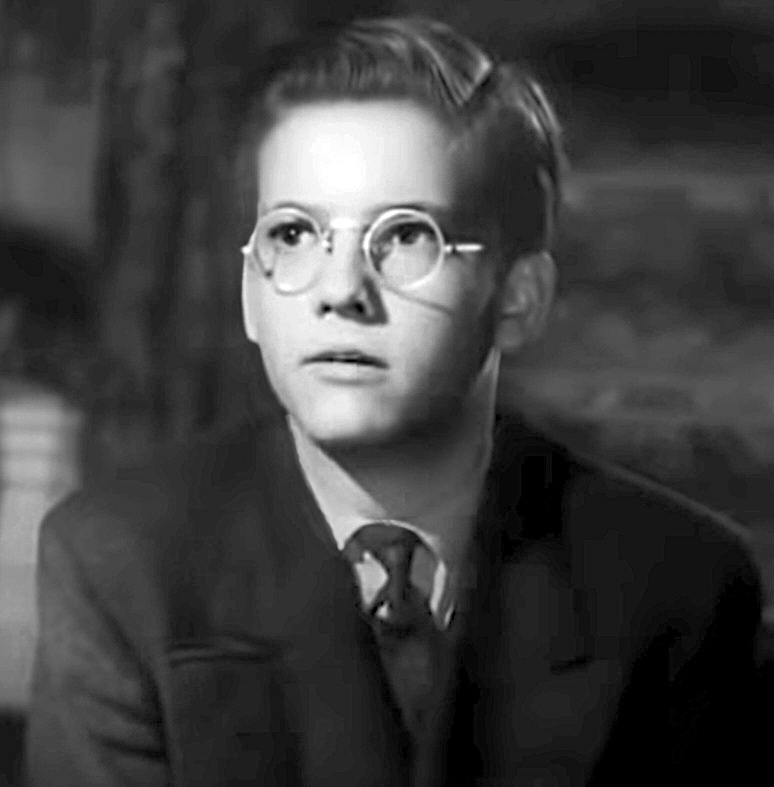
Mickey Kuhn

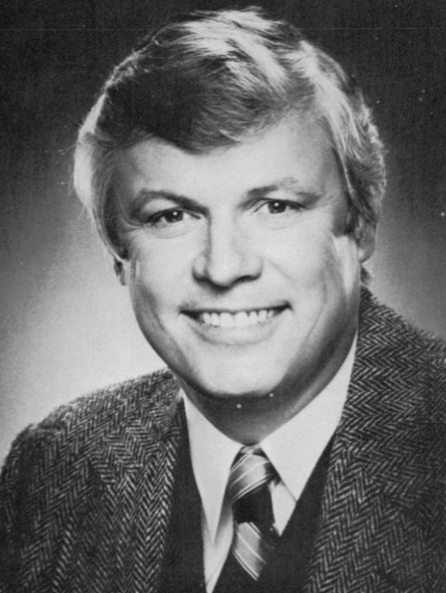
John Y. Brown Jr.

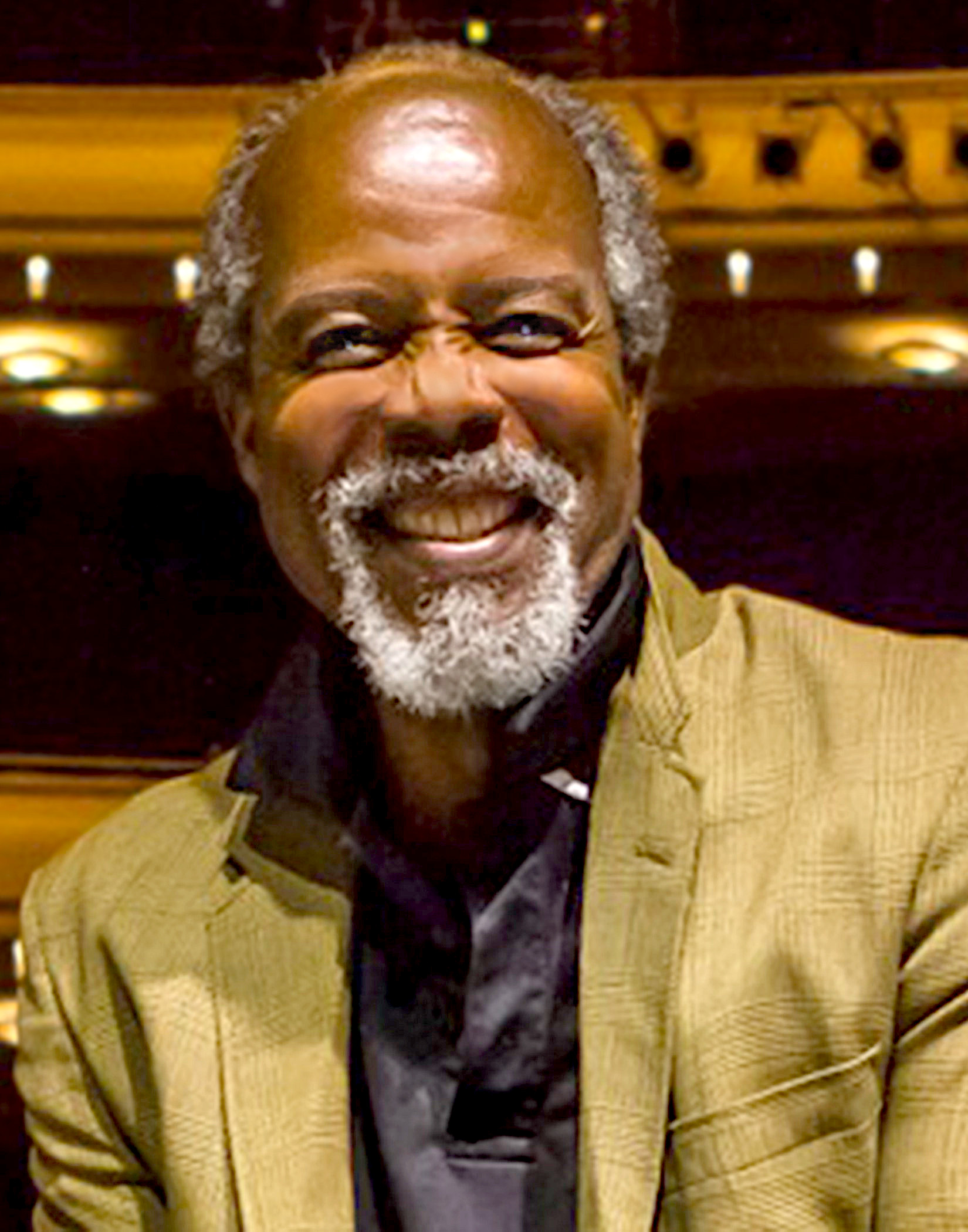
Clarence Gilyard

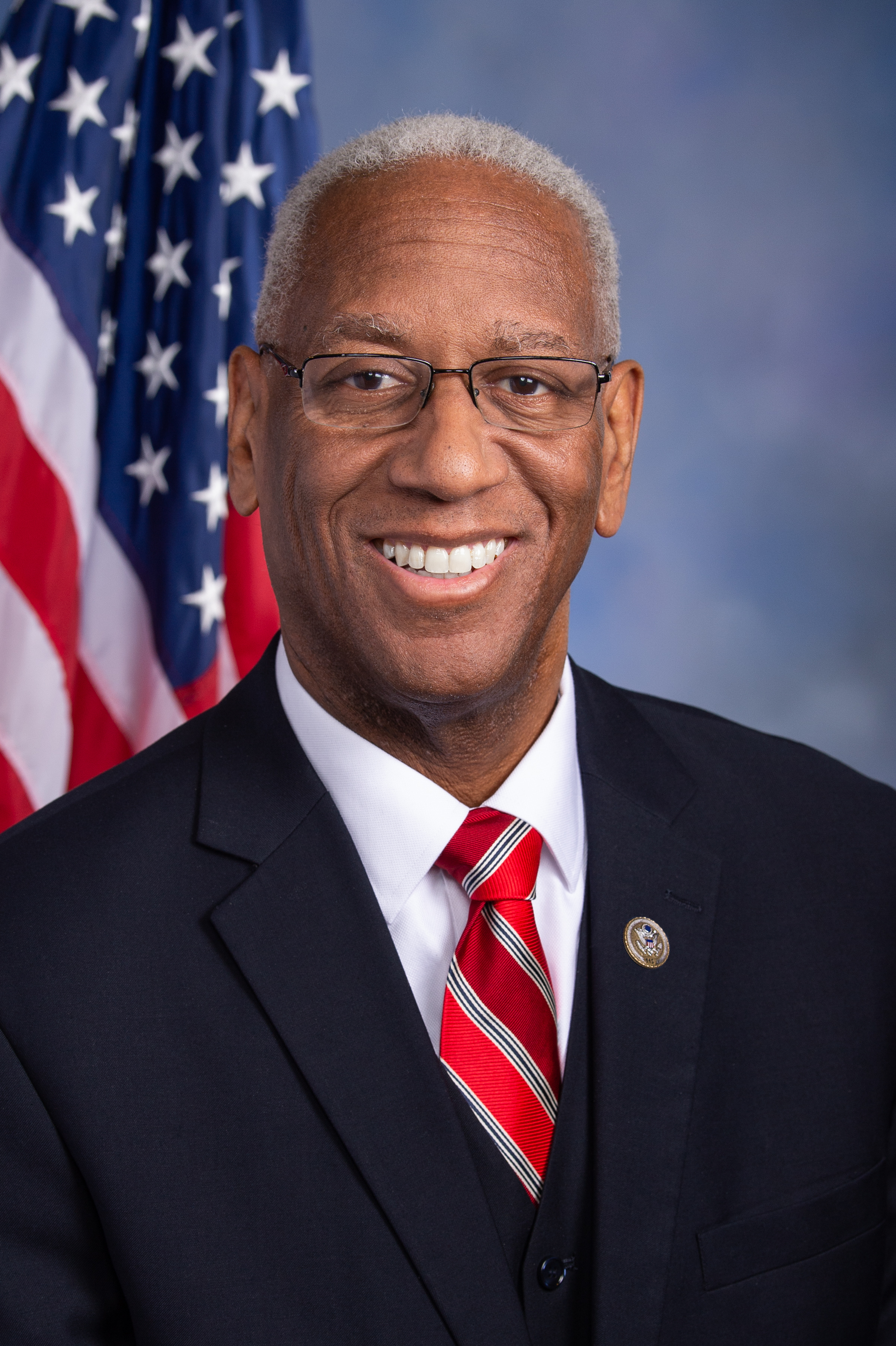
Donald McEachin

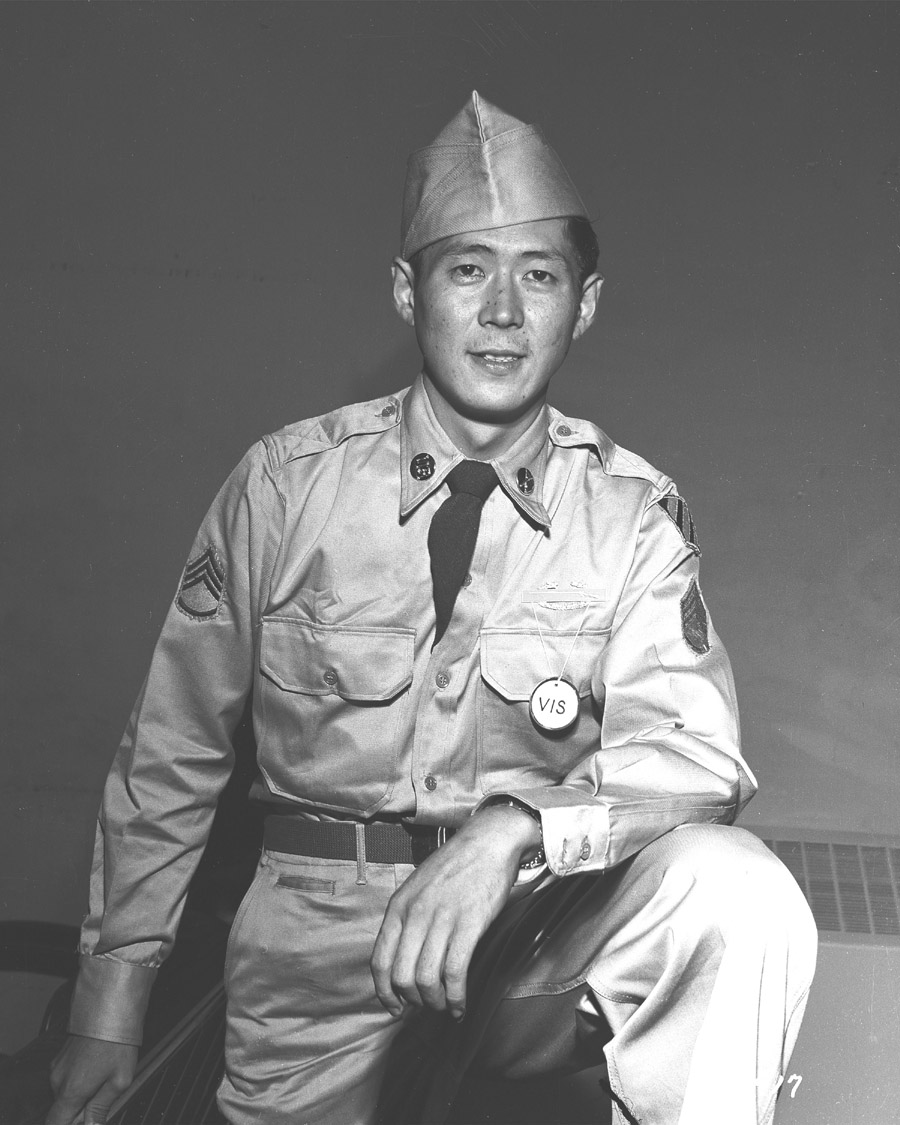
Hiroshi H. Miyamura

- November 1
  - Harry Bates, 95, architect (b. 1927)
  - George Booth, 96, cartoonist (b. 1926)
  - Gael Greene, 88, restaurant critic (New York) (b. 1933)
  - Steven Griffith, 61, Olympic ice hockey player (1984) (b. 1961)
  - Ernie Lazar, 77, researcher (b. 1945)
  - Max Maven, 71, magician and mentalist (b. 1950)
  - Romano Mazzoli, 89, politician and lawyer, member of the U.S. House of Representatives (1971–1995) and Kentucky Senate (1968–1970) (b. 1932)
  - Norman D. Shumway, 88, politician, member of the U.S. House of Representatives (1979–1991) (b. 1934)
  - Takeoff, 28, rapper (Migos) (b. 1994)
  - Joseph Tarsia, 88, recording engineer and studio owner (Sigma Sound Studios) (b. 1934)
- November 2
  - Bubba Cascio, 90, race horse trainer (b. 1932)
  - Gerald Geis, 89, politician, member of the Wyoming Senate (1975–1987, 1993–2017) (b. 1933)
  - John Raymond Henry, 79, sculptor (b. 1943)
  - Doc Kimmel, 95, physician and politician, member of the Florida House of Representatives (1980–1982, 1984–1986) (b. 1926)
  - Ron Watts, 79, basketball player (Boston Celtics) (b. 1943)
- November 3
  - Lois Curtis, 55, artist and disability rights activist (Olmstead v. L.C.) (b. 1967)
  - Alice Estes Davis, 93, costume designer (b. 1929)
  - Ray Guy, 72, Hall of Fame football player (Oakland/Los Angeles Raiders), Super Bowl champion (XI, XV, XVIII) (b. 1949)
  - Douglas McGrath, 64, film director and screenwriter (Emma, Bullets Over Broadway, Saturday Night Live) (b. 1958)
  - Siegfried Stritzl, 78, soccer player (New York Cosmos, national team) (b. 1944)
- November 4
  - Dave Butz, 72, football player (Washington Redskins, St. Louis Cardinals) (b. 1950)
  - Colia Clark, 82, civil rights activist and politician (b. 1940)
  - David Davis, 86, television writer and producer (The Bob Newhart Show, Taxi, Rhoda), Emmy winner (1979) (b. 1936)
  - Dow Finsterwald, 93, professional golfer (b. 1929)
  - Doris Grumbach, 104, novelist and literary critic (The New Republic) (b. 1918)
  - Alvin Segal, 89, businessman and philanthropist (b. 1933)
  - Bill Sheffield, 94, politician, governor of Alaska (1982–1986) (b. 1928)
- November 5
  - Barbara Boyd, 80, politician, member of the Ohio House of Representatives (1992–2000, 2007–2014) (b. 1942)
  - Aaron Carter, 34, singer ("Crush on You", "Aaron's Party (Come Get It)", "Leave It Up to Me") (b. 1987)
  - Coy Gibbs, 49, racing driver (NASCAR Craftsman Truck Series, NASCAR Busch Series), football player (Stanford Cardinal), and coach (b. 1972)
  - Mimi Parker, 55, singer and drummer (Low) (b. 1967)
  - Tame One, 52, rapper (Artifacts, The Weathermen, Leak Bros) (b. 1970)
- November 6
  - Jake Crouthamel, 84, football player (Boston Patriots), coach, and college athletics administrator (b. 1938)
  - Sheila E. Hixson, 89, politician, member of the Maryland House of Delegates (1976–2019) (b. 1933)
  - Hurricane G, 52, rapper (Hit Squad) (b. 1970)
  - Ellen Levine, 79, media executive (b. 1943)
  - Don Lewis, 81, vocalist, electronic multi-instrumentalist, and electronic engineer (b. 1941)
  - Peter McNab, 70, Canadian-born ice hockey player (Buffalo Sabres, New Jersey Devils, Vancouver Canucks) and broadcaster (b. 1952)
  - Edward C. Prescott, 81, economist, Nobel Prize laureate (2004) (b. 1940)
  - Joel Sherzer, 80, anthropological linguist (b. 1942)
  - John Stone, 73, law enforcement official and former sheriff of Jefferson County, Colorado (b. 1949)
- November 7
  - Michael Butler, 95, theater producer (Hair) (b. 1926)
  - Jeff Cook, 73, musician (Alabama) (b. 1949)
  - Kendrick Frazier, 80, science fiction writer and skeptic (Skeptical Inquirer) (b. 1942)
  - Brian O'Doherty, 94, Irish-born art critic (b. 1928)
- November 8
  - Lee Bontecou, 91, sculptor (b. 1931)
  - Mary Lythgoe Bradford, 92, editor (Dialogue: A Journal of Mormon Thought) (b. 1930)
  - Adrian Dingle, 45, football player (San Diego Chargers) (b. 1977)
  - Doug Johnson, 80, politician, member of the Minnesota House of Representatives (1971–1972) and Senate (1977–2002) (b. 1942)
  - Maurice Karnaugh, 98, physicist, mathematician and inventor (Karnaugh map) (b. 1924)
  - George Young, 85, runner, Olympic bronze medallist (1968) (b. 1937)
- November 9
  - Jane Gross, 75, sportswriter (Newsday, The New York Times) (b. 1947)
  - Fred Hickman, 66, broadcaster (CNN, ESPN, Black News Channel), Emmy winner (2004) (b. 1956)
- November 10
  - Debra R. Anderson, 73, politician, speaker of the South Dakota House of Representatives (1987–1988) (b. 1949)
  - Kevin Conroy, 66, voice actor (Batman: The Animated Series, Justice League, Batman Beyond) (b. 1955)
  - Gary Martin, 64, journalist (Las Vegas Review-Journal) (b. 1958)
  - Jack Reed, 89, baseball player (New York Yankees) (b. 1933)
- November 11
  - John Aniston, 89, Greek-born actor (Days of Our Lives, Love of Life, Search for Tomorrow) (b. 1933)
  - Gallagher, 76, comedian (b. 1946)
  - Henry Rosovsky, 95, economist and academic administrator (b. 1927)
- November 12
  - Jim Bohannon, 78, broadcaster (America in The Morning) (b. 1944)
  - Gene Cipriano, 94, woodwindist and session musician (The Wrecking Crew) (b. 1928)
  - Budd Friedman, 90, comedian and producer, founder of The Improv (b. 1932)
  - Carroll Hubbard, 85, politician, member of the U.S. House of Representatives (1975–1993) and Kentucky Senate (1968–1975) (b. 1937)
  - Frank D. Robinson, 92, aeronautical engineer (Robinson R22, Robinson R44), founder of Robinson Helicopter Company (b. 1930)
  - Steve Webber, 74, baseball coach (Georgia Bulldogs) (b. 1947)
- November 13
  - Chuck Carr, 55, baseball player (Florida Marlins, New York Mets, Milwaukee Brewers) (b. 1967)
  - Anthony Johnson, 38, mixed martial artist (b. 1984)
  - Barbara Love, 85, feminist writer (b. 1937)
  - Brent Moss, 50, football player (Wisconsin Badgers, St. Louis Rams) (b. 1972)
- November 14
  - Kristie Macrakis, 64, historian (b. 1958)
  - Virginia McLaurin, 113, social worker (b. 1909)
  - Kay Meredith, 86, equestrian, writer and novelist (b. 1936)
- November 15
  - John Palasik, 68, politician, member of the Vermont House of Representatives (since 2019) (b. 1954)
  - Gene Perret, 85, television producer and writer (The Carol Burnett Show, Welcome Back, Kotter, Three's Company), Emmy winner (1974, 1975, 1978) (b. 1937)
- November 16
  - Nicki Aycox, 47, actress (Dark Blue, Jeepers Creepers 2, Supernatural) (b. 1975)
  - Robert Clary, 96, French-born actor (Hogan's Heroes, Days of Our Lives, The Bold and the Beautiful) (b. 1926)
  - Mick Goodrick, 77, jazz guitarist (b. 1945)
  - Carol Leigh, 71, activist (b. 1951)
  - Michael Pertschuk, 89, British-born attorney, commissioner of the Federal Trade Commission (1977–1984) (b. 1933)
  - David Ralston, 68, politician, member (since 2003) and speaker (since 2010) of the Georgia House of Representatives, member of the State Senate (1993–1999) (b. 1954)
- November 17
  - Fred Brooks, 91, computer scientist (OS/360) and writer (The Mythical Man-Month) (b. 1931)
  - Michael Gerson, 58, journalist (The Washington Post) and speechwriter, White House Director of Speechwriting (2001–2006) (b. 1964)
  - Anne Harris, 58, author (b. 1964)
  - Staughton Lynd, 92, conscientious objector, peace activist, and civil rights activist (b. 1929)
  - Ken Mansfield, 85, record producer (The Beatles) (b. 1937)
  - B. Smyth, 28, R&B singer (b. 1994)
  - Tomáš Svoboda, 82, French-born composer and pianist (b. 1939)
  - Ted Wheeler, 91, Olympic middle-distance runner (1956) (b. 1931)
  - Ellen Wittlinger, 74, author (Hard Love) (b. 1948)
- November 18
  - Steve Braun, 63, politician, member of the Indiana House of Representatives (2012–2014) (b. 1958)
  - Bruce L. Christensen, 79, television executive, President of PBS (1984–1992) (b. 1943)
  - Tommy Facenda, 83, rock and roll singer and guitarist (b. 1939)
  - Dwight Garner, 58, football player (California Golden Bears, Washington Redskins) (b. 1964)
  - George Lois, 91, art director (Esquire) and advertising executive, co-founder of Papert Koenig Lois (b. 1931)
  - Ned Rorem, 99, composer (Miss Julie, Bertha, Air Music) (b. 1923)
- November 19
  - Greg Bear, 71, science fiction writer (The Forge of God, Queen of Angels, Blood Music) (b. 1951)
  - Raymond Blanco, 87, football coach and academic administrator (b. 1935)
  - Jason David Frank, 49, actor (Mighty Morphin Power Rangers, Sweet Valley High, The Junior Defenders) and mixed martial artist (b. 1973)
  - Danny Kalb, 80, blues guitarist (The Blues Project) (b. 1942)
  - Edward Staback, 85, politician, member of the Pennsylvania House of Representatives (1985–2013) (b. 1937)
- November 20
  - Joyce Bryant, 95, singer, dancer and civil rights activist (b. 1927)
  - Buster Drayton, 70, boxer (b. 1942)
  - Gray Frederickson, 85, film producer (The Godfather, Apocalypse Now, The Outsiders), Oscar winner (1974) (b. 1937)
  - Michael Armand Hammer, 67, businessman (b. 1955)
  - Dave Hillman, 95, baseball player (Chicago Cubs, Boston Red Sox, New York Mets) (b. 1927)
  - Mickey Kuhn, 90, actor (Gone with the Wind, Red River, Broken Arrow) (b. 1932)
  - Albert Nipon, 95, fashion designer (b. 1927)
  - Jay Pasachoff, 79, astronomer (b. 1943)
- November 21
  - Bill Bergan, 80, college athletics coach (Iowa State Cyclones) (b. 1942)
  - Michael Feingold, 77, critic (The Village Voice), translator, and playwright (b. 1945)
  - E. P. Sanders, 85, New Testament scholar (New Perspective on Paul) (b. 1937)
- November 22
  - John Y. Brown Jr., 88, businessman and politician, governor of Kentucky (1979–1983) and co-owner of KFC (1963–1971) (b. 1933)
  - Vic Carrabotta, 93, comic book artist (Journey into Mystery) (b. 1929)
  - George Donnelly, 80, football player (San Francisco 49ers) (b. 1942)
  - Cecilia Suyat Marshall, 94, civil rights activist and historian (b. 1928)
  - Bernadette Mayer, 77, poet and writer (b. 1945)
  - Ota Ulč, 92, Czech-born author and columnist (b. 1930)
  - Raymond Wieczorek, 93, politician, member of the Executive Council of New Hampshire (2002–2012) and mayor of Manchester, New Hampshire (1990–2000) (b. 1928)
- November 23
  - Betty Ray McCain, 91, politician and political strategist (b. 1931)
  - O'dell Owens, 74, physician, public health official and health advocate (b. 1947)
- November 24
  - Richard Lawrence, 80, politician, member of the Vermont House of Representatives (2005–2019) (b. 1942)
  - James J. Lorimer, 96, attorney, co-founder of Arnold Sports Festival (b. 1926)
- November 25
  - Irene Cara, 63, singer ("Flashdance... What a Feeling") and actress (Sparkle, Fame), Oscar winner (1983) (b. 1959)
  - David Ray Griffin, 83, professor, author (The New Pearl Harbor), and 9/11 conspiracy theorist, co-founder of the Center for Process Studies (b. 1939)
  - Charles Koppelman, 82, music executive (EMI) and co-founder of SBK Records (b. 1940)
  - Don Newkirk, 56, musician, composer and record producer (b. 1967)
- November 26
  - Eleanor Jackson Piel, 102, civil rights lawyer (b. 1920)
  - Albert Pyun, 69, film director (The Sword and the Sorcerer, Cyborg, Captain America) (b. 1953)
  - Mike Robinson, 66, football player (Cleveland Browns), (b. 1956)
  - Freddie Roman, 85, stand-up comedian and actor (Finding North, Red Oaks) (b. 1937)
  - Paul J. Swain, 79, Roman Catholic prelate, bishop of Sioux Falls (2006–2019) (b. 1943)
  - Louise Tobin, 104, jazz singer (b. 1918)
  - Charles Wolf, 96, basketball coach (Cincinnati Royals, Detroit Pistons) (b. 1926)
- November 27
  - Robert Blum, 94, Olympic fencer (1964, 1968) (b. 1928)
  - Jake Flint, 37, Red Dirt singer-songwriter (b. 1985)
  - Freddie Ross Hancock, 92, British-born publicist (b. 1930)
  - Liz VanLeeuwen, 97, politician, member of the Oregon House of Representatives (1981–1999) (b. 1925)
- November 28
  - Cliff Emmich, 85, actor (Payday, Thunderbolt and Lightfoot) (b. 1936)
  - Clarence Gilyard, 66, actor (Walker, Texas Ranger, Die Hard, Matlock) and university professor (b. 1955)
  - Donald McEachin, 61, politician, member of the U.S. House of Representatives (since 2017) (b. 1961)
  - Ramsay MacMullen, 94, historian (b. 1928)
  - Milton Street, 81, entrepreneur and politician, member of the Pennsylvania State Senate (1981–1984) and House of Representatives (1979–1980) (b. 1941)
- November 29
  - Mike Addesa, 77, college ice hockey coach (Holy Cross, Rensselaer, Boston Bulldogs) (b. 1945)
  - Brad William Henke, 56, actor (Orange Is the New Black, Bright) and football player (Denver Broncos) (b. 1966)
  - Steve Jensen, 67, Olympic ice hockey player (1976) (b. 1955)
  - Kevin Johnson Jr., 37, convicted murderer (b. 1985)
  - Aline Kominsky-Crumb, 74, underground comics artist (Twisted Sisters, Wimmen's Comix, Weirdo) (b. 1948)
  - Hiroshi H. Miyamura, 97, soldier, Medal of Honor recipient (b. 1925)
  - Jeff Moore, 56, college basketball player (Auburn Tigers) (b. 1966)
  - John Prados, 71, author and historian (b. 1951)
  - Richard Shelton, 89, author and poet (b. 1933)
  - Chuck Stobart, 90, college football player (Ohio Bobcats) and coach (Toledo Rockets, Utah Utes) (b. 1932)
- November 30
  - Al Bemiller, 84, football player (Buffalo Bills) (b. 1938)
  - Ashley Bickerton, 63, Barbadian-born visual artist (b. 1959)
  - John Hadl, 82, Hall of Fame football player (San Diego Chargers, Los Angeles Rams, Green Bay Packers) and coach (b. 1940)
  - Billy Hudson, 84, politician, member of the Mississippi State Senate (2008–2020) (b. 1938)
  - Ray Nelson, 91, science fiction writer (The Ganymede Takeover, The Prometheus Man) (b. 1931)
  - Shatzi Weisberger, 92, civil rights activist (b. 1930)
  - Hale Zukas, 79, disability rights activist (b. 1943)

== December ==
Gaylord Perry

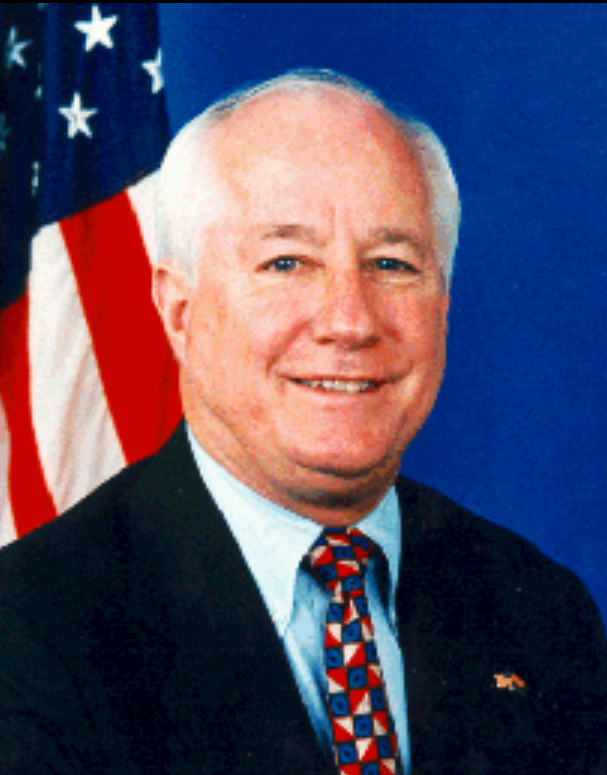
Jim Kolbe

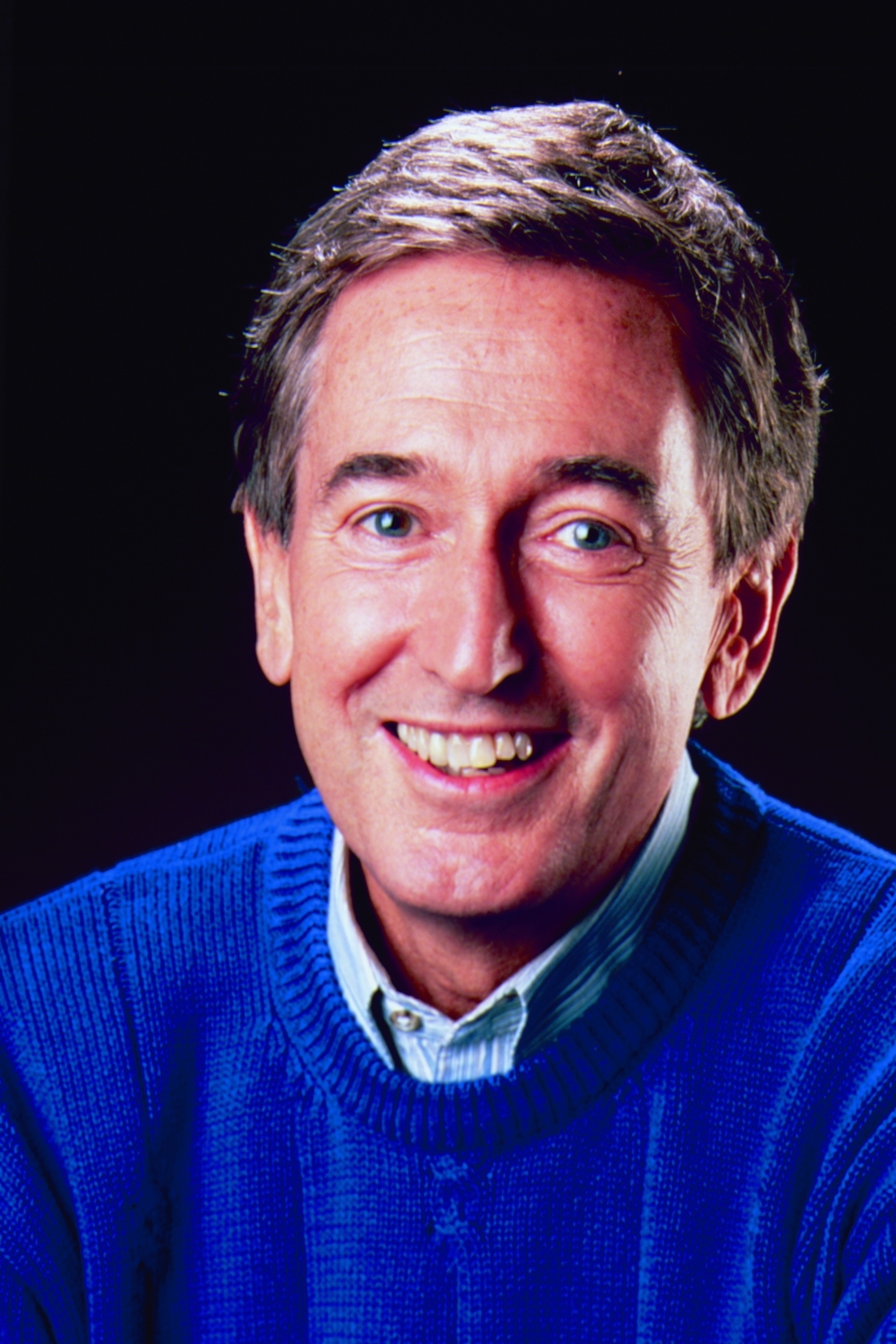
Bob McGrath

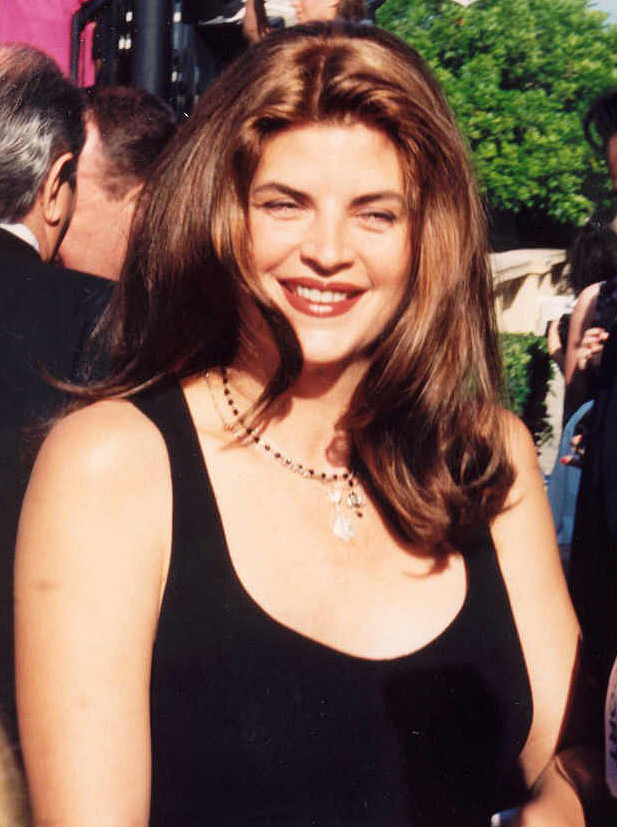
Kirstie Alley

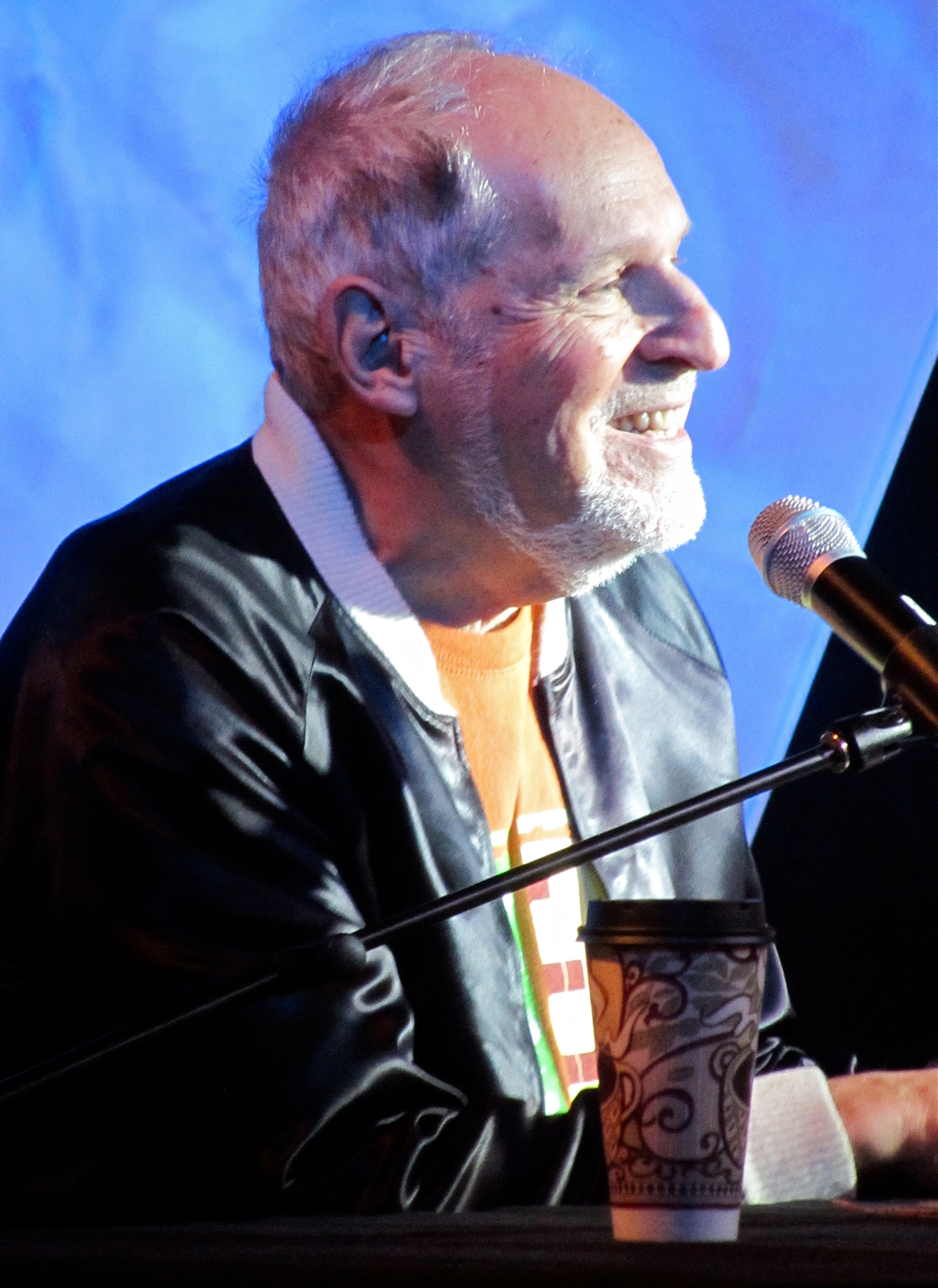
Herbert Deutsch

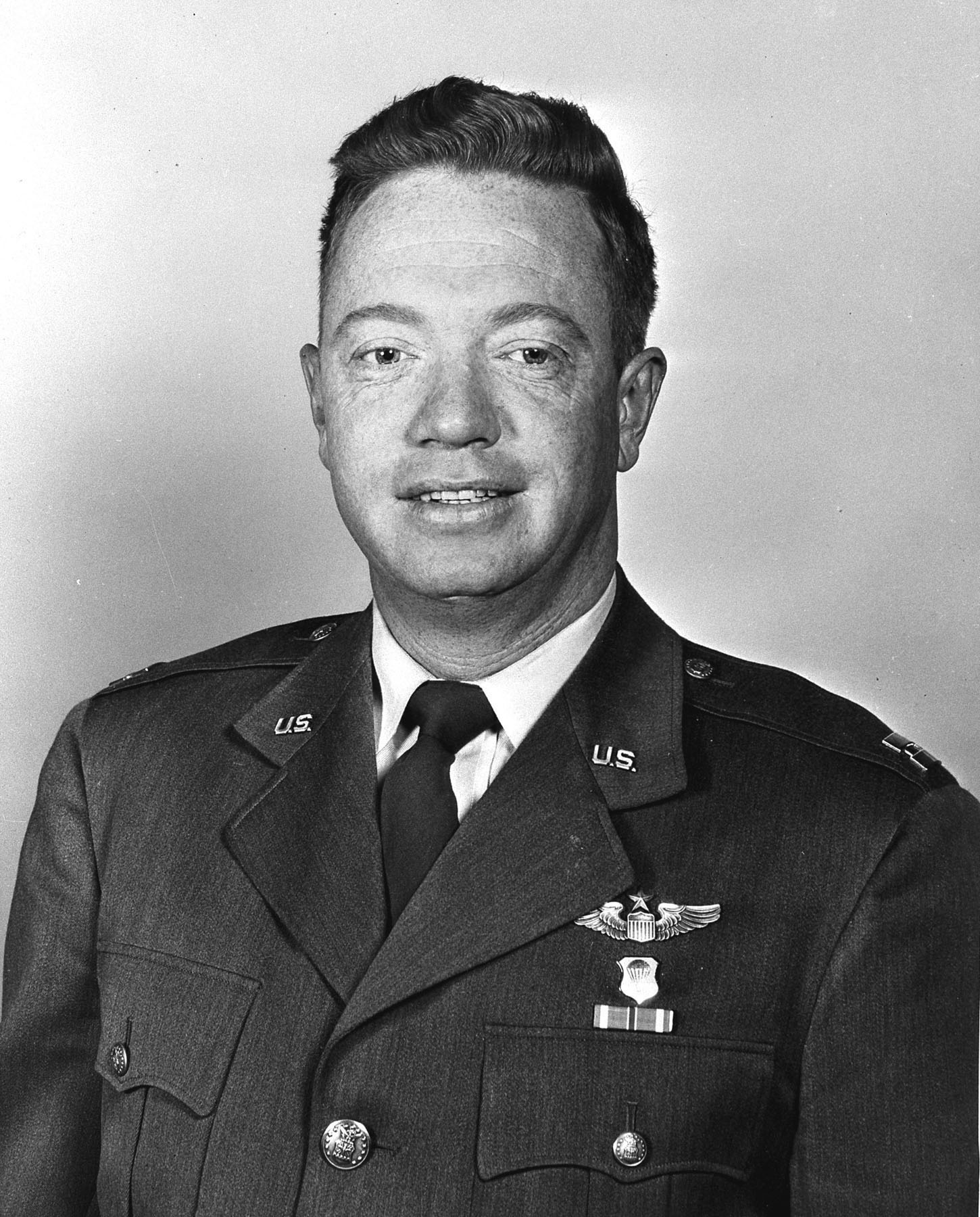
Joseph Kittinger

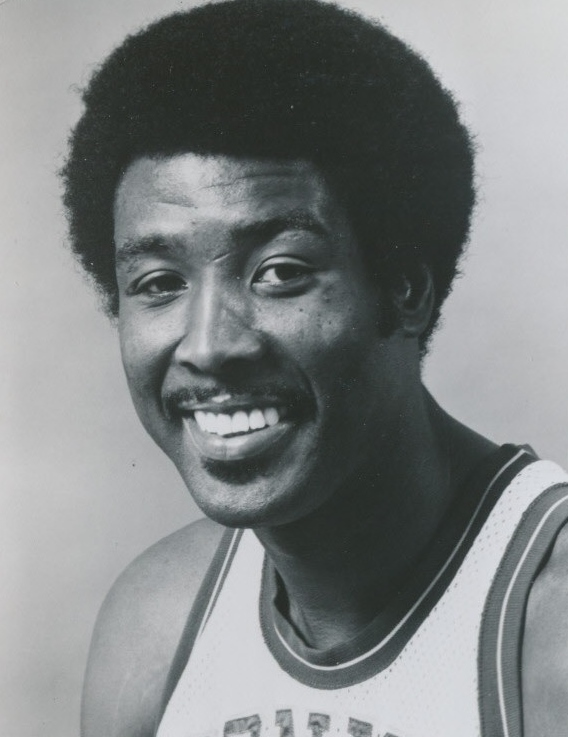
Paul Silas

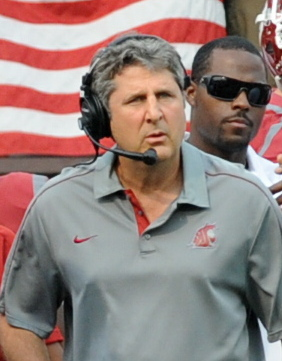
Mike Leach

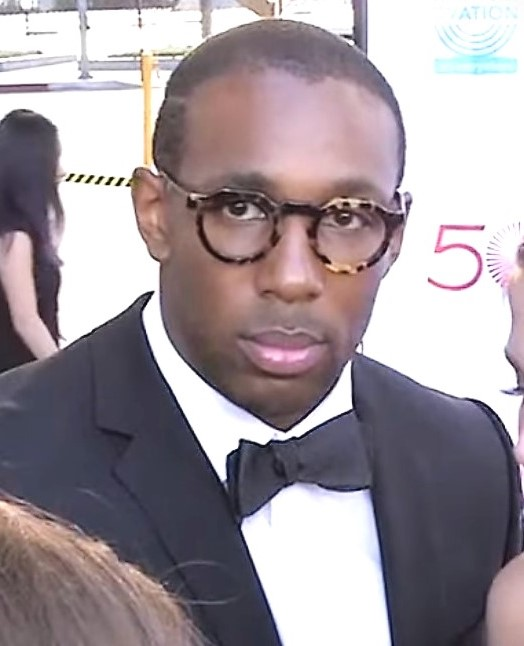
Stephen "tWitch" Boss

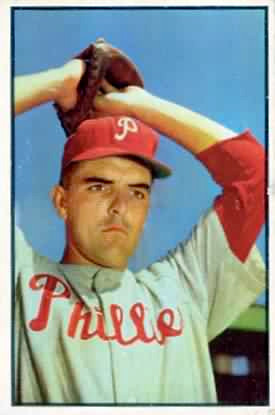
Curt Simmons

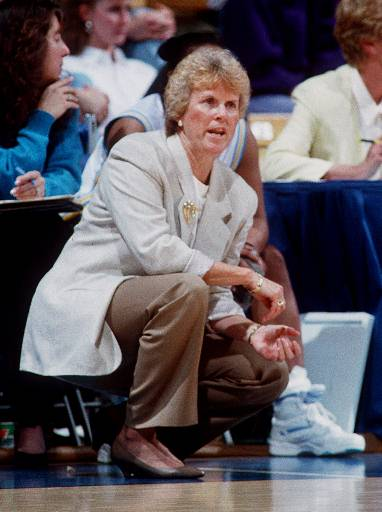
Billie Moore

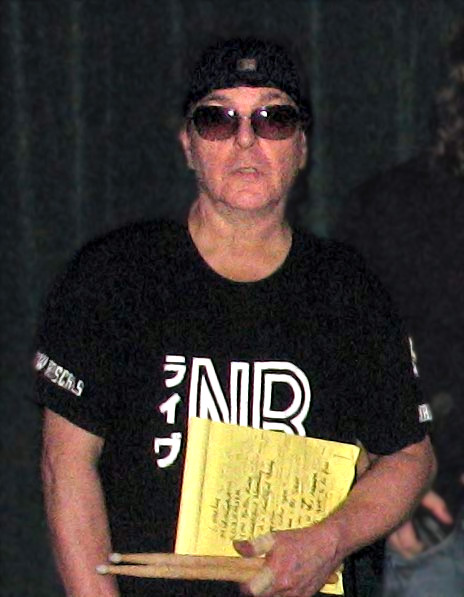
Dino Danelli

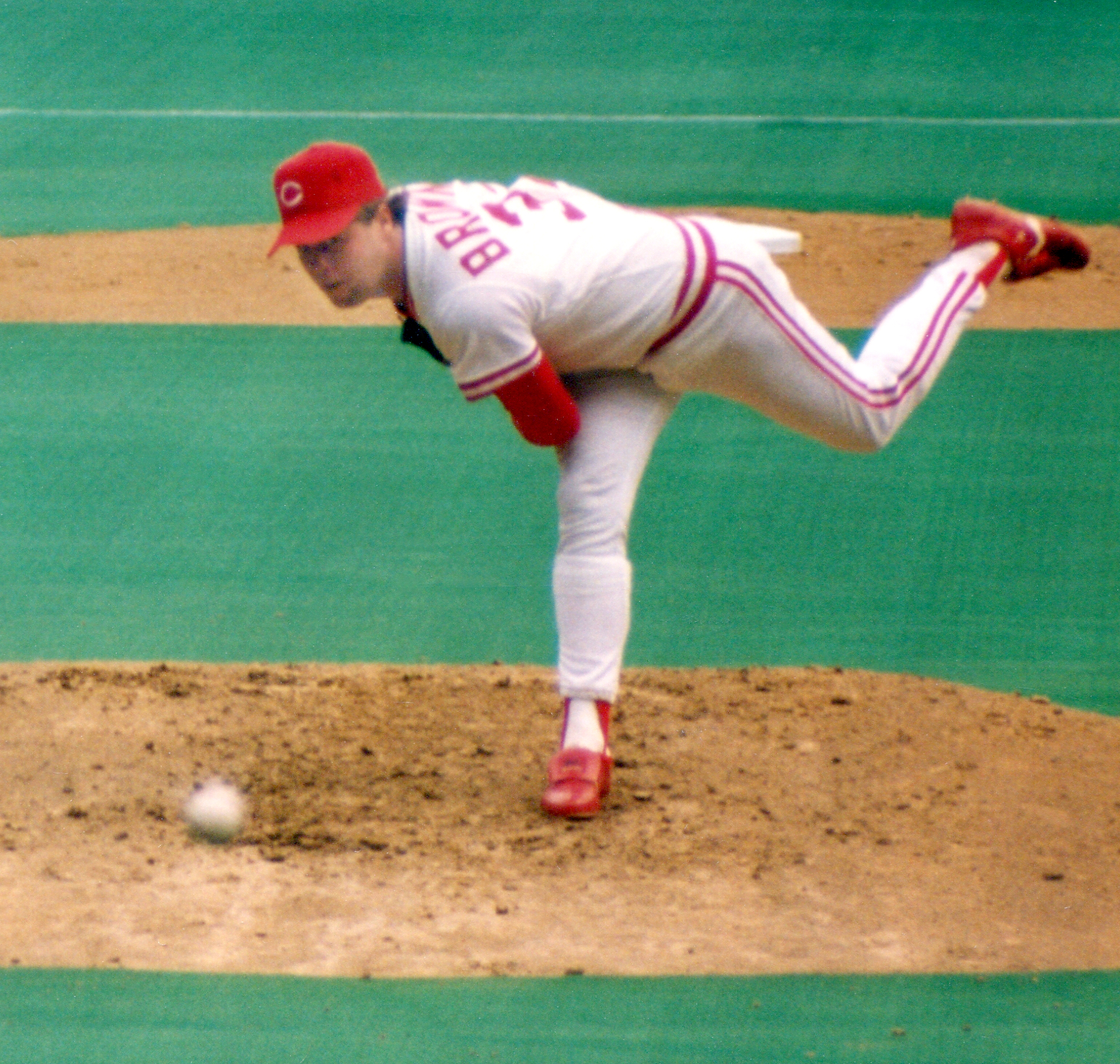
Tom Browning

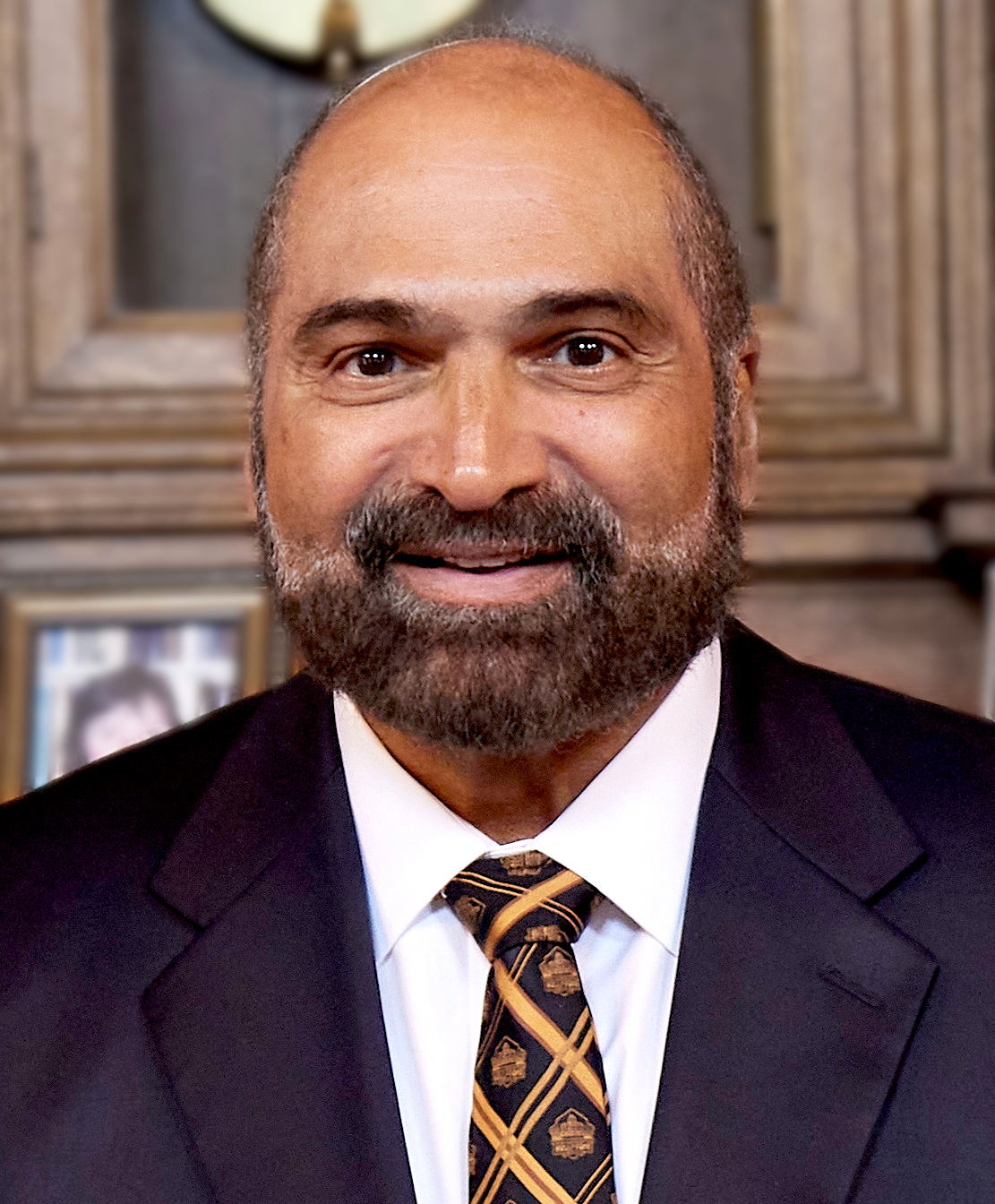
Franco Harris

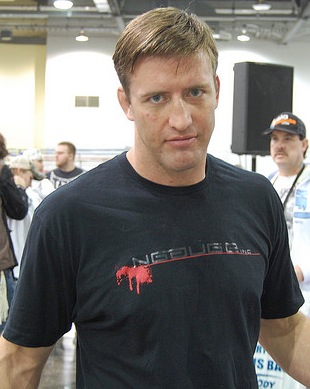
Stephan Bonnar

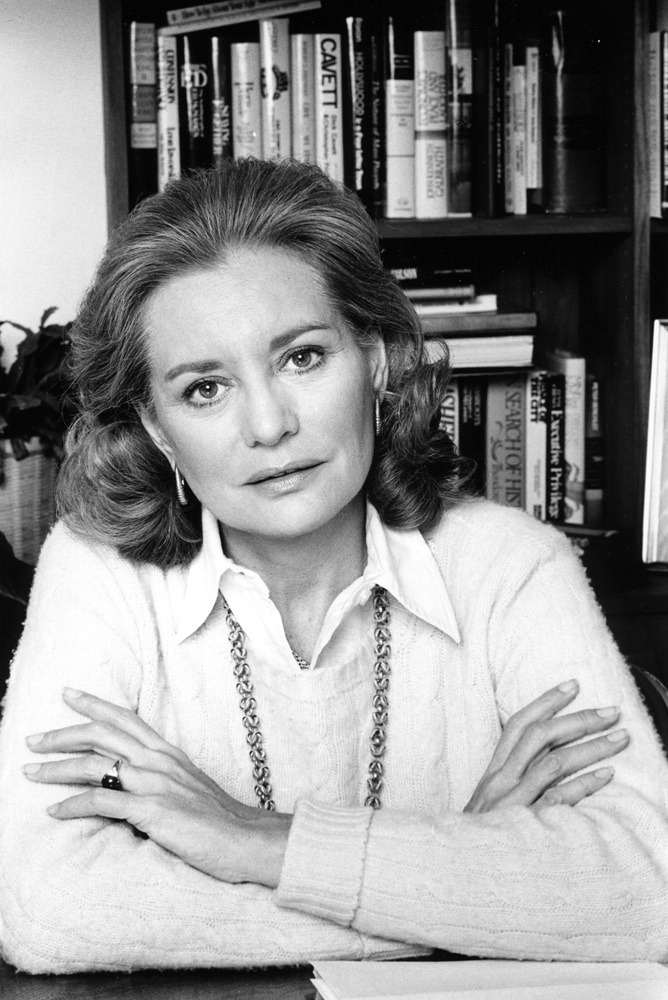
Barbara Walters

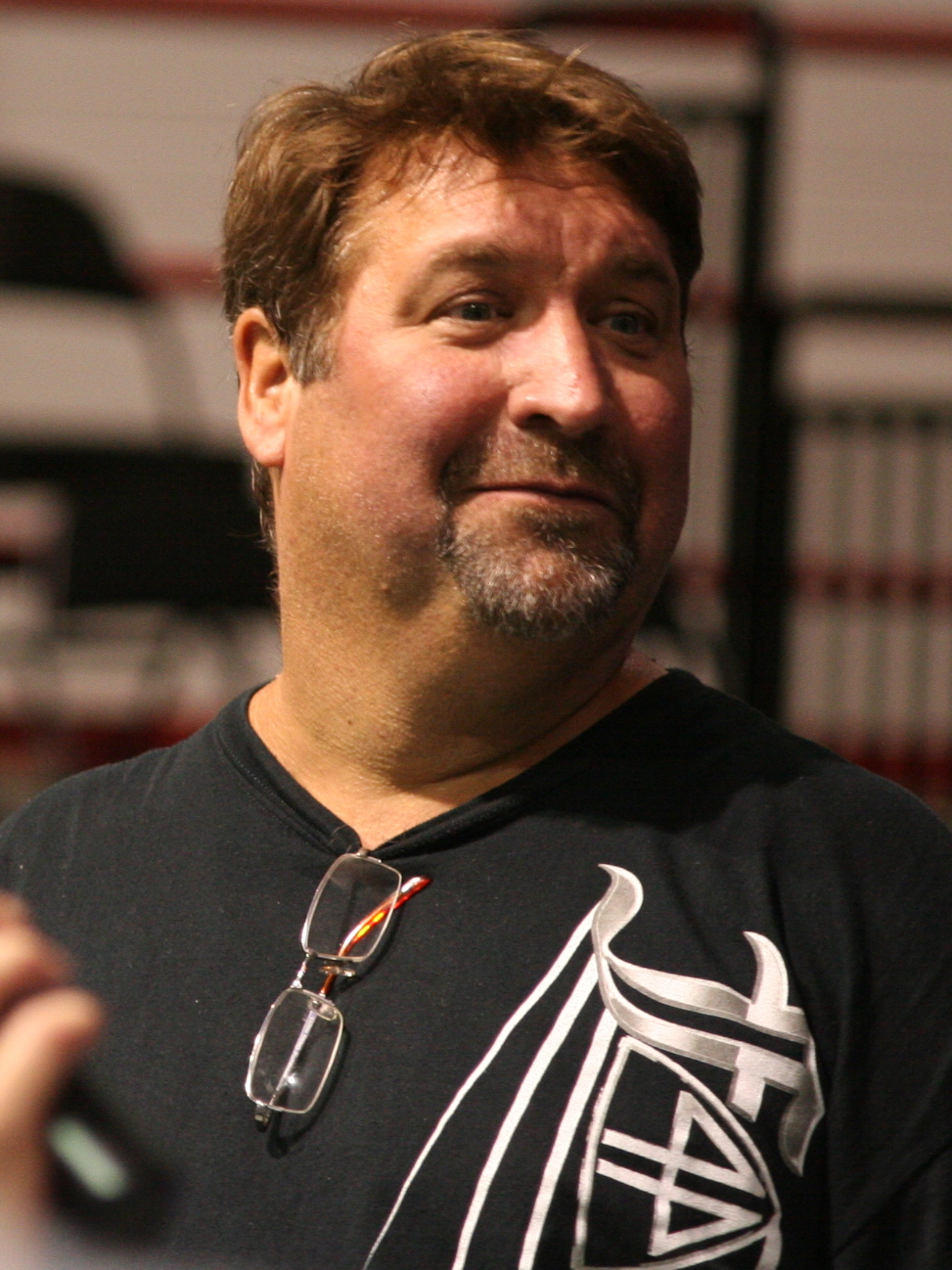
Don West

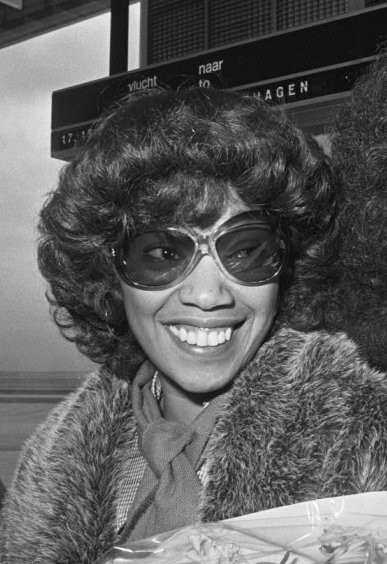
Anita Pointer

- December 1
  - Skip Cleaver, 78, politician, member of the New Hampshire House of Representatives (2016–2022) (b. 1944)
  - Thomas C. Corrigan, 84, politician, member of the Pennsylvania House of Representatives (1987–2006) (b. 1938)
  - Gary LaPaille, 68, politician, member of the Illinois Senate (1993–1995) (b. 1954)
  - Gaylord Perry, 84, Hall of Fame baseball player (San Francisco Giants, Cleveland Indians, San Diego Padres) (b. 1938)
  - Dorothy Pitman Hughes, 84, feminist (b. 1938)
  - Julia Reichert, 76, documentarian (American Factory, Seeing Red, Union Maids), Oscar winner (2019) (b. 1946)
  - Andrew Speight, 58, Australian-born saxophonist (b. 1964)
- December 2
  - Walter Broadnax, 78, academic administrator and professor of politics (b. 1944)
  - Sam A. Crow, 96, jurist, judge of the U.S. District Court for the District of Kansas (since 1981) (b. 1926)
  - Phil Edmonston, 78, American-born Canadian consumer advocate and politician, MP (1990–1993) (b. 1944)
  - Jeffrey Friedman, 63, political scientist (Critical Review) (b. 1959)
  - Quentin Oliver Lee, 34, actor (The Phantom of the Opera) (b. 1988)
  - Jo Carol Pierce, 78, singer-songwriter and playwright (b. 1944)
  - Gaddis Smith, 90, historian and foreign policy expert (b. 1932)
  - Laila Storch, 101, oboist (b. 1921)
  - Al Strobel, 83, actor (Twin Peaks, Child of Darkness, Child of Light, Megaville) (b. 1939)
- December 3
  - Gordon Bradt, 98, art designer (b. 1924)
  - Kenneth O. Chilstrom, 101, air force colonel and test pilot (b. 1921)
  - Ursula Hayden, 56, professional wrestler (Gorgeous Ladies of Wrestling) and actress (b. 1966)
  - Sonny Holland, 84, football player and coach (Montana State) (b. 1938)
  - Janis Hunter, 66, music manager (b. 1957)
  - Jim Kolbe, 80, politician, member of the U.S. House of Representatives (1985–2007) and Arizona Senate (1977–1982) (b. 1942)
  - Bobby Naughton, 78, jazz vibraphonist and pianist (b. 1944)
  - Tony Waldrop, 70, middle-distance runner and academic administrator, president of the University of South Alabama (2014–2021) (b. 1951)
- December 4
  - June Blair, 89, model and actress (The Adventures of Ozzie and Harriet) (b. 1933)
  - Nick Bollettieri, 91, Hall of Fame tennis coach (b. 1931)
  - Bob McGrath, 90, actor (Sesame Street) (b. 1932)
  - Norman Pattiz, 79, broadcaster and business executive (Westwood One, Podcast One) (b. 1943)
  - Alex Sherzer, 51, chess grandmaster and physician (b. 1971)
  - Robert E. Tranquada, 92, physician and academic administrator (b. 1930)
- December 5
  - Kirstie Alley, 71, actress (Cheers, Veronica's Closet, Look Who's Talking) (b. 1951)
  - Jess Barr, 46, guitarist (Slobberbone) (b. 1976)
  - L. Patrick Engel, 90, politician, member of the Nebraska Legislature (1993–2009) (b. 1932)
  - Jay Goldberg, 89, lawyer and author (b. 1933)
  - John McGeever, 83, football player (Denver Broncos, Miami Dolphins) (b. 1939)
  - Terrence O'Hara, 76, television director (NCIS, Smallville, Grimm), (b. 1945)
  - Jim Stewart, 92, Hall of Fame record producer, co-founder of Stax Records (b. 1930)
- December 6
  - Hy Kloc, 75, German-born politician, member of the Idaho House of Representatives (2012–2018) (b. 1947)
  - Mills Lane, 85, boxing referee and television personality (Judge Mills Lane, Celebrity Deathmatch) (b. 1937)
  - David Lifton, 83, author (b. 1939)
- December 7
  - Roddy Jackson, 80, rockabilly singer, songwriter and pianist (b. 1942)
  - Helen Slayton-Hughes, 92, actress (Parks and Recreation, Crazy on the Outside, Moxie) (b. 1930)
  - Ronald Sherr, 70, painter (b. 1952)
  - Harry Yee, 104, bartender, inventor of the Blue Hawaii (b. 1918)
- December 8
  - Jean-Louis Bourgeois, 82, author (b. 1940)
  - Albert Brenner, 96, production designer (Bullitt, Beaches, Backdraft) (b. 1926)
  - Tom Flanigan, 88, baseball player (Chicago White Sox, St. Louis Cardinals) (b. 1934)
  - Lee Lorenz, 90, cartoonist and editor (The New Yorker) (b. 1932)
  - Richard Miller, 80, visual effects artist (Star Trek: First Contact, Who Framed Roger Rabbit, The Rocketeer) (b. 1942)
- December 9
  - Scott M. Bennett, 45, politician, member of the Illinois Senate (since 2015) (b. 1977)
  - Patricia Daly, 66, nun (b. 1956)
  - Herbert Deutsch, 90, composer, co-inventor of the Moog synthesizer (b. 1932)
  - Jonathan Goldberg, 79, literary theorist (b. 1943)
  - Joseph Kittinger, 94, United States Air Force officer and command pilot (Project Manhigh, Project Excelsior) (b. 1928)
  - Fredrick Terna, 99, Austrian-born painter and Holocaust survivor (b. 1923)
  - Jean-Nickolaus Tretter, 76, LGBTQ activist and archivist (b. 1946)
  - Milton Viorst, 92, journalist (The New Yorker) (b. 1930)
  - Wes Wise, 94, politician, mayor of Dallas (1971–1976) (b. 1928)
- December 10
  - John Aler, 73, lyric tenor (b. 1949)
  - J. J. Barnes, 79, R&B singer (b. 1943)
  - Dave Bolen, 98, Olympic sprinter (1948) and diplomat, ambassador to Botswana (1974–1976), Lesotho (1974–1976) and East Germany (1977–1980) (b. 1923)
  - Georgia Holt, 96, singer and actress (Watch the Birdie, Grounds for Marriage) (b. 1926)
  - Gabor Kalman, 92, Hungarian-born physicist (b. 1929)
  - Tony Lancaster, 84, British-born Bayesian econometrician (b. 1938)
  - Paul Silas, 79, basketball player (St. Louis/Atlanta Hawks, Boston Celtics) and coach (Charlotte Hornets) (b. 1943)
  - Grant Wahl, 48, sports journalist (b. 1974)
- December 11
  - Angelo Badalamenti, 85, film and television composer (Twin Peaks, Blue Velvet, Mulholland Drive) (b. 1937)
  - Ed Goorjian, 96, college basketball coach (Loyola Marymount) (b. 1926)
  - Frances Hesselbein, 107, management consultant, CEO of Girl Scouts of the USA (1976–1990) (b. 1915)
  - Neal Jimenez, 62, screenwriter (River's Edge, Hideaway) and film director (The Waterdance) (b. 1960)
  - Effie Kapsalis, 51, open access advocate (b. 1971)
  - Abigail Kinoiki Kekaulike Kawānanakoa, 96, Hawaiian royal heiress (b. 1926)
  - Joseph Kromelis, 75, street vendor (b. 1947)
  - Adrienne Mancia, 95, film curator (b. 1927)
- December 12
  - John Gregory, 84, football coach (Winnipeg Blue Bombers, Saskatchewan Roughriders, Iowa Barnstormers) (b. 1938)
  - Mike Leach, 61, college football coach (Mississippi State University, Texas Tech University, Washington State University) (b. 1961)
  - Stuart Margolin, 82, actor (The Rockford Files, Death Wish, Bret Maverick), Emmy winner (1979, 1980) (b. 1940)
  - Sheila Russell, 87, politician, mayor of Cambridge, Massachusetts (1996–1997) (b. 1935)
- December 13
  - Stephen Boss, 40, dancer and television personality (The Ellen DeGeneres Show, Disney's Fairy Tale Weddings, So You Think You Can Dance) (b. 1982)
  - Benjamin Bossi, 69, saxophonist (Romeo Void) (b. 1953)
  - Willard L. Boyd, 95, academic administrator, president of the University of Iowa (1969–1981) (b. 1927)
  - Ronnie R. Campbell, 68, politician, member of the Virginia House of Delegates (since 2019) (b. 1954)
  - Grand Daddy I.U., 54, rapper (b. 1968)
  - Jean Landis, 104, World War II aviator (Women Airforce Service Pilots) (b. 1918)
  - Frank Salemme, 89, mobster (Patriarca crime family) (b. 1933)
  - Curt Simmons, 93, baseball player (Philadelphia Phillies, St. Louis Cardinals, Chicago Cubs) (b. 1929)
  - Richard Wurtman, 86, neuroscientist (b. 1936)
- December 14
  - Bert Beverly Beach, 94, Swiss-born Adventist theologian (b. 1928)
  - Jean Franco, 98, British-born academic and literary critic (b. 1924)
  - Riccardo Giovanelli, 76, Italian-born astronomer (b. 1946)
  - John Hughes, 92, British-born journalist (The Christian Science Monitor, Deseret News), Pulitzer Prize winner (1967) (b. 1930)
  - Roch Kereszty, 89, Hungarian-born monk and scholar (b. 1933)
  - Charlene Mitchell, 92, labor and civil rights activist and politician (b. 1930)
  - Billie Moore, 79, Hall of Fame basketball coach (Cal State Fullerton Titans, UCLA Bruins, 1976 Olympic women's team) (b. 1943)
  - Cecil T. Sandifer, 99, politician, member of the South Carolina House of Representatives (1972–1980) (b. 1923)
  - Frank J. Shakespeare, 97, diplomat and media executive, ambassador to Portugal (1985–1986) and the Holy See (1987–1989) (b. 1925)
- December 15
  - Bertha Barbee-McNeal, 82, singer (The Velvelettes) (b. 1940)
  - Dino Danelli, 78, drummer (The Rascals) (b. 1944)
  - Walter J. Husak, 80, aerospace components manufacturer (b. 1942)
  - James J. Murakami, 91, art director and production designer (Deadwood, Changeling, Letters from Iwo Jima) (b. 1931)
  - Louis Orr, 64, basketball player (Indiana Pacers, New York Knicks), and coach (Seton Hall Pirates) (b. 1958)
- December 16
  - Rick Anderson, 75, rock bassist (The Tubes) (b. 1947)
  - Charlie Gracie, 86, rock singer ("Butterfly", "Fabulous") (b. 1936)
  - Sue Hardesty, 89, novelist (b. 1933)
  - Elliott H. Levitas, 91, politician, member of the U.S. House of Representatives (1975–1985) and the Georgia House of Representatives (1965–1975) (b. 1930)
- December 17
  - Drew Griffin, 60, newscaster (CNN) (b. 1962)
  - Elayne Jones, 94, timpanist (b. 1928)
  - P-22, 12, celebrity mountain lion (b. 2010)
  - Philip Pearlstein, 98, painter (b. 1924)
  - Clyde L. Reese, 64, jurist, judge of the Georgia Court of Appeals (since 2016) (b. 1958)
  - Christian Saulsberry, 25, football player (Edmonton Elks) (b. 1997)
- December 18
  - Stephanie Bissonnette, 32, dancer and choreographer (Mean Girls) (b. 1990)
  - Maggie Thrett, 76, (The Devil's Brigade, Three in the Attic, Star Trek) (b. 1946)
- December 19
  - H. Norman Abramson, 96, engineer and scientist (b. 1926)
  - Tom Browning, 62, baseball player (Cincinnati Reds, Kansas City Royals) (b. 1960)
  - Stanley Drucker, 93, clarinetist (b. 1929)
  - Sonya Eddy, 55, actress (General Hospital, Those Who Can't, Barbershop) (b. 1967)
  - Gary Knafelc, 90, football player (Green Bay Packers, San Francisco 49ers, Chicago Cardinals) (b. 1932)
  - Al Smith, 75, basketball player (Denver Rockets, Utah Stars) (b. 1947)
  - Steve Smoger, 72, Hall of Fame boxing referee (b. 1950)
- December 20
  - Charles Edwin Brown, 86, football player (Oakland Raiders) (b. 1936)
  - Denny Doyle, 78, baseball player (Philadelphia Phillies, Boston Red Sox, California Angels) (b. 1944)
  - Franco Harris, 72, Hall of Fame football player (Pittsburgh Steelers, Seattle Seahawks) (b. 1950)
  - Quinn Redeker, 86, actor (Days of Our Lives, The Young and the Restless) and screenwriter (The Deer Hunter) (b. 1936)
- December 21
  - Ron Hein, 73, politician, member of the Kansas Senate (1977–1985) and House of Representatives (1975–1977) (b. 1949)
  - Ronnie Hillman, 31, football player (Denver Broncos, Minnesota Vikings, San Diego Chargers) (b. 1991)
  - Harvey Jett, 73, guitarist (Black Oak Arkansas) (b. 1949)
  - Noreen Kokoruda, 75, politician, member of the Connecticut House of Representatives (2011–2021) (b. 1947)
  - Diane McBain, 81, actress (Spinout, Surfside 6, Batman) (b. 1941)
  - Gary Ridley, 77, engineer and politician, Oklahoma secretary of transportation (2009–2017) (b. 1945)
- December 22
  - Thom Bell, 79, Jamaican-born songwriter ("The Rubberband Man", "La-La (Means I Love You)", "Mama Can't Buy You Love"), arranger and record producer (b. 1943)
  - Big Scarr, 22, rapper (b. 2000)
  - Stephan Bonnar, 45, professional wrestler (UFC) (b. 1977)
  - Frank I. Marcus, 94, cardiologist (b. 1928) (death announced on this date)
  - Walter "Wolfman" Washington, 79, blues singer and guitarist (b. 1943)
- December 23
  - David Dalton, 88, violist and author (b. 1934)
  - Cotton Davidson, 91, football player (Baltimore Colts, Dallas Texans, Oakland Raiders) (b. 1931)
  - Jean-Robert de Cavel, 61, French-born chef (b. 1961)
  - Willie Sims, 64, American-born Israeli basketball player (Hapoel Tel Aviv, Elitzur Netanya, Maccabi Tel Aviv) (b. 1958)
  - Ed Updegraff, 100, golfer and urologist (b. 1922)
- December 24
  - Colleen House, 70, politician, member of the Michigan House of Representatives (1974–1976, 1983–1986) (b. 1952)
  - Demetrious Johnson, 61, football player (Detroit Lions, Miami Dolphins) (b. 1961)
  - Edie Landau, 95, film and television producer (Hopscotch, The Chosen, The Christmas Wife) and executive (b. 1927)
  - Freddie Roulette, 83, blues guitarist and singer (b. 1939)
  - John Howard Sanden, 87, portrait artist (b. 1935)
  - Larry Starcher, 80, jurist, member of the Supreme Court of Appeals of West Virginia (1997–2008) (b. 1942)
  - Kathy Whitworth, 83, Hall of Fame professional golfer (b. 1939)
- December 25
  - Luther "Guitar Junior" Johnson, 83, blues musician (b. 1939)
  - John H. McBryde, 91, jurist, judge of the U.S. District Court for Northern Texas (since 1990) (b. 1931)
  - Kevin Payne, 69, soccer executive (D.C. United, Toronto FC, United States Soccer Federation) (b. 1953)
  - Rita Walter, 71, actress (As the World Turns, The Secret Storm) (b. 1951)
- December 26
  - Dorothy Iannone, 89, visual artist (b. 1933)
  - Si Litvinoff, 93, film producer (Walkabout, The Queen, A Clockwork Orange) and lawyer (b. 1929)
  - Fred Valentine, 87, baseball player (Baltimore Orioles, Washington Senators) (b. 1935)
  - Gio Wiederhold, 86, Italian-born computer scientist (b. 1936)
- December 27
  - Arnie Ferrin, 97, basketball player (Utah Utes, Minneapolis Lakers) (b. 1925)
  - Alfred Goodwin, 99, jurist, judge of the U.S. Court of Appeals for the Ninth Circuit (since 1971) (b. 1923)
  - Thad Heartfield, 82, jurist, judge of the U.S. District Court for Eastern Texas (since 1995) (b. 1940)
  - Jo Mersa Marley, 31, Jamaica-born musician (b. 1991)
  - Stewart Albert Newblatt, 95, jurist, judge of the U.S. District Court for Eastern Michigan (since 1979) (b. 1927)
  - Peter Roussel, 81, political consultant (b. 1941)
  - Harry Sheppard, 94, jazz vibraphonist (b. 1928)
- December 28
  - Jess E. DuBois, 88, artist (b. 1934)
  - Dick Flavin, 86, poet (b. 1936)
  - Jaishankar Menon, 66, Indian-born computer scientist (b. 1956)
  - Harold Lloyd Murphy, 95, jurist, judge of the U.S. District Court for Northern Georgia (since 1977) (b. 1927)
  - Tony Vaccaro, 100, photographer (b. 1922)
  - Stefan Wever, 64, German-born baseball player (New York Yankees) (b. 1958)
- December 29
  - Keenan Cahill, 27, internet celebrity (b. 1995)
  - Dave Davis, 80, ten-pin bowler (b. 1942)
  - Norman A. Mordue, 80, jurist, judge of the United States District Court for the Northern District of New York (since 1998) (b. 1942)
  - Jaysin Strife, 37, professional wrestler (b. 1985)
- December 30
  - James Henderson Jr., 80, politician, member of the Arizona Senate (1985–1999) (b. 1942)
  - Uche Nwaneri, 38, football player (b. 1984)
  - Eric Thomas, 49, Olympic hurdler (b. 1973)
  - Barbara Walters, 93, television journalist (Today, 20/20) and talk show host (The View) (b. 1929)
  - John Quinn Weitzel, 94, Roman Catholic prelate, bishop of Samoa-Pago Pago (1986–2013) (b. 1928)
  - Don West, 59, wrestling broadcaster (Impact Wrestling) (b. 1963)
- December 31
  - Jeremiah Green, 45, indie rock drummer (Modest Mouse) (b. 1977)
  - Dori Monson, 61, radio host (b. 1961)
  - Anita Pointer, 74, singer (The Pointer Sisters) (b. 1948)
