= Deaths in October 2022 =

The following is a list of notable deaths in October 2022.

Entries for each day are listed alphabetically by surname. A typical entry lists information in the following sequence:

- Name, age, country of citizenship at birth, subsequent country of citizenship (if applicable), reason for notability, cause of death (if known), and reference.

== October 2022 ==
=== 1 ===
- Colin Alevras, 51, American restaurateur, glioblastoma.
- Marguerite Andersen, 97, German-born Canadian writer, poet, and educator.
- Neil Lawson Baker, 83, British artist.
- Kodiyeri Balakrishnan, 68, Indian politician, Kerala MLA (1982–1991, 2001–2016), pancreatic cancer.
- Beryl Benacerraf, 73, American radiologist, cancer.
- John Bloomfield, 89, Australian sports executive and scientist.
- William G. Borchert, 89, American screenwriter (My Name Is Bill W.).
- John Boxtel, 92, Dutch-Canadian sculptor and art teacher.
- Àngel Casas, 76, Spanish journalist, television talk show host and writer, calciphylaxis.
- Sam Doyle, 52, New Zealand rugby union player, leukemia.
- Kurt Fenske, 92, German economist and politician, member of the Volkskammer (1967–1990).
- Paul Harriss, 68, Australian politician, Tasmanian MHA (2014–2016) and MLC (1996–2014).
- Al Hoagland, 96, American computer engineer.
- Antonio Inoki, 79, Japanese Hall of Fame professional wrestler (NJPW), wrestling promoter, and politician, MP (1989–1995, 2013–2019), amyloidosis.
- George Katz, 96, American pianist.
- Toab Khan, 88, Bangladeshi journalist (Janakantha).
- Stamatis Kokotas, 85, Greek singer.
- Lorry I. Lokey, 95, American businessman and philanthropist, founder of Business Wire.
- Rosetta Loy, 91, Italian writer, cardiac arrest.
- Mardijo, 78, Indonesian politician.
- David O'Connor, 84, Australian-American Egyptologist.
- Lech Krzysztof Paprzycki, 75, Polish lawyer and politician, MP (1989–1991), acting first president of the Supreme Court (2014).
- Richard Pollock, 87, English linguist and translator.
- Raymond Strother, 81, American political consultant.
- Jim Sweeney, 60, American football player (New York Jets, Pittsburgh Steelers, Seattle Seahawks) and coach.
- Tulsi Tanti, 64, Indian renewable energy executive, founder of Suzlon, cardiac arrest.
- Osamu Watanabe, 81, Japanese wrestler, Olympic gold medallist (1964), heart attack.
- Constance Jordan Wilson, 71, American urban planner.
- Bruce E. Young, 76, American politician.
- Kay Zinck, 61, Canadian curler.

=== 2 ===
- Raymond Allen, 82, British television screenwriter (Some Mothers Do 'Ave 'Em, Comedy Playhouse, The Little and Large Show) and playwright, cancer.
- David Beckwith, 79, American journalist, lung cancer.
- Jim Carter, 103, New Zealand musician.
- Tyrone Davis, 50, American football player (Green Bay Packers, New York Jets).
- Thomas J. Devlin, 87, American experimental physicist, kidney disease and congestive heart failure.
- Darshan Dharmaraj, 41, Sri Lankan actor (Prabhakaran, Ini Avan, Address Na), heart attack.
- Bjarne Mørk Eidem, 85, Norwegian politician, MP (1969–1993), minister of fisheries (1986–1989) and auditor general (1990–2005).
- Shirley Englehorn, 81, American golfer.
- Pietro Fabris, 87, Italian politician, senator (1987–1996).
- Wolfgang Haken, 94, German-American mathematician.
- Chris Harris, 89, English-born American basketball player (St. Louis Hawks).
- Éder Jofre, 86, Brazilian Hall of Fame boxer, world bantamweight (1960–1965) and WBC featherweight (1973–1974) champion, complications from pneumonia.
- Jeff Jordan, 78, American football player (Minnesota Vikings).
- Douglas Kirkland, 88, Canadian-American photographer.
- Vladimir Kuts, 94, Russian World War II veteran.
- Sacheen Littlefeather, 75, American civil rights activist and actress (Johnny Firecloud, Winterhawk, Counselor at Crime), breast cancer.
- Jean-Pierre Machelon, 77, French academic and jurist.
- Eamonn McCabe, 74, British photographer.
- Mary McCaslin, 75, American folk singer-songwriter, progressive supranuclear palsy.
- Dennis Nyback, 69, American independent film archivist and filmmaker, cancer.
- Allan Porter, 88, American-Swiss photographer and magazine editor (Camera).
- Atlas Ramachandran, 80, Indian jeweller, film producer (Vaisali, Sukrutham) and actor.
- Jim Redmond, 81, Trinidadian-British engineer.
- François Remetter, 94, French footballer (Strasbourg, Metz, national team).
- Larry Sather, 81, American politician, member of the Pennsylvania House of Representatives (1993–2006).
- Annie Shekhar, 84, Indian politician, Maharashtra MLA (2004–2014).
- John Shinners, 75, American football player (Cincinnati Bengals, New Orleans Saints, Baltimore Colts).
- Laurence Silberman, 86, American jurist, judge of the U.S. Court of Appeals for the District of Columbia (since 1985).
- André Sinédo, 44, New Caledonian footballer (AS Magenta, national team).
- Béla Szakcsi Lakatos, 79, Hungarian pianist and composer.
- Carl Walker, 88, British police inspector.
- Bill Whitaker, 63, American football player (Green Bay Packers, St. Louis Cardinals).
- Camille Ziade, 79, Lebanese politician, MP (1992–2000).

=== 3 ===
- Aïda Ba, 39, French rugby union player (national team), breast cancer.
- Ekow Blankson, 50, Ghanaian actor (Checkmate, Sun City).
- Per Bredesen, 91, Norwegian footballer (Lazio, Ørn Horten, national team).
- Barbara Brennan, 83, American author and spiritual healer.
- Bill Brewster, 80, American politician, member of the U.S. House of Representatives (1991–1997) and Oklahoma House of Representatives (1983–1990).
- Nancy B. Firestone, 70, American jurist, judge of the U.S. Court of Federal Claims (since 1998).
- Peter Forman, 88, English cricketer (Nottinghamshire).
- Ron Franz, 76, American basketball player (Oakland Oaks, New Orleans Buccaneers, The Floridians).
- Charles Fuller, 83, American playwright (A Soldier's Play, Zooman and the Sign), Pulitzer winner (1982).
- Rebecca Godfrey, 54, Canadian novelist and non-fiction writer, lung cancer.
- Simon Hallenbarter, 43, Swiss Olympic biathlete (2006, 2010), suicide.
- Ian Hamilton, 97, Scottish lawyer and independence activist (1950 removal of the Stone of Scone).
- David Huerta, 72, Mexican poet, kidney failure.
- Tiffany Jackson, 37, American basketball player (New York Liberty, Tulsa Shock, Los Angeles Sparks) and coach, cancer.
- Kim Jung Gi, 47, South Korean illustrator and comics artist, heart attack.
- Johann Müllner, 90, Austrian farmer and politician.
- Al Neiger, 83, American baseball player (Philadelphia Phillies).
- Jesús Quintero, 82, Spanish journalist, respiratory failure.
- Pandurang Raut, 76, Indian politician, Goa MLA (1989–1994, 1999–2002).
- Fabián Ríos, 58, Argentine politician, senator (2003–2009) and deputy (2011–2013), heart failure.
- George Saurman, 96, American politician, member of the Pennsylvania House of Representatives (1981–1994).
- Léonie Sazias, 65, Dutch television presenter and politician, MP (2017–2021), colon cancer.
- Nicolas Tikhobrazoff, 76, French painter and radio host.
- Howard Tripp, 95, British Roman Catholic prelate, titular bishop of Newport and auxiliary bishop of Southwark (1980–2004).
- Helge Törn, 93, Finnish Olympic cyclist (1952).
- Jerzy Urban, 89, Polish journalist (Polityka, Nie) and writer.
- František Vršovský, 89, Czech Olympic sprint canoeist.
- Wang Hongfan, 89, Chinese politician, member of the National People's Congress (1993–1998).
- Florin Zalomir, 41, Romanian fencer, Olympic silver medallist (2012).

=== 4 ===
- Philippe Ascher, 86, French neuroscientist.
- Pat Baker, 83, Canadian lacrosse player, complications from COVID-19.
- John Brady, 90, Australian footballer.
- Walter Dean Burnham, 92, American political scientist and author (Presidential Ballots, 1836–1892).
- Viktor Donskikh, 87, Russian politician, deputy (1991–1993).
- Dave Dryden, 81, Canadian ice hockey player (New York Rangers, Chicago Blackhawks, Buffalo Sabres).
- Jean Gallois, 93, French musicologist.
- Shekhar Joshi, 90, Indian author.
- Kim Dong-gil, 94, South Korean poet and politician, MNA (1992–1996).
- Felicitas Kuhn, 96, Austrian children's book illustrator.
- Günter Lamprecht, 92, German actor (Berlin Alexanderplatz, Das Boot, World on a Wire).
- Loretta Lynn, 90, American Hall of Fame country singer-songwriter ("Coal Miner's Daughter", "You Ain't Woman Enough (To Take My Man)", "The Pill"), Grammy winner (1972, 2004, 2010).
- Gordon Beattie Martin, 90, Canadian sportscaster and politician, Saskatchewan MLA (1986–1991).
- César Mascetti, 80, Argentine journalist and television news host (Telenoche).
- Sergio Mims, 67, American film critic and historian, complications from colon cancer.
- Eleanor Moore, 88, American baseball player (Fort Wayne Daisies, Grand Rapids Chicks), complications from pneumonia.
- Jesús del Muro, 84, Mexican football player (Atlas, national team) and manager (Jalisco).
- Kaori O'Connor, 77, American social anthropologist.
- Stott Parker, 69, American computer scientist.
- Peter Robinson, 72, British-born Canadian crime writer (Inspector Alan Banks).
- Lucienne Schmidt-Couttet, 95, French Olympic alpine skier (1948).
- Jürgen Sundermann, 82, German football player (FC Basel, West Germany national team) and manager (VfB Stuttgart).
- Dan Sullivan, 86, British theatre critic.
- Shigeki Tanaka, 91, Japanese runner.
- Janet Thurlow, 96, American jazz singer, heart failure.
- Jerry Vainisi, 80, American football executive (Chicago Bears).
- Adam Walker, 31, Scottish rugby league player (Hull Kingston Rovers, Wakefield Trinity, national team), suicide.
- Liam Ward, 92, Irish jockey.
- Zhang Qiusheng, 83, Chinese children's book writer.

=== 5 ===
- Tommy Boggs, 66, American baseball player (Atlanta Braves, Texas Rangers) and coach Concordia University Texas, cancer.
- Gabriela Cárdeñas, 64, Peruvian Olympic volleyball player.
- Robert Henry Doolan, 105, American fighter pilot.
- Murray Dubbin, 93, American politician.
- Alejandra González Pino, 54, Chilean politician, heart failure.
- Wolfgang Kohlhaase, 91, German screenwriter (I Was Nineteen, Mama, I'm Alive) and film director (Solo Sunny).
- Hans Lagerwall, 81, Swedish Olympic fencer (1960, 1964).
- Sara Lee, 30, American professional wrestler (WWE) and television personality (WWE Tough Enough), suicide by drug overdose.
- Harry Lehman, 87, American politician, member of the Ohio House of Representatives (1971–1980).
- Lenny Lipton, 82, American poet and lyricist ("Puff, the Magic Dragon"), brain cancer.
- Sulejman Maliqati, 94, Albanian footballer (Besa, Partizani, national team).
- Bernard McGuirk, 64, American radio personality, brain cancer.
- Stella G. Mew, 80, Irish educator.
- Ann-Christine Nyström, 78, Finnish singer.
- Michael Papps, 90, Australian Olympic sport shooter (1960, 1964).
- Barbara Stamm, 77, German politician, member (1976–2018) and president (2008–2018) of the Landtag of Bavaria.

=== 6 ===
- Araz Alizadeh, 70, Azerbaijani politician, people's deputy (1991–1995).
- Tekeste Baire, 69, Eritrean trade union activist (NCEW).
- Hans Berger, 84, German trade unionist and politician, MP (1990–1994), president of the Union of Mining and Energy (1990–1997).
- Hans-Jürgen Bode, 81, German Olympic handball player.
- Adriana Breukink, 65, Dutch recorder player and maker.
- Carl Fredrik Bunæs, 82, Norwegian Olympic sprinter (1960).
- Fred Catero, 89, American record producer and engineer.
- Husnija Fazlić, 79, Bosnian football player (1. FC Saarbrücken, Borac Banja Luka) and manager (SD Croatia Berlin).
- John-Erik Franzén, 80, Swedish artist and painter.
- Michel Herjean, 78, French trade unionist and Breton separatist.
- Ivy Jo Hunter, 82, American songwriter ("Behind a Painted Smile", "Loving You Is Sweeter Than Ever", "Dancing in the Street").
- Noé Jitrik, 94, Argentine literary critic, stroke.
- Jorge Lugo, 84, Venezuelan Olympic judoka.
- Engelbert Lulla, 93, Austrian Olympic sprint canoer.
- Jody Miller, 80, American country singer ("Queen of the House"), Grammy winner (1966), complications from Parkinson's disease.
- Gordon Mydland, 100, American politician, attorney general of South Dakota (1969–1973) and member of South Dakota Senate (1963–1968).
- Vincent Eze Ogbulafor, 73, Nigerian politician.
- Mary Ogg, 77, New Zealand politician, mayor of Gore (1995–2001).
- Roy Radner, 95, American economist.
- Phil Read, 83, English motorcycle racer, seven-time F.I.M. Road Racing champion.
- Kenneth M. Sayre, 94, American philosopher.
- Andreas Schnieders, 55, German Olympic boxer (1988).
- Stanley Tarshis, 84, American gymnast.
- Judy Tenuta, 72, American comedian, actress (The Weird Al Show, Going Down in LA-LA Land, There's No Such Thing as Vampires), and musician, ovarian cancer.
- Pierre Thollot, 89, American electrical engineer.
- Ankica Tuđman, 96, Croatian presidential consort.
- Gian Piero Ventrone, 62, Italian football fitness coach (Juventus, Tottenham Hotspur, national team), acute myeloid leukemia.
- Günter Vetter, 86, Austrian politician.

=== 7 ===
- Warren J. Baker, 84, American academic administrator, president of Cal Poly San Luis Obispo (1979–2010).
- Arun Bali, 79, Indian actor (Chanakya, Swabhimaan, Hey Ram).
- Leon Burton, 87, American football player (Arizona State Sun Devils, New York Titans).
- William Sheldrick Conover, 94, American politician, member of the U.S. House of Representatives (1972–1973).
- Ronnie Cuber, 80, American jazz saxophonist.
- Ada Fisher, 74, American physician and politician.
- Ann Flood, 89, American actress (The Edge of Night, From These Roots, Mystic Pizza).
- Fernando González Gortázar, 79, Mexican architect, sculptor and writer.
- Paul-Mounged El-Hachem, 88, Lebanese Maronite Catholic prelate, eparch of Baalbek-Deir El Ahmar (1995–2005).
- Horst Hülß, 84, German football player (Viktoria Köln, 1. FSV Mainz 05) and manager (SV Wiesbaden).
- Toshi Ichiyanagi, 89, Japanese composer and pianist.
- Avtar Singh Jouhl, 84, Indian-born British anti-racism campaigner and lecturer.
- Art Laboe, 97, American disc jockey (KXLA, KPOP), founder of Original Sound Records, pneumonia.
- Brenda MacGibbon, 78, Canadian mathematician and statistician, complications from Alzheimer's disease and ALS.
- Susanna Mildonian, 82, Belgian harpist.
- Shoshana Netanyahu, 99, Israeli lawyer, justice of the Supreme Court (1981–1993).
- Bill Nieder, 89, American shot putter, Olympic champion (1960).
- Toru Ohno, 87, Japanese literary scholar.
- Robert Pennywell, 67, American football player (Atlanta Falcons, Michigan Panthers).
- Al Ries, 95, American marketing professional and author.
- Cheryl Roberts, 60, South African Olympic table tennis player (1992), cancer.
- Jure Robežnik, 89, Slovenian pianist and composer.
- Austin Stoker, 92, Trinidadian-American actor (Assault on Precinct 13, Battle for the Planet of the Apes, Abby), kidney failure.
- Sergio Tagliapietra, 87, Italian Olympic rower (1956, 1964).
- Robert I. Toll, 81, American homebuilder, co-founder of Toll Brothers, complications from Parkinson's disease.
- Anna Wahlgren, 80, Swedish author.
- Zita Leeson Weinshienk, 89, American jurist, judge of the U.S. District Court of Colorado (1979–2011).
- Ivan Wolffers, 74, Dutch writer and physician, prostate cancer.

=== 8 ===
- Manuel Aguilera Gómez, 86, Mexican economist and politician, senator (1991–1993).
- Martine Allain-Regnault, 85, French scientific journalist.
- Brígida Baltar, 62, Brazilian visual artist, leukemia.
- Gabrielle Beaumont, 80, British television director (Diana: A Tribute to the People's Princess, Star Trek: The Next Generation, Remington Steele).
- Richard Bender, 92, American architect.
- Billy Al Bengston, 88, American visual artist and sculptor.
- Bob Berry, 92, American government official.
- Chuck Bradley, 71, American football player (San Diego Chargers, Miami Dolphins, Chicago Bears).
- Charlie Brown, 80, American DJ (WKIX) and radio presenter.
- André Chagnon, 94, Canadian telecommunications executive and philanthropist, founder of Vidéotron.
- William Chepkut, Kenyan politician, MP (2017–2022).
- Ogunlade Davidson, 73, Sierra Leonean scientist.
- John Duncan, 73, Scottish football player (Dundee, Tottenham Hotspur) and manager (Chesterfield).
- Ron Gassert, 82, American football player (Green Bay Packers).
- Grace Glueck, 96, American arts journalist (The New York Times, The New Criterion, Los Angeles Review of Books).
- Julian Hammond, 79, American basketball player (Denver Rockets).
- Val Joyce, 91, Irish radio broadcaster.
- Gerben Karstens, 80, Dutch racing cyclist, Olympic champion (1964), complications from a stroke.
- Faustino López Vargas, 64, Mexican politician, senator (since 2022), traffic collision.
- Joseph M. Magone, 99, American politician.
- Esther Peter-Davis, 90, French human rights activist and environmentalist.
- Iain Rice, 74, British model railway enthusiast and writer.
- Luis Sáinz Hinojosa, 86, Bolivian Roman Catholic prelate, auxiliary bishop of Cochabamba (1982–1987, 2001–2012) and archbishop of La Paz (1987–1996).
- Ann Savours Shirley, 94, British polar exploration historian.
- Albert Solà, 66, Spanish waiter and self-proclaimed illegitimate son of King Juan Carlos I.
- Peter Tobin, 76, Scottish serial killer and rapist.
- Angus Trumble, 58, Australian art curator and historian, director of the National Portrait Gallery of Australia (2014–2018).
- Meike de Vlas, 80, Dutch rower, European championships silver medallist (1964), cancer.
- Harold Wippler, 94, American violinist.
- Cliff Wright, 77, English footballer (Hartlepools United, Boston United, Darlington).
- Frank Youso, 86, American football player (New York Giants, Minnesota Vikings, Oakland Raiders).

=== 9 ===
- Temsüla Ao, 76, Indian poet and writer (Laburnum For My Head).
- Leszek Tadeusz Biały, 82, Polish politician and teacher, deputy (1991–1993).
- Samarjit Roy Chowdhury, 85, Bangladeshi painter.
- Ted Crosbie, 91, Irish businessman and newspaper publisher.
- Andrés Cuervo, 34, Colombian singer-songwriter.
- Chuck Deardorf, 68, American jazz musician, COVID-19.
- Yuriy Dehteryov, 74, Ukrainian footballer (Shakhtar Donetsk, Soviet Union national team).
- Tony DeLuca, 85, American politician, member of the Pennsylvania House of Representatives (since 1983), lymphoma.
- Nikki Finke, 68, American blogger and entertainment journalist, founder of Deadline Hollywood.
- Alastair Fowler, 92, Scottish literary critic and editor.
- Doug Langway, 52, American screenwriter and film director (BearCity), liver cancer.
- Bruno Latour, 75, French philosopher and sociologist (Laboratory Life, Science in Action, We Have Never Been Modern), pancreatic cancer.
- Cees Lute, 81, Dutch racing cyclist.
- William March, 85, American Olympic weightlifter.
- Margie Masters, 87, Australian professional golfer.
- Mickey Micelotta, 93, American baseball player (Philadelphia Phillies).
- Bruce Pairaudeau, 91, Guyanese-New Zealand cricketer (British Guyana, Northern Districts, West Indies).
- Eileen Ryan, 94, American actress (Magnolia, Parenthood, Benny & Joon).
- Bhanwar Lal Sharma, 77, Indian politician, Rajasthan MLA (1985–1993, 1996–2008, since 2013).
- Josep Soler, 87, Spanish composer, writer, and music theorist.
- Wendy Smits, 39, Dutch handball player (TuS Metzingen, HSG Blomberg-Lippe, national team).
- Jack Thiessen, 91, Canadian lexicographer.
- Kevin Thomas, 78, English footballer (Blackpool, Tranmere Rovers, Southport), stroke.
- Mike Thompson, 73, American baseball player (St. Louis Cardinals, Atlanta Braves, Washington Senators).
- Susan Tolsky, 79, American actress (Madame's Place, Here Come the Brides, Darkwing Duck).

=== 10 ===
- Subbu Arumugam, 94, Indian writer and storyteller.
- Emeric Arus, 84, Romanian Olympic fencer (1960).
- Roberto Bisacco, 83, Italian actor (Torso, Detective Belli, Romeo and Juliet).
- Darnley Boxill, 78, Barbadian cricketer.
- Sergio Brighenti, 90, Italian football player (Inter Milan, Sampdoria, national team) and manager, heart attack.
- Michael Callan, 86, American actor (West Side Story, Cat Ballou, Gidget Goes Hawaiian), pneumonia.
- Alejandro Santiago Ciena, 44, Puerto Rican music video director.
- Kenny Clayton, 86, British record producer, arranger and conductor.
- Keith Eddy, 77, English footballer (Watford, Barrow, Sheffield United).
- Dick Ellsworth, 82, American baseball player (Chicago Cubs, Boston Red Sox, Cleveland Indians).
- Ferdinando Facchiano, 95, Italian lawyer and politician, deputy (1987–1994), minister for cultural and environmental heritage (1989–1991).
- Sterling Johnson Jr., 88, American jurist, judge of the U.S. District Court of Eastern New York (since 1991).
- Anita Kerr, 94, American singer, Grammy winner (1966, 1967).
- Viktor Logunov, 78, Russian track cyclist, Olympic silver medalist (1964).
- Fred Martin, 95, American artist.
- Jim Niekamp, 76, American ice hockey player (Detroit Red Wings).
- Roman Pelts, 85, Ukrainian-Canadian chess master.
- Joe Roberts, 86, American basketball player (Ohio State Buckeyes, Syracuse Nationals, Kentucky Colonels) and coach.
- Paavo Roininen, 87, Finnish Olympic boxer (1960).
- Leon Schidlowsky, 91, Chilean-Israeli composer.
- Allan Wood, 79, Australian swimmer, Olympic bronze medallist (1964), cancer.
- James Wright, 83, American historian, president of Dartmouth College (1998–2009).
- Mulayam Singh Yadav, 82, Indian politician, minister of defence (1996–1998), MP (1996–2004, since 2009) and three-time chief minister of Uttar Pradesh.

=== 11 ===
- Doru Ana, 68, Romanian actor (The Man of the Day, Next Stop Paradise, Stuff and Dough).
- Frøydis Armand, 73, Norwegian actress (Wives – Ten Years After, Hotel Cæsar).
- Marion Boyd, 76, Canadian politician, Ontario MPP (1990–1999).
- André Brassard, 76, Canadian film (Once Upon a Time in the East, The Late Blossom) and theatre director.
- Peter Butler, 90, English golfer.
- Jaroslav Čejka, 86, Czech dancer, mime, and actor.
- Rick Cessar, 93, American politician, member of the Pennsylvania House of Representatives (1971–1994), heart failure.
- Herbert Chabot, 91, American jurist, judge of the United States Tax Court (1978–2016), complications from COVID-19.
- Joe Crozier, 93, Canadian ice hockey player (Toronto Maple Leafs) and coach (Buffalo Sabres, Rochester Americans).
- Louis Denis, 94, Canadian ice hockey player (Montreal Canadiens).
- Joan Fear, 90, New Zealand painter.
- Harold Garde, 99, American painter.
- Janice Gates, 57, American yoga instructor and therapist.
- Beryl Goldwyn, 91, English ballet dancer, breast cancer.
- A. Gopalakrishnan, 85, Indian nuclear engineer.
- François Iselin, 82, Swiss architect and writer.
- Dame Angela Lansbury, 96, British-American-Irish actress (The Manchurian Candidate, Sweeney Todd, Murder, She Wrote) and singer, five-time Tony winner.
- Gerard Lautenschutz, 93, Dutch Olympic sailor.
- Hikaru Matsunaga, 93, Japanese politician, minister of finance (1998), international trade (1989–1990) and education (1984–1985).
- Jean-Louis Pelletier, 86, French criminal lawyer.
- Sheikh Anne Rahman, 62, Bangladeshi politician, MP (since 2018).
- Reza Roosta Azad, 60, Iranian academic, chancellor of Sharif University of Technology (2010–2014).
- Altaf Ahmad Shah, 66, Indian Kashmiri separatist, renal cancer.
- Charles Sherrod, 85, American civil rights activist.
- Willie Spence, 23, American singer (American Idol), traffic collision.
- Victor Steeman, 22, Dutch motorcycle racer, injuries sustained in race collision.

=== 12 ===
- Bernardo Adam Ferrero, 80, Spanish composer, conductor and musicologist.
- Jim Bailey, 87, American baseball player (Cincinnati Reds).
- Linos Benakis, 94, Greek historian of philosophy.
- Nigel Boddice, 70, British trumpeter and conductor.
- Manoel Victor Cavalcante, 63, Brazilian politician, Santa Catarina MLA (1991–1995).
- Jacques Cresta, 67, French politician, deputy (2012–2017).
- James M. Derham, 74, American diplomat.
- George Forbes, 78, Scottish businessman, chairman of Newcastle United.
- Peter Gumpel, 98, German Jesuit priest and historian.
- Ron Hendren, 77, American journalist and television personality (Entertainment Tonight).
- Lucious Jackson, 80, American basketball player (Philadelphia 76ers, national team), Olympic champion (1964), heart failure.
- Katsuya Kitamura, 36, Japanese professional wrestler (NJPW), bodybuilder, and mixed martial artist, heart failure.
- N. Kovaithangam, 73, Indian politician, Tamil Nadu MLA (2001–2011).
- Konstantin Landa, 50, Russian chess grandmaster.
- Gary A. Lee, 89, American politician, member of the U.S. House of Representatives (1979–1983) and New York State Assembly (1975–1979).
- Ngo Vinh Long, 78, Vietnamese-American historian.
- Mary Adelia McLeod, 84, American Episcopal bishop, bishop of Vermont (1993–2001).
- Billy Newman, 75, Irish footballer (Shelbourne, national team).
- Ralph Pearson, 103, American chemist (HSAB theory).
- Osmo Pekonen, 62, Finnish mathematician, science historian and writer.
- Nikolay Petrunin, 46, Russian politician, deputy (since 2016), COVID-19.
- Karen Poniachik, 57, Chilean journalist and politician, minister of mining (2006–2008).
- Dariusz Raczyński, 60, Polish footballer (Lechia Gdańsk).
- Jeremy Rogers, 85, British boat builder and sailor, complications of Alzheimer's disease and COVID-19.
- Dolores Sloviter, 90, American jurist, judge of the U.S. Court of Appeals for the Third Circuit (since 1979).
- Walter Steinegger, 93, Austrian Olympic ski jumper.
- Robert West, 94, American chemist.

=== 13 ===
- Frasat Ali, 73, Pakistani-Kenyan cricketer (national team).
- Jeff Barnaby, 46, Canadian film director (Rhymes for Young Ghouls, Blood Quantum), cancer.
- Doug Brignole, 63, American bodybuilder, COVID-19.
- Jon Brittenum, 78, American football player (Arkansas Razorbacks, San Diego Chargers).
- Ding Wenchang, 89, Chinese air force officer.
- Fuzzy, 83, Danish composer (Eight Hours Don't Make a Day).
- Verckys Kiamuangana Mateta, 78, Congolese saxophonist and composer.
- James McDivitt, 93, American astronaut (Gemini 4, Apollo 9).
- Mohamed Latiff Mohamed, 72, Singaporean poet and writer.
- Pim van de Meent, 84, Dutch football player (DOS) and coach (De Graafschap, NEC Nijmegen).
- Halvor Næs, 94, Norwegian Olympic ski jumper (1952, 1960).
- Jan Rabson, 68, American voice actor (Akira, Leisure Suit Larry, James Bond Jr.), heart attack.
- Dagmar Rom, 94, Austrian skier, Olympic silver medallist (1952).
- Carl Ryves, 82, Australian Olympic sailor.
- Stavros Sarafis, 72, Greek football player (PAOK, national team) and manager, stroke.
- Moe Savransky, 93, American baseball player (Cincinnati Redlegs).
- Mike Schank, 53, American musician and actor (American Movie, Storytelling, Hamlet A.D.D.), cancer.
- Rollie Seltz, 98, American basketball player (Anderson Packers, Waterloo Hawks, Saint Paul Lights).
- Joyce Sims, 63, American R&B singer-songwriter ("Come Into My Life").
- Lennart Söderberg, 81, Swedish football player (AIK) and manager (Gefle, Västerås).
- John Spender, 86, Australian politician and diplomat, MP (1980–1990) and ambassador to France (1996–2000).
- Ben Stevens, 63, American politician, member (2001–2007) and president (2005–2007) of the Alaska Senate.
- Elizabeth Stewart, 83, Scottish singer.
- Bruce Sutter, 69, American Hall of Fame baseball player (Chicago Cubs, St. Louis Cardinals, Atlanta Braves), cancer.

=== 14 ===
- Zhaneta Andrea, 85, Albanian archeologist.
- Raymond Argentin, 97, French Olympic sprint canoeist (1948).
- Alfredo Chiappori, 79, Italian cartoonist.
- Adam Clapham, 82, British television director and producer (Doomsday Gun).
- Robbie Coltrane, 72, Scottish actor (Harry Potter, Cracker, GoldenEye) and comedian, multiple organ failure.
- Eric Crone, 75, Danish film producer.
- Dieter Dieckhoff, 93, German farmer and politician, member of the Landtag of Lower Saxony (1974–1990).
- Ross Fichtner, 83, American football player (Cleveland Browns, New Orleans Saints), complications from Parkinson's disease.
- Étienne Gaboury, 92, Canadian architect (Precious Blood Roman Catholic Church, Saint Boniface Cathedral, Esplanade Riel).
- Jan van der Graaf, 85, Dutch church administrator, general secretary of the Reformed Association in the Protestant Church in the Netherlands (1973–2001).
- Alan Halsey, 73, British poet.
- Abu al-Hasan al-Hashimi al-Qurashi, Iraqi Islamic militant, caliph of the Islamic State (since 2022), shot.
- Yoshiki Hiki, 89, Japanese Olympic rower (1956).
- George Johanson, 94, American painter, printmaker, and ceramic tile artist.
- Colette Kreder, 88, French engineer, creator of Demain la Parité network & Femmes et sciences.
- Feliks W. Kres, 56, Polish writer.
- Stanislav Kropilák, 67, Slovak Hall of Fame basketball player (Inter Bratislava, BK Pardubice, CEP Fleurus).
- Gerrit van der Linde, 95, Dutch jurist, justice of the Supreme Court (1981–1997).
- Muhammad Noor Meskanzai, 66, Pakistani jurist, chief justice of the Balochistan High Court (2014–2018) and the Federal Shariat Court (since 2021), shot.
- Mariana Nicolesco, 73, Romanian operatic soprano.
- Alexandros Nikolaidis, 42, Greek taekwondo athlete, Olympic silver medalist (2004, 2008), cancer.
- Timothy O'Brien, 93, British theatre designer, prostate cancer.
- Ed Olivares, 84, Puerto Rican baseball player (St. Louis Cardinals).
- Kay Parker, 78, British pornographic actress (Sex World, Dracula Sucks, Taboo), cancer.
- Kedar Singh Phonia, 92, Indian politician, Uttar Pradesh (1991–2002) and Uttarakhand (2007–2012) MLA.
- N. U. Prabhu, 98, Indian-American mathematician.
- Ljubisav Rakić, 91, Serbian neurobiologist and academic.
- Preben Rudiengaard, 78, Danish physician and politician, MP (1998–2011).
- Georg Scholz, 64, German medical officer and politician, member of the Landtag of North Rhine-Westphalia (2000–2005).
- André Spénard, 72, Canadian politician, Quebec MNA (2012–2018).
- Steve Trotter, 61, American daredevil.
- Roberto Vencato, 70, Italian Olympic sailor (1976).
- Julien Vrebos, 75, Belgian film director.
- Ted White, 96, American stuntman (Escape from New York, Road House) and actor (Friday the 13th: The Final Chapter).
- Ralf Wolter, 95, German actor (One, Two, Three, Cabaret, What Is the Matter with Willi?).

=== 15 ===
- Milton Cabral, 101, Brazilian engineer and politician, deputy (1964–1971), two-time senator, governor of Paraíba (1986–1987).
- Charley Cobb, 92, American football coach.
- Noel Duggan, 73, Irish musician (Clannad, The Duggans).
- Anne Edwards, 87, Canadian politician.
- Billur Kalkavan, 59, Turkish actress (The Blue Exile, The Queen Is in the Factory, Acayip Hikayeler), lung cancer.
- Ken Kortas, 80, American football player (Pittsburgh Steelers).
- Sylvia Laughter, 63, American politician, member of the Arizona House of Representatives (1999–2005), complications from COVID-19.
- Jay Owen Light, 81, American academic administrator.
- Cyrus Mann, 66, American basketball player (Crispa Redmanizers), COVID-19.
- Horst Metz, 77, German politician, member of the Landtag of Saxony (1990–2009).
- Mikaben, 41, Haitian singer, songwriter, and producer, cardiac arrest.
- K. Murari, 78, Indian film producer (Seetamalakshmi, Seetharama Kalyanam, Srinivasa Kalyanam).
- Tullio Pozzan, 73, Italian biochemist.
- William H. Rowden, 92, American vice admiral.
- Simon Roy, 54, Canadian author, brain cancer.
- Marty Sammon, 45, American blues pianist (Buddy Guy).
- O. P. Sharma, 80, Indian magician.
- Thomas Sleeper, 66, American composer and conductor, complications from amyotrophic lateral sclerosis.

=== 16 ===
- Doris Margaret Anderson, 100, Canadian politician, senator (1995–1997).
- Jüri Arrak, 85, Estonian painter.
- Joyce Aylard, 97, British codebreaker.
- Vidmantas Bačiulis, 82, Lithuanian screenwriter and film director.
- Lodewijk van den Berg, 90, Dutch-born American chemical engineer and astronaut (STS-51-B).
- Joan Liffring-Zug Bourret, 93, American photographer and civil rights activist.
- Benjamin Civiletti, 87, American lawyer, attorney general (1979–1981) and deputy attorney general (1978–1979), complications from Parkinson's disease.
- Katherine Duncan-Jones, 81, British literature and Shakespeare scholar, complications of dementia.
- Malcolm Patrick Galt, 93, Trinidadian Roman Catholic prelate, bishop of Bridgetown (1995–2005).
- Satya Mohan Joshi, 102, Nepali literary scholar (Hamro Lok Sanskriti).
- Yūko Katagiri, 70, Japanese actress (Gassan), bile duct cancer.
- Lee Yong-hui, 91, South Korean politician, MNA (1973–1980, 1985–1988, 2004–2012).
- Dilip Mahalanabis, 87, Indian pediatrician.
- Manoj Singh Mandavi, 58, Indian politician, Chhattisgarh MLA (since 2013), heart attack.
- Robert McKinley, 94, Canadian politician, MP (1965–1980).
- Hans Michalsky, 73, German Olympic cyclist.
- Helen Michaluk, 92, Belarusian activist, chair of the Association of Belarusians in Great Britain (1997–2013).
- Paulo Henrique Paes Landim, 84, Brazilian doctor and politician, Piauí MLA (1991–2007).
- Josef Somr, 88, Czech actor (Closely Watched Trains, The Joke, How the World Is Losing Poets).
- Ronald Stedman, 95, British Olympic swimmer (1948).
- Margaret Sumner, 81, Australian lawn bowler.
- Vaishali Takkar, 30, Indian actress (Sasural Simar Ka, Super Sisters - Chalega Pyar Ka Jaadu, Vish Ya Amrit: Sitara), suicide by hanging.
- Ian Whittaker, 94, British set decorator (Alien, Howards End) and actor (The Revenge of Frankenstein), Oscar winner (1993), prostate cancer.
- Josef Zemann, 99, Austrian mineralogist and geologist.

=== 17 ===
- Ahmad Akbari, 75, Iranian Olympic fencer (1976).
- Masum Aziz, 70, Bangladeshi actor (Ghani, Rabeya, Eito Prem), cancer.
- Borys Bespalyi, 69, Ukrainian politician, MP (1998–2007).
- Claudio Biern, 81, Spanish animator (The World of David the Gnome, Gladiator Academy), founder of BRB Internacional.
- Jagoda Buić, 92, Croatian visual artist.
- Dame Carmen Callil, 84, Australian publisher, founder of Virago Press, leukaemia.
- Antonio Del Prete, 87, Italian lawyer and politician, senator (1983–1987), deputy (1994–1996).
- Ralph DeNunzio, 90, American businessman.
- Heinz-Jörg Eckhold, 81, German politician, member of the Landtag of North Rhine-Westphalia (1995–2005).
- Josef Fales, 84, Ukrainian footballer (Karpaty Lviv).
- Om Gurung, 69, Nepali sociologist, cancer.
- Reza Haghighatnejad, 45, Iranian journalist (Radio Farda), colon cancer.
- Sayed Yousuf Halim, 62, Afghan judge, chief justice of Afghanistan (2014–2021), heart failure.
- Daniel Hwang, 69, Taiwanese politician, member of the Legislative Yuan (1999–2012).
- Ellsworth Kingery, 93, American football player (Chicago Cardinals).
- Yury Klimov, 82, Russian handball player and coach, Olympic champion (1976).
- André Kole, 86, American magician.
- Frances Muñoz, 92, American judge, cardiac arrest.
- Albert Nolan, 88, South African Roman Catholic priest and theologian.
- Rajes Perumal, 37, Malaysian footballer (PKNS, Kedah Darul Aman, Petaling Jaya City), traffic collision.
- Peter Polleruhs, 72, Austrian engineer and politician, MP (1993–2002).
- Michael Ponti, 84, German pianist.
- Roberto Rojas, 55, Bolivian politician, deputy (2010–2015).
- Ashot Sarkisov, 98, Russian nuclear physicist, member of the Russian Academy of Sciences (since 1994).
- Leonardas Sauka, 91, Lithuanian folklorist, linguist and translator.
- Claude Saunier, 79, French politician, mayor of Saint-Brieuc (1983–2001) and senator (1989–2008), cardiac arrest.
- Zbigniew Senkowski, 66, Polish trade union activist and politician, deputy (1997–2001).
- Ethevaldo Mello de Siqueira, 90, Brazilian journalist, science writer, and consultant.
- Younoussi Touré, 80, Malian politician, prime minister (1992–1993) and president of the National Assembly (2012–2013).
- Angelo Venosa, 68, Brazilian sculptor, complications from amyotrophic lateral sclerosis.
- Franz Vorrath, 85, German Roman Catholic prelate, auxiliary bishop of Essen (1995–2014).

=== 18 ===
- Roger Amuruz, 63, Peruvian engineer and politician, deputy (1992–2000).
- Robert Arrigo, 67, Maltese politician, MP (since 2003) and mayor of Sliema (1994–2003), cancer.
- Guy Avanzini, 93, French academic and philosopher.
- Thomas Cahill, 82, American scholar and writer (How the Irish Saved Civilization).
- Charles A. Clarke, 80, Liberian politician.
- Charles Duncan Jr., 96, American businessman and politician, secretary of energy (1979–1981) and president of the Coca-Cola Company (1972–1974), complications from a fall.
- Pablo Eisenberg, 90, American scholar, social justice advocate, and tennis player.
- Ole Ellefsæter, 83, Norwegian cross-country skier, world (1966) and Olympic champion (1968), and singer, cardiac arrest.
- Robert Freeman, 87, American pianist and musicologist.
- Robert Gordon, 75, American rockabilly singer.
- Henri Le Breton, 94, French politician, senator (1981–2001), mayor of Buléon (1953–2008).
- Tom Maddox, 77, American science fiction writer, stroke.
- Joel Marston, 90, American actor.
- John P. Meier, 80, American biblical scholar and Roman Catholic priest.
- Dolores Mertz, 94, American politician.
- Bülend Özveren, 79, Turkish television presenter and sports commentator.
- Valery Rubakov, 67, Russian theoretical physicist, member of the Russian Academy of Sciences (since 1998), complications from COVID-19.
- Walter Schröder, 89, German rower, Olympic champion (1960).
- Eugen Simion, 89, Romanian essayist and historian.
- Charlie Smithgall, 77, American politician, mayor of Lancaster, Pennsylvania (1998–2006), heart disease.
- Gus Stavros, 97, American businessman and philanthropist.
- Stuart Struever, 91, American archaeologist and anthropologist.
- Earl Strinden, 90, American politician, member of the North Dakota House of Representatives (1967–1989).
- Jean Teulé, 69, French novelist (The Suicide Shop), cartoonist, and screenwriter, cardiac arrest.
- Harvey Wollman, 87, American politician, governor (1978–1979) and lieutenant governor (1975–1978) of South Dakota, member of the South Dakota Senate (1968–1970).
- Yuri Zubakov, 78, Russian politician.

=== 19 ===
- Funminiyi Afuye, 66, Nigerian lawyer and politician, member (2007–2011, since 2019) and speaker (since 2019) of the Ekiti State House of Assembly.
- Stevanne Auerbach, 84, American educator and author, complications from a stroke.
- Omar Borrás, 93, Uruguayan football manager (national team).
- Nicole Catala, 86, French academic and politician, member of the Council of Paris (1989–2008) and deputy (1988–2002).
- Stanisław Ciosek, 83, Polish politician, deputy (1972–1985), minister of labor and social policy (1983–1984).
- Dália da Cunha-Sammer, 93, Portuguese Olympic gymnast (1952, 1960).
- Bob Giallombardo, 85, American baseball player (Los Angeles Dodgers).
- Louis Gigante, 90, American Roman Catholic priest.
- Dave Herman, 81, American football player (New York Jets).
- Allen Ische, 80, Canadian football player (Edmonton Eskimos).
- Kassian Lauterer, 88, Austrian Roman Catholic priest, abbot of Wettingen-Mehrerau (1968–2009) and member of the Cistercians (since 1952).
- Lucienne Legrand, 102, French actress (Hungarian Rhapsody, The Contessa's Secret, A Little Romance).
- Dina Merhav, 86, Yugoslav-born Israeli sculptor.
- Kōji Nakamoto, 81, Japanese actor (Yawara!, Asako I & II), comedian, and guitarist (The Drifters), traffic collision.
- John Jay Osborn Jr., 77, American author (The Paper Chase), squamous cell carcinoma.
- Joanna Simon, 85, American opera singer, thyroid cancer.
- Ali Tehrani, 96, Iranian Shia Islamic theologian and writer.
- Charley Trippi, 100, American Hall of Fame football player (Chicago Cardinals).
- Philip Waruinge, 77, Kenyan boxer, Olympic silver medallist (1972).
- Ibrahim Zukanović, 64, Bosnian football player (Čelik Zenica) and manager (Sloga Uskoplje, Iskra Bugojno).

=== 20 ===
- Travis Basevi, 47, Australian cricket statistician and historian, cancer.
- Atarah Ben-Tovim, 82, British flautist, cancer.
- Jacques Brault, 89, Canadian poet and translator.
- Bettye Crutcher, 83, American songwriter ("Who's Making Love").
- Anton Donchev, 92, Bulgarian writer (Time of Parting).
- Tom Emberton, 90, American politician and jurist, judge of the Kentucky Court of Appeals (1987–2004), house fire.
- Hal Jones, 89, Canadian ice hockey player (Trail Smoke Eaters).
- Helmut Kuhlmann, 82, German politician, member of the Landtag of Lower Saxony (1974–1998).
- Paul Lee, 91, American philosopher.
- Blanche Lemco van Ginkel, 98, British-born Canadian architect and city planner.
- Burton MacDonald, 83, Canadian biblical archaeologist, leukemia.
- Jiří Markovič, 79, Czech police investigator best known for catching serial killers Ladislav Hojer and Jiří Straka, cancer.
- Ron Masak, 86, American actor (Murder, She Wrote, Tora! Tora! Tora!, Evel Knievel).
- Carroll McClure Lewin, 79, American anthropologist.
- Josephine Melville, 61, British actress (EastEnders, The Bill).
- Jimmy Millar, 87, Scottish football player (Rangers, national team) and manager (Raith Rovers).
- Frank Reid, 76, Canadian football player (Ottawa Rough Riders, Winnipeg Blue Bombers).
- Lucy Simon, 82, American composer (The Secret Garden) and folk singer (The Simon Sisters), Grammy winner (1981, 1983), breast cancer.
- Trevor Stamp, 4th Baron Stamp, 87, British medical doctor and hereditary peer, member of the House of Lords (1987–1999).
- Al Sutton, 88, American anti-racism activist, jazz pianist and actor.
- Tsin Ting, 88, Taiwanese singer and voice actress (Diau Charn, The Love Eterne, The Mermaid).
- Louis Kotra Uregei, 71, New Caledonian businessman, politician, and trade unionist.

=== 21 ===
- May Blood, Baroness Blood, 84, Northern Irish peer, member of the House of Lords (1999–2018), brain cancer.
- Jim Bolla, 70, American college basketball coach (UNLV Lady Rebels, Hawaii Rainbow Wahine).
- Waldemar Fibigr, 56, Czech Olympic sprint canoer (1988, 1992).
- Marcin Giżycki, 71, Polish film and art historian, critic, and filmmaker.
- Robert Gordy, 91, American music publishing executive and actor (Lady Sings the Blues).
- Kathy Hogancamp, 68, American politician.
- Tom Hoover, 81, American drag racer.
- Wolfgang Jenssen, 80, German politician, member of the Landtag of Rhineland-Palatinate (1971–1979).
- Masato Kudo, 32, Japanese footballer (Kashiwa Reysol, Sanfrecce Hiroshima, national team), complications from brain surgery.
- Cynthia Lai, 68, Hong Kong-born Canadian politician, Toronto city councillor (since 2018), gallbladder cancer.
- Jackie LaVine, 93, American Olympic swimmer.
- Matthew Lorber, 87, American electrical engineer.
- Helmut Moritz, 88, Austrian physical geodesist.
- Janel Mueller, 83, American academic.
- Yoshimi Osawa, 96, Japanese judoka, pneumonia.
- John Ponsonby, 67, British Royal Air Force officer.
- Carmelo Ríos, 63, Puerto Rican Olympic athlete (1984).
- Rainer Schaller, 53, German entrepreneur (McFit, Gold's Gym), plane crash.
- Peter Schjeldahl, 80, American art critic (The New Yorker, The New York Times, ARTnews) and poet, lung cancer.
- David Scott, 75, English poet.
- Charles F. Stevens, 88, American neuroscientist.
- Silvana Suárez, 64, Argentine beauty queen, Miss World (1978), colon cancer.
- Asher Tlalim, 72, Israeli filmmaker, cancer.
- War of Attrition, 23, Irish racehorse, Cheltenham Gold Cup winner (2006).
- Harry White, 78, Australian jockey.
- Xu Guangchun, 77, Chinese politician, CPC secretary of Henan (2004–2009).

=== 22 ===
- Bernard Atha, 94, English actor (Kes, Coronation Street) and politician, mayor of Leeds (2000–2001).
- Umberto Bellocco, 84, Italian mobster, founder of Bellocco 'ndrina.
- John Blackburn, 90, British abstract painter.
- Patrick Coveney, 88, Irish Roman Catholic prelate, archbishop and apostolic nuncio (1985–2009).
- Leszek Engelking, 67, Polish writer and translator.
- Rodney Graham, 73, Canadian visual artist and musician.
- Pádraigh Griffin, 47, Irish Gaelic footballer (Clonakilty, Cork).
- Burt Gustafson, 96, American football coach (Green Bay Packers).
- Dick Horn, 92, American football player (Baltimore Colts) and pediatrician.
- Dietrich Mateschitz, 78, Austrian businessman, co-founder of Red Bull GmbH.
- Aksel Nærstad, 70, Norwegian politician.
- Qian Zhengying, 99, Chinese hydrologist and politician, vice chairperson of the CPPCC (1988–1993), minister of water resources (1974–1988) and member of the CAE.
- Aristidis Rapanakis, 68, Greek sailor, Olympic bronze medalist (1980).
- Maurice Rich, 90, Australian Olympic athlete (1956).
- Marianna Roshal-Stroyeva, 97, Russian film director (The White Poodle).
- Lori Saint-Martin, 63, Canadian writer and translator.
- Barry L. Zaret, 82, American cardiologist, traffic collision.

=== 23 ===
- Vanilla Beane, 103, American milliner and fashion designer.
- Walt Corey, 84, American football player and coach (Kansas City Chiefs, Buffalo Bills).
- Don Edwards, 86, American cowboy singer and actor (The Horse Whisperer).
- Marian Fuks, 108, Polish historian, director of the Jewish Historical Institute (1968–1969, 1971–1973).
- Walter Gaudnek, 91, German artist.
- Amou Haji, 94, Iranian hermit, known as "the world's dirtiest man".
- George Nelson Hunt III, 90, American Episcopal prelate, bishop of Rhode Island (1980–1994).
- Michael Kopsa, 66, Canadian actor (X-Men: Evolution, Mobile Suit Gundam, Fantastic Four), complications from a brain tumour.
- John Lilipaly, 79, Dutch politician, MP (1986–1998), complications from Alzheimer's disease.
- Ian MacLeod, 77, Canadian football player (Edmonton Eskimos).
- Carlos Melancia, 95, Portuguese politician, governor of Macau (1987–1991).
- Paul Morantz, 77, American attorney and investigative journalist.
- Adriano Moreira, 100, Portuguese lawyer and politician, MP (1980–1995) and member of the council of state (2016–2019).
- Robert Nola, 82, New Zealand philosophy academic.
- Libor Pešek, 89, Czech conductor (Royal Liverpool Philharmonic, CNSO, Slovak Philharmonic).
- Galina Pisarenko, 88, Russian opera singer (Stanislavski and Nemirovich-Danchenko Theatre, Komische Oper Berlin) and voice teacher (Moscow Conservatory).
- Rock of Gibraltar, 23, Irish thoroughbred racehorse and sire, heart failure.
- Benita Senn, 93, Canadian tennis player.
- Arshad Sharif, 49, Pakistani investigative journalist (ARY News, Aaj News, Dunya News), shot.
- Cassius Turvey, 15, Australian teenager, injuries from assault.
- Walt Walowac, 90, American basketball player.
- Benno Zech, 94, German teacher and politician, member of the Landtag of Rhineland-Palatinate (1983–1987).

=== 24 ===
- Ash Carter, 68, American politician, secretary of defense (2015–2017), heart attack.
- Pinaki Chaudhuri, 82, Indian film director (Chena Achena, Kakababu Here Gelen?, Ek Tukro Chand), cancer.
- Louis S. Diggs, 90, American writer and historian.
- Dan Dougherty, 87, American basketball coach.
- Daniel B. Drachman, 90, American neurologist, heart attack.
- Ken Fairweather, 77, Papua New Guinean politician, MP (2007–2017).
- Christine Farnon, 97, American music industry executive (NARAS).
- Ben Feigin, 47, American television producer (Schitt's Creek, Cheech & Chong: Roasted), Emmy winner (2020), pancreatic cancer.
- Myer Horowitz, 89, Canadian academic, president of the University of Alberta (1979–1989).
- Leslie Jordan, 67, American actor (Will & Grace, Hearts Afire, Call Me Kat), Emmy winner (2006), heart failure.
- Yuri Kosin, 74, Ukrainian photographer.
- Milomir Kovac, 60, Serbian-German veterinary surgeon, equine specialist and columnist.
- Vladimir Kulakov, 86, Belarusian politician.
- Thomas Meade, 86, British epidemiologist.
- Patricia Morán, 97, Mexican actress (Another Spring), first lady of Chihuahua (1968–1974).
- Urs Nussbaumer, 91, Swiss agronomic engineer and politician, councilor (1979–1991).
- Allison R. Palmer, 95, American paleontologist and geologist.
- Harriet Parmet, 94, American author.
- Fa'afiaula Sagote, 41, Samoan actor (The Orator).
- Laila Shawa, 82, Palestinian visual artist.
- Dieter Werkmüller, 85, German academic and lawyer.
- Terry Willetts, 82, English cricketer (Somerset, Cornwall).
- Tomasz Wójtowicz, 69, Polish Hall of Fame volleyball player (Legia Warsaw, Santal Parma), Olympic champion (1976).
- Peter Yang, 87, Hong Kong film director (The Escape) and actor (You Can't Tell Him, The Ammunition Hunters), bladder cancer.
- Anatoly Zourpenko, 46, Greek-Russian basketball player (Olympiacos, Papagou, Panellinios).

=== 25 ===
- O. L. Anderson, 92, American politician.
- Mohammad Abbas Ansari, 86, Indian Islamic cleric and political activist.
- Husnija Arapović, 78, Bosnian football player (Čelik Zenica, Borac Banja Luka) and manager (Schaffhausen).
- Jules Bass, 87, American animator and television producer (Rudolph the Red-Nosed Reindeer, Frosty the Snowman, The Last Unicorn), co-founder of Rankin/Bass Productions, cardiac arrest.
- Othman Battikh, 81, Tunisian Islamic scholar.
- Jean-Claude Bernard, 89, French Olympic hurdler.
- Marta Bunge, 83–84, Argentine-Canadian mathematician.
- Barbara Cooper, 93, American politician, member of the Tennessee House of Representatives (since 1996).
- Mike Davis, 76, American author (City of Quartz, Late Victorian Holocausts, Set the Night on Fire) and activist, esophageal cancer.
- Gordon Fee, 88, American Christian theologian.
- Leonie Forbes, 85, Jamaican actress (Milk and Honey, Soul Survivor, Shattered Image), broadcaster and producer.
- Sylvia Fraser, 87, Canadian novelist and journalist.
- Peter Gabel, 75, American legal scholar and magazine editor (Tikkun).
- Jim Halligan, 86, American academic administrator (Oklahoma State University) and politician, member of the Oklahoma Senate (2008–2016).
- John E. Hearst, 87, Austrian-born American chemist.
- Branislav Hronec, 81, Slovak composer, pianist and conductor.
- Kent Johnson, 67, American poet, translator and critic.
- Kim Keum-soo, 84, South Korean labor activist.
- Halit Kıvanç, 97, Turkish journalist (Milliyet, Tercüman, Hürriyet), television and radio presenter.
- Lewis Kuller, 88, American epidemiologist.
- Aristotelis Pavlidis, 78, Greek politician, minister for the Aegean (2004–2007).
- Brian Robinson, 91, British road racing cyclist.
- Franco Stradella, 81, Italian businessman and politician, deputy (1996–2013).
- Tony Street, 96, Australian politician, minister for foreign affairs (1980–1983) and MP (1966–1984).
- Phil Straight, 76, American politician, member of the New Hampshire House of Representatives (2012–2016).
- Charles B. Wheeler Jr., 96, American politician, member of the Missouri Senate (2003–2007) and mayor of Kansas City, Missouri (1971–1979).
- Farquhar Wilkinson, 90, New Zealand cellist, principal cellist of the New Zealand Symphony Orchestra (1955–1992).
- Rainer Zimmermann, 80, German Olympic handball player.

=== 26 ===
- Mashallah Abdullayev, 72, Azerbaijani military officer, National Hero (1992).
- Michael Basman, 76, English chess master.
- Arthur Bernard, 82, French author, academic, and historian.
- Mike Birch, 90, Canadian navigator.
- Kenneth Cracknell, 87, British theologian, complications from COVID-19.
- Imre Forgács, 73, Hungarian jurist, minister of justice (2009–2010).
- Lucianne Goldberg, 87, American literary agent and author.
- Hsu Yung Chin, 70, Taiwanese calligrapher.
- Vladimir Kostrov, 87, Russian poet, translator and playwright.
- Bob Lusk, 90, American football player (Detroit Lions).
- George Nedungatt, 89, Indian Jesuit priest and canonist.
- Vinayak Nimhan, 59, Indian politician, Maharashtra MLA (1999–2014), cancer.
- Lia Origoni, 103, Italian singer and stage actress.
- Julie Powell, 49, American author, subject of Julie & Julia, cardiac arrest.
- Agustín Ramírez, 70, Mexican singer-songwriter (Los Caminantes).
- James Roose-Evans, 94, British theatre director, priest and writer.
- Sebastian von Rotenhan, 72, German forester and politician, member of the Landtag of Bavaria (1998–2008).
- Esmayeel Shroff, 62, Indian film director (Thodisi Bewafaii, God and Gun, Police Public).
- Pierre Soulages, 102, French visual artist.
- Mark Vanmoerkerke, 70, Belgian entrepreneur and politician, senator (1994–1995).
- Rosalind Wiener Wyman, 92, American politician, member of the Los Angeles city council (1954–1965).

=== 27 ===
- Pedro Nicolás Bermúdez Villamizar, 93, Venezuelan Roman Catholic prelate, auxiliary bishop of Caracas (1997–2009), member of the C.I.M.
- Stan Bingham, 76, American politician, member of the North Carolina Senate (2001–2017).
- Bill Brison, 92, English Anglican priest.
- Ron Clark, 92, British Olympic runner.
- Semisi Fakahau, 74, Tongan politician, MP (since 2014).
- Joe Frank, 79, American politician, mayor of Newport News, Virginia (1996–2010).
- Vladimir Gligorov, 77, Macedonian and Yugoslav economist.
- Nipon Goswami, 80, Indian actor (Shakuntala Aru Sankar Joseph Ali, Hiya Diya Niya, Jonaki Mon).
- William W. Hay, 88, American geologist.
- Fritz Huitfeldt, 83, Norwegian lawyer and politician.
- Geraldine Hunt, 77, American R&B singer ("Can't Fake the Feeling").
- Ryan Karazija, 40, American musician (Low Roar), complications from pneumonia.
- Irakli Khakhubia, 51, Georgian economist, engineer, and politician.
- Lee Kai-ming, 85, Hong Kong politician, MLC (1995–2000).
- Pete Magrini, 80, American baseball player (Boston Red Sox), cancer.
- Donato Manfroi, 82, Italian politician, senator (1992–2001).
- Joyce Molyneux, 91, British restaurateur.
- Rukudzo Murapa, 82, Zimbabwean academic administrator and vice chancellor of Africa University.
- Maurice Olender, 76, French historian.
- Satheeshan Pacheni, 54, Indian politician, stroke.
- Rodney Peppé, 88, British author and illustrator.
- Carlos de la Rosa, 78, Argentine lawyer and politician, senator (1995–2001).
- Steve Sesnick, 81, American band manager (The Velvet Underground), complications from a heart attack.
- Tim Steeves, 58, Canadian comedian and television writer (The Rick Mercer Report, This Hour Has 22 Minutes, Still Standing), pancreatic cancer.
- Gerald Stern, 97, American poet.
- Bahaa Taher, 87, Egyptian novelist.
- Hank Weber, 97, American politician, member of the North Dakota Senate (1965–1966) and House of Representatives (1963–1964, 1967–1980).

=== 28 ===
- Ed Argast, 66, American college football coach.
- Eric Jean Baptiste, 52, Haitian politician and entrepreneur, shot.
- Neel Pawan Baruah, 86, Indian artist.
- Calvin O. Butts, 73, American pastor and academic administrator, president of the State University of New York at Old Westbury (1999–2020).
- Domenico Contestabile, 85, Italian lawyer and politician, senator (1994–2006).
- Herman Daly, 84, American economist.
- Vince Dooley, 90, American Hall of Fame college football coach (Georgia Bulldogs).
- Helga Dudzinski, 93, German Olympic figure skater.
- Dan Flynn, 79, American politician, businessman and rancher, member of the Texas House of Representatives (2003–2021).
- Bryan Gossman, 71, Scottish rugby union player.
- Jules Hardy, 90, Canadian neuroscientist.
- Ted Hayward, 98, English lawn bowler.
- Kymberly Herrin, 65, American model and actress (Romancing the Stone, Ghostbusters, "Legs").
- Ian Jack, 77, British journalist (Granta, The Guardian) and writer.
- Nancy Kilgas, 91, American actress (Seven Brides for Seven Brothers) and dancer.
- Marc Kravetz, 80, French journalist.
- Jerry Lee Lewis, 87, American Hall of Fame singer ("Great Balls of Fire", "Whole Lotta Shakin' Going On", "High School Confidential") and pianist.
- Helena Łazarska, 88, Polish operatic and vocal pedagogue.
- Andrzej Magowski, 56, Polish football player (Olimpia Poznań, Herzlake) and coach (Dąb Barcin).
- Mike Mayerske, 80, American football player and coach (Pittsburg State Gorrillas).
- P. J. McElroy, 90, Northern Irish Gaelic footballer (Liatroim Fontenoys).
- D. H. Peligro, 63, American drummer (Dead Kennedys, Red Hot Chili Peppers), combined drug intoxication.
- Hannah Pick-Goslar, 93, German-born Israeli Holocaust survivor (Laatste Zeven Maanden van Anne Frank).
- Safwan al-Qudsi, 82, Syrian politician, MP (since 1977).
- Larry South, 97, Canadian politician, Ontario MPP (1985–1990).
- Frankie Wilson, 52, Northern Irish Gaelic footballer (Antrim), bile duct cancer.
- Heinz Winkler, 73, Italian-German chef, multiple organ failure.

=== 29 ===
- Serafín Bejérez, 70, Uruguayan farmer and politician, intendant of Cerro Largo (1998–1999).
- Lars Brink, 78, Swedish theoretical physicist.
- Hugo Camps, 79, Belgian journalist, columnist and writer.
- François Chesnais, 88, French economist.
- Curt Gentry, 81, American football player (Chicago Bears) and coach.
- James Giffen, 81, American businessman.
- Conrad Landry, 83, Canadian politician, New Brunswick MLA (1978–1995).
- Wolfgang Lange, 84, German Olympic canoeist (1960, 1968).
- Paul Larson, 90, American football player (Chicago Cardinals, Oakland Raiders).
- Maurice Ligot, 94, French civil administrator and politician, deputy (1973–1976, 1978–2002), mayor of Cholet (1965–1995).
- Mikhail Mashkovtsev, 75, Russian politician, governor of Kamchatka Krai (2000–2007).
- Lyudmyla Milyayeva, 96, Ukrainian art historian and university teacher.
- Sir Peter Morris, 88, Australian surgeon, bowel cancer.
- Donal Moynihan, 81, Irish politician, TD (1982–1989, 1992–2007).
- Clark Murray, 85, American sculptor.
- Lukas Nola, 58, Croatian film director (Russian Meat, Celestial Body, Alone), cancer.
- Park Sil, 83, South Korean journalist and politician, MNA (1985–1996).
- Hava Pinhas-Cohen, 67, Israeli poet and writer.
- Susan Kelly Power, 97, American author and activist.
- Daniel Schmutz, 79, Swiss administrator and politician, Vaud state councillor (1981–1998).
- Heinrich Schneier, 96, German politician, member of the Landtag of Bavaria (1962–1974).
- Robin Sylvester, 71–72, British bassist (RatDog).
- Kirpa Ram Vij, 87, Singaporean civil servant and military officer, director, general staff (1970–1974).

=== 30 ===
- Noal Akins, 84, American politician.
- Ian Angus, 96, British librarian and editor.
- Andrew Dawes, 82, Canadian violinist.
- Peter de Savary, 78, British businessman, chairman of Millwall F.C. (2005–2006), heart attack.
- Jack Diamond, 89, South African-born Canadian architect.
- Martine Djibo, Ivorian educator and politician, MP (1975–1980, 1990–2010).
- Serge Dufoulon, 66, Tunisian-born French academic and sociologist.
- Mike Fanning, 69, American football player (Los Angeles Rams, Detroit Lions, Seattle Seahawks).
- René Fatoux, 86, French footballer (Lille OSC, Red Star F.C.).
- Ștefan Ionescu, 87, Romanian Olympic ice hockey player (1964, 1968).
- Kim Won-ung, 78, South Korean politician, MNA (1992–1996, 2000–2008).
- Rosemarie Köhn, 83, German-born Norwegian Church of Norway cleric, bishop of Hamar (1993–2006).
- Miklós Lukáts, 76, Hungarian politician, MP (1990–1994).
- Hugh McKean, 55, American politician, member of the Colorado House of Representatives (since 2017), heart attack.
- Anthony Ortega, 94, American jazz clarinetist, saxophonist and flautist.
- William Armstrong Percy III, 88, American historian and gay activist.
- Donald Hill Perkins, 97, British physicist.
- Les Piggot, 80, British Olympic sprinter (1972).
- Shane Reed, 49, New Zealand Olympic triathlete (2008), brain cancer.
- Reza Rezaee, 61, Iranian-Norwegian politician.
- Jack Terry, 92, Polish-American author and Holocaust survivor.
- Sammy Wilson, 85, Northern Irish footballer (Coleraine, Glenavon, Falkirk).
- Lucyna Wiśniewska, 67, Polish politician, deputy (2005–2007).
- Marek Wojtera, 58, Polish politician and farmer, deputy (2005–2007).

=== 31 ===
- Abbas Ali Akhtari, 82, Iranian ayatollah, MP (1980–1984, 2004–2008) and member of the Assembly of Experts (since 2020), cancer.
- Philippe Alexandre, 90, French journalist and writer.
- Hans Ulrich Baumberger, 90, Swiss entrepreneur and politician, councillor (1971–1975), member of the Council of States (1975–1983).
- Sonali Chakraborty, 59, Indian actress (Tak Jhal Mishti, Bandhan).
- T. J. Chandrachoodan, 82, Indian politician.
- Gentil Delázari, 82, Brazilian Roman Catholic prelate, bishop of Sinop (1995–2016).
- Bob Ellicott, 95, Australian jurist and politician, attorney-general (1975–1977), MP (1974–1981) and minister for home affairs (1977–1981).
- Geoff Feehan, 87, Australian footballer (St Kilda, Norwood).
- Jamshed Jiji Irani, 86, Indian steel industrialist, director of Tata Steel (1998–2001).
- Danny Javier, 75, Filipino musician (APO Hiking Society).
- Raj Kanwar, 92, Indian journalist (The Tribune, The Indian Express, The Statesman) and writer, heart attack.
- Samuel Katz, 95, American pediatrician and virologist.
- Jeremy Mansfield, 59, South African radio presenter (Radio 702, 947), liver cancer.
- Marvin March, 92, American set decorator (Annie, The Sunshine Boys, Lethal Weapon).
- Anna McCurley, 79, Scottish politician, MP (1983–1987).
- John McVay, 91, American football coach (New York Giants) and executive (San Francisco 49ers).
- José Nambi, 73, Angolan Roman Catholic prelate, bishop of Kwito-Bié (since 1997).
- Humphrey Bamisebi Olumakaiye, 53, Nigerian Anglican prelate, bishop of Lagos (since 2018).
- Willy Padrutt, 94, Swiss jurist.
- Mike Potter, 73, American racing driver (NASCAR, CARS Tour).
- Sharon Presley, 79, American feminist, writer, and activist.
- Andrew Prine, 86, American actor (The Devil's Brigade, Chisum, V).
- Eddie Robertson, 103, New Zealand geophysicist.
- Vage Shakhverdyan, 77, Armenian stage director and politician, MP (1995–1999).
- Keith Taylor, 69, British politician, MEP (2010–2019).
- Alan Thomson, 76, Australian cricketer (Victoria, national team).
- Adam Zimmer, 38, American football coach (New Orleans Saints, Cincinnati Bengals, Minnesota Vikings), chronic ethanol use disorder.
