= Marcel Blanc =

Swiss politician (1935–2023)

Member of the Council of State of Vaud
- In office 10 April 1978 – 30 November 1991
- Preceded by: Marc-Henri Ravussin
- Succeeded by: Pierre-François Veillon

Personal details
- Born: 12 March 1935 Brenles, Switzerland
- Died: 24 March 2023 (aged 88)
- Party: UDC
- Occupation: Farmer

Marcel Blanc (12 March 1935 – 24 March 2023) was a Swiss farmer and politician of the Democratic Union of the Centre (UDC). He served on the Council of State of Vaud from 1978 to 1991 as head of the Department of Public Works.

== Biography ==
Blanc was born in Brenles on 12 March 1935 to a Huguenot family who took refuge in Switzerland after the Edict of Fontainebleau. After training to become a farmer, he took over a field in his hometown.

In 1957, Blanc was elected to the municipal council of Brenles as a member of the UDC. In 1970, he was elected to the Grand Council of Vaud and became president of the UDC in the Canton of Vaud. He then became vice-president of the UDC nation-wide.

Blanc was elected to the Council of State of Vaud in 1978, succeeding his fellow party member Marc-Henri Ravussin. On 7 March 1982, he was re-elected to a second term, finishing second on the ballot behind Radical Democratic Party member Jean-Pascal Delamuraz. He was again re-elected in 1986 in the second round of elections. He was re-elected for a third time in 1990. In 1991, he resigned from his position, leaving office on 30 November.

During his mandate, Blanc was head of the Department of Public Works. He twice chaired the cantonal government, in 1982 and 1988. In 1991, the socialist Daniel Schmutz succeeded him as head of the public works department, while Pierre-François Veillon was elected to succeed him from the UDC and headed the Department of Finances.

Marcel Blanc died on 24 March 2023, at the age of 88.
