= Baumberger =

Baumberger is a surname. Notable people with the surname include

- Hans Ulrich Baumberger (1932–2022), Swiss entrepreneur and politician
- Otto Baumberger (1889–1961), Swiss painter and poster artist
- Philipp Baumberger (born 1967), Swiss former footballer
- Ruth Baumberger, Swiss orienteering competitor

== See also ==
- Nora Baumberger (born 1969), known by the stage name Dolly Buster, is a Czech German former pornographic actress, filmmaker and author
