= Kratul =

Ancient Illyrian settlement in Albania

Coordinates: 42°7′22″N 19°34′30″E

- Location within Albania
- Type: Settlement
- Periods: Iron Age, Classical
- Cultures: Illyrian
- Location: Shkodër, Albania
- Region: Illyria

Site notes
- Owner: Public

Kratul was an Illyrian settlement and fortification located in the territories of the Illyrian tribe of Labeates. The archaeological material indicates that life at the settlement was active from the early Iron Age (beginning of 1st millennium BC) until the 1st century AD. In the modern era it is the name of a city situated in Albania, north of Boks.

== Location ==
The Kratul fortification is located on a rocky hill near Boks, around 6 km northeast of Shkodra. From the site one can view the Shtoj plain, where a large necropolis with tumuli has been discovered, the Kir River valley and the Rozafa Castle.

== Description ==
The Kratul fortification represents a good example that sheds light on the typology of military architecture among Illyrians. The fortification wall encloses an elliptical shape area (which is uncommon among other fortifications but adopts well to the terrain) and covers about 0.5 ha. The wall was built using large blocks on both curtains, while the core is filled with smaller stones. The blocks are unworked and no mortar has been used. The walls' width goes up to 3.35 m while the height is 2.55 m. Three gates which served for communication have been identified. Two of them are across each other respectively on the north and south side, while the third one is on the east side. From a typological point of view the Kratul fortification is similar to that of Gajtan, although there are substantial changes in plan such as towers and the regular elliptic shape, which make it an interesting site. So far, there have been no trace of houses found inside the settlement.

== See also ==
- List of settlements in Illyria

== Bibliography ==
- Andrea, Zhaneta (1991). "Archaeology in Albania 1984-1990". Archaeological Reports. 38. The Society for the Promotion of Hellenic Studies: 71–88. doi:10.2307/581024. JSTOR 581024. S2CID 131323459.
- Fabre, Georges; Lamboley, Jean-Luc; Roddaz, Jean-Michel; Tassaux, Francis (1987). "Dix ans de recherches (1975-1985) sur l'Adriatique antique IIIe siècle av. J.-C., IIe siècle ap. J.-C". Mélanges de l'École française de Rome: Antiquité. 99 (1): 353–480. doi:10.3406/mefr.1987.1547.
- Fistani, Frederik (1983). "Vendbanimi i fortifikuar ilir i Kratulit / L'agglomération fortifiée illyrienne de Kratul" [The fortified Illyrian settlement of Kratul]. Iliria. 13 (1): 109–118. doi:10.3406/iliri.1983.1813.
