= François Iselin =

Swiss architect and writer (1940–2022)

- Born: 10 June 1940
- Died: 11 October 2022 (aged 82)
- Education: École Polytechnique Fédérale de Lausanne
- Occupations: Architect; Writer

François Iselin (10 June 1940 – 11 October 2022) was a Swiss architect and writer.

== Biography ==
After spending his childhood in Uruguay, Iselin returned to Switzerland at the age of 21 and studied architecture at the École Polytechnique Fédérale de Lausanne (EPFL), where he would later teach. While conducting research at the EPFL, he developed the AMB method, a computer program designed to control the behavior of materials while designing and constructing buildings. It also diagnosed and assessed damages while simulating the aging of each component to estimate a building's durability and degradation.

Iselin had also an active part in the debate against asbestos. As a writer, he contributed to the "Ecosocialism" column in the magazine SolidaritéS, Genève, published by the Solidarity party. The author of numerous articles, essays, and poems, he published his first novel in 2010, titled Partir de zéro : journal d'un rescapé.

Iselin died on 11 October 2022 at the age of 82.
