= Dieter Dieckhoff =

German politician (1929–2022)

Member of the Landtag of Lower Saxony
- In office 21 June 1974 – 20 June 1990

Personal details
- Born: 30 April 1929 Bremen, Germany
- Died: 14 October 2022 (aged 93)
- Party: CDU
- Occupation: Farmer

Dieter Dieckhoff (30 April 1929 – 14 October 2022) was a German farmer and politician. A member of the Christian Democratic Union, he served in the Landtag of Lower Saxony from 1974 to 1990.

Dieckhoff died on 14 October 2022 at the age of 93.
