= Joyce Molyneux =

British chef (1931–2022)

Joyce Molyneux (17 April 1931 – 27 October 2022) was a British chef and restaurateur, who became one of the first women to receive a Michelin star.

== Life and career ==
Joyce Molyneux was born in Handsworth, Birmingham on 17 April 1931.

Writing in The Telegraph in 2003, Jan Moir said "Throughout the 1970s and 1980s, the chef, Joyce Molyneux, was at the forefront of the growth of modern British cooking".

She worked in just three restaurant kitchens, Mulberry Tree in Stratford-upon-Avon in the 1950s, Hole in the Wall in Bath in the 1960s, and for 25 years at The Carved Angel in Dartmouth, Devon until her retirement in 1999.

In 1959 she met Stephen Rodríguez-García, who was working at the Mulberry Tree as a waiter. He became her partner until his death in 1994.

Molyneux died on 27 October 2022, aged 91.

== Bibliography ==
- The Carved Angel Cookery Book (1990)Credited to Joyce Molyneux and Sophie Grigson.
- Born to Cook: Angel Food (2011)
