= O. P. Sharma (magician) =

Indian magician (died 2022)

- Born: Om Prakash Sharma; 1942; Ballia, Uttar Pradesh, British India
- Died: 16 October 2022 (aged 79–80); Fortune hospital, Kanpur, Uttar Pradesh
- Burial place: Kanpur, Uttar Pradesh, India
- Occupations: Magician, musician, illusionist
- Known for: Magic
- Notable work: 37,800+ Magic shows across the country (to 2018)

Jadugar Om Prakash Sharma (1942 – 16 October 2022), popularly known as O. P. Sharma, was an Indian magician.

== Early life ==
Sharma was born and grew up in Kanpur, Uttar Pradesh. He began performing magic at the age of seven, and later earned a mechanical engineering degree. By 2018, he had performed nearly 39,000 shows, and was aided in his act by his son.

Death

He died on October 16th, due to prolonged illness at a private hospital in Kanpur, Uttar Pradesh.
