= Doug Brignole =

American bodybuilder (1959–2022)

Douglas Paul Brignole (December 15, 1959 – October 13, 2022) was an American bodybuilder, fitness coach, and author. He was a multiple-time winner of the AAU (Amateur Athletic Union) Mr. Universe and Mr. America titles. Brignole is said to be the oldest man to win the title of Mr. Universe.

Brignole was also known for his research and application of biomechanics principles to resistance training and for his use of cables, dumbbells, and isolation exercises rather than the barbells and compound exercises most commonly used by other titled bodybuilders. Brignole has consulted on a variety of topics including training protocols, trainer-client relations, and entrepreneurship.

== Biography ==
Brignole (the younger of two sons of Ines Ortiz Brignole and German Brignole, both natives of Chile) was born on December 15, 1959, in Pasadena, California. He began weight training at the age of 14. At the age of 15, he joined the gym of Bill Pearl, himself a four-time Mr. Universe winner in the National Amateur Bodybuilders' Association, who provided guidance and instruction. At the age of 16, Brignole began participating in bodybuilding competitions, which he would continue for the next four decades. Never a professional bodybuilder, Brignole spent the majority of his career in the Amateur Athletic Union (AAU) and National Amateur Bodybuilding Association (NABBA). At the age of 22, he won the 1982 AAU Mr. America in the medium-tall division and topped this achievement by winning the 1986 AAU Mr. Universe in the Light Heavyweight division.

In 1984, at the age of 24, Brignole opened the Brignole Fitness Training Club in his hometown of Pasadena. Like many other competitive bodybuilders, Brignole worked for several years as an independent personal trainer in West Los Angeles. In 2005 Brignole temporarily left the fitness industry. In 2007, Brignole returned to Los Angeles and resumed his work as a personal trainer, while also writing for various publications, including Iron Man (magazine).

== Competition career ==
Brignole's bodybuilding competition career spanned 43 years, from the age of 16 to the age of 59. At 16, after only two years of training, he entered and placed second in his first competition, the 1976 Teenage Mr. Compton Contest. He subsequently placed first in eleven national and international bodybuilding competitions, including the 1983 AAU Mr. America, 1986 WABBA (World Amateur Bodybuilding Association) Mr. Universe, 1991 AAU Northwestern Mr. America, 2000 NPC (National Physique Committee) Championship, and 2014 Muscle Beach International contests.

In 2019, at the age of 59, Brignole won the title of AAU Mr. Universe not only in his age category (the Master's Division), but also in the Open Division, competing against bodybuilders of all ages. To date, Brignole appears to have been the oldest person to have captured the title Mr. Universe in the Open Division of any bodybuilding association.

== Bodybuilding titles and awards ==
- 1976 AAU Teenage Mr. Compton, 2nd place
- 1977 AAU Teenage Mr. California, 5th place
- 1979 AAU Teenage Mr. California, 1st place in division
- 1979 AAU Teenage Mr. America, 3rd place in division
- 1979 NBA (Natural Bodybuilding Association) Teenage Mr. America, 1st place overall
- 1982 AAU Mr. California, 1st place overall
- 1983 AAU Mr. America, 5th place in division
- 1986 AAU Mr. America, 1st place in division
- 1986 AAU / WABBA (World Amateur BodyBuilding Association) Mr. Universe, 1st place in division
- 1991 AAU Northwestern Mr. America, 1st place overall
- 1991 AAU Mr. America, 5th place in division
- 1991 NABBA (National Amateur Bodybuilders Association) Mr. Universe, 12th place in division
- 2000 NPC (National Physique Committee) Los Angeles Championship, 1st place in Master's Division
- 2010 Muscle Beach International, 1st place in Master's Division
- 2010 NPC West Coast Classic, 2nd place in Master's Division
- 2011 NPC West Coast Classic, 2nd place in Master's Division
- 2011 NPC Masters Nationals, 9th place in Master's Division
- 2012 NABBA World Championship, 7th place in Master's Division
- 2014 Muscle Beach International, 1st place in Master's Division
- 2014 NABBA World Championship, 7th place in Master's Division
- 2016 WFF (World Fitness Federation) World Championship, 8th place in Master's Division
- 2019 AAU Mr. Universe, 1st place in Master's Division and Open Division
- Brignole was inducted into the NABBA Hall of Fame on December 18, 2012, and was awarded the AAU Legends of Bodybuilding trophy on September 16, 2017.

== Training philosophy and controversy ==
After capturing the 1986 AAU Mr. America title, Brignole's body "was a mess" from the pain of training. Consequently, Brignole gradually became a proponent of the use of cables and dumbbells for isolation exercises instead of more traditional training methods that employ barbells in compound exercises. Breaking from long-held beliefs that particular exercises can target specific areas of individual muscles, Brignole expressed his training protocols in interviews and articles for Iron Man Magazine and other publications. As done by other competitive bodybuilders such as Arnold Schwarzenegger, Dave Draper, and Lee Priest, among others, Brignole not only wrote articles, but authored a book about his training and competition techniques and philosophy (the 2017 work The Physics of Fitness, retitled in 2020 The Physics of Resistance Exercise). In addition, Brignole co-authored the book Million Dollar Muscle: A Historical and Sociological Perspective of the Fitness Industry with Dr. Adrian J. Tann.

However, Brignole's promotion of single-joint exercises, paired with a rejection of many traditional compound (multi-joint) exercises, was not greeted with universal approval. Brignole's methods garnered pushback from some bodybuilders who prefer compound exercises such as the overhead press, an exercise singled out by Brignole as especially problematic.

== Death ==
Brignole died of complications from a second or third wave strain of COVID-19 and pre-existing atherosclerotic cardiovascular disease on October 13, 2022, at the age of 62.

Brignole was vocal in denouncing uninformed views and conspiracy-theory fear-mongering concerning the safety of COVID-19 vaccinations. On April 5, 2021, having recently received his COVID-19 vaccine he posted the following on social media:

I'm vaccinated! Well, the first of two. Let's get this done so we can get back to traveling, going to concerts, and having fun. My vaccine was yesterday, and I had no problem with it. My deltoid was a bit sore but otherwise fine. We're all in this together, so let's do our share to beat it. I have enough confidence in the vaccine, based on my research, to get it done. Those of you who think the vaccine kills people can use me as a test. If I die, you are right. If I don't die and have no ill effects, you were wrong and should admit it (at least to yourselves). Better yet, you should admit to the world who misled you, so other people can benefit by avoiding those fear mongers.

== Tributes ==
Numerous tributes to Brignole from around the fitness community were made at his unexpected death. The AAU, in which Brignole competed most often, has renamed an event in Brignole's honor: the 2023 AAU Doug Brignole North American Bodybuilding & Fitness Championships, April 14–16, 2023, in Laughlin, Nevada.
