= Robert Henry Doolan =

American airman (c. 1916 – 2022)

Robert Henry Doolan (March 21, 1917 – October 5, 2022) was an airman living in Cincinnati, Ohio. During World War II, he was a navigator on a B-17 Flying Fortress before being captured by the Germans.

== Early life ==
Doolan was born and raised in the West End neighborhood of Cincinnati. He graduated from St. Xavier High School in 1935.

== World War II ==
Doolan enlisted in the Army Air Corps in the summer of 1941, but washed out of pilot school and was instated at graduation as a second lieutenant navigator. Doolan was a member of the 326th Bomb Squadron, 92nd Bomb Group (H), in the 8th Air Force, achieving the rank of First Lieutenant at the end of his tour of duty. He took part in 12 combat missions from January to August 1943 when he was shot down on his 13th mission.

=== Captivity ===
After the failure of the 13th mission Doolan and another airman co/pilot Donald Elbert Weir spent 21 days attempting to escape back to England, with aid from the Dutch resistance before being captured and taken to a prison camp. Doolan recalled "The next day we were going to go into Belgium, and we got word that our pilot made it to France and was captured in or near Paris, the two gunners had made it into Belgium and were captured also. So there was a good chance our next safe house is compromised. And it was, Doolan and Weir were knocked unconscious one by one by the Gestapo as they entered the safe house door. A German Luftwaffe officer days later prevented them from being shot as spys, as they were in civilian clothes when captured after weeks on the run. He entered the holding cell in the finest uniform they had ever seen and ordered the Gestapo to hand them over to him for transport to a POW camp. There was honor between "Flyers". Bob did research and contacted the family of one of the German fighter pilots (he didn't survive the war) who escorted the B17 to its belly landing in a Dutch field".

He spent two years in the Stalag Luft III prison camp which was made famous by the 1963 film The Great Escape. Doolan was evacuated from the camp with other POW's in January 1945 by the Germans to avoid the Soviet Red Army where they were marched and moved by train cars to a new camp at Moosburg, Germany. The Moosburg prison camp was liberated by General George Patton and Doolan returned to the United States in 1945.

== After the war ==
After Doolan returned from the war, he married Dolores Doolan and completed a bachelor's degree in civil engineering at the University of Cincinnati. He worked as a tour guide and founded a Boy Scouts troop, leading it for 30 years.

He died on October 5, 2022.
