= Kim Won-ung =

South Korean politician (1944–2022)

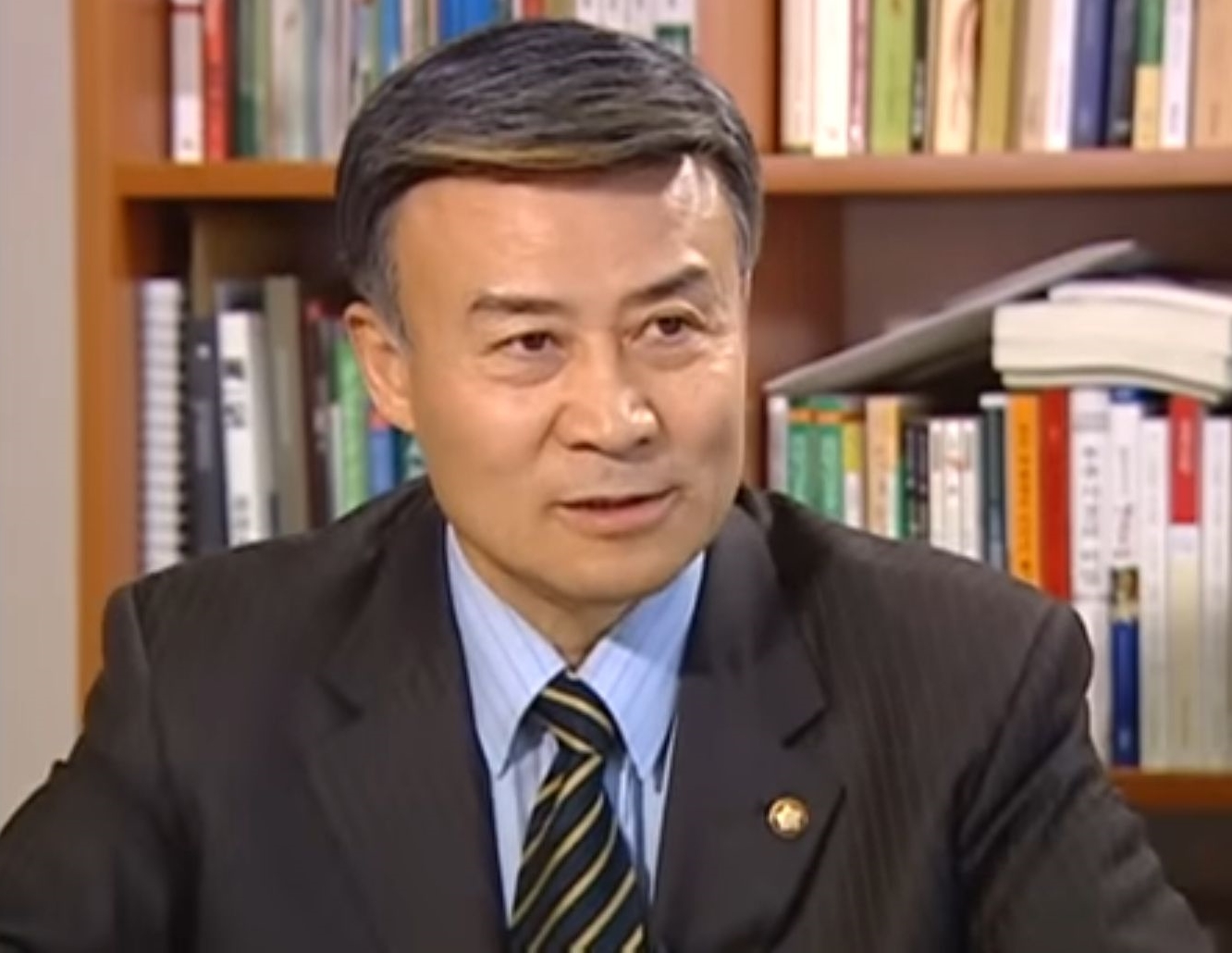

Member of the National Assembly of South Korea
- In office 30 May 2000 – 29 May 2008
- Preceded by: Lee In-gu
- Succeeded by: Kim Chang-soo
- Constituency: Daedeok-gu
- In office 30 May 1992 – 29 May 1996
- Preceded by: Lee In-gu
- Succeeded by: Lee In-gu
- Constituency: Daedeok-gu

Personal details
- Born: 8 March 1944 Chongqing, China
- Died: 30 October 2022 (aged 78)
- Party: Democratic Party; Grand National Party; Uri Party
- Education: Seoul National University; National Chengchi University

Kim Won-ung (Korean: 김원웅; 8 March 1944 – 30 October 2022) was a South Korean politician. A member of the Democratic Party, the Grand National Party, and the Uri Party, he served in the National Assembly from 1992 to 1996 and again from 2000 to 2008.

Kim died on 30 October 2022, at the age of 78.
