= Hsu Yung Chin =

Taiwanese calligrapher (1951–2022)

- Born: 13 November 1951; Miaoli, Taiwan
- Died: 26 October 2022 (aged 70)
- Known for: Chinese Calligraphy, Chinese Painting

Hsu Yung Chin (Traditional Chinese: 徐永進; 13 November 1951 – 26 October 2022) was a Taiwanese artist and calligrapher. Originally known for traditional Chinese calligraphy, in the 1990s he began to gain renown for his postmodernist calligraphy and ink paintings.

== Biography ==
Hsu was born in Miaoli, Taiwan. His parents were farmers and his father also worked as a construction worker. At the age of 22, he graduated from Hsinchu Teacher's College. After working as an elementary school teacher for several years, he returned to university and got a degree in Chinese Literature from Shida University. After graduation, he worked as a secretary for the dean of Ming Chuan University for three years before becoming an artist full-time. He was married to Zheng Fang He, a widely published art critic.

Hsu died on 26 October 2022, at the age of 70.

== Notable exhibitions ==
- 1981 Group Calligraphy Exhibition, National Museum of History, Taipei, Taiwan
- 1989 Solo Calligraphy Exhibition, Taipei Fine Arts Museum, Taipei, Taiwan
- 1989 Solo Ink Painting Exhibition, National Taiwan Museum of Fine Arts, Taichung, Taiwan
- 1993 The Beauty of Taiwan, Taipei Fine Arts Museum, Taipei, Taiwan
- 1998 The Nudes, Taichung City Cultural Center, Taichung, Taiwan
- 2005 International Contemporary Calligraphy Exhibition, China Academy of Art, Hangzhou, China
- 2007 International Contemporary Calligraphy Exhibition, Taipei Fine Arts Museum, Taipei, Taiwan
- 2009 Busan Calligraphy Biennale Exhibition (Co-exhibition), Busan Museum of Modern Art, Busan, Korea
- 2010 Praying Words (Co-exhibition), World Expo 2010, Shanghai, China
- 2011 Beyond Calligraphy, Museum of Contemporary Art, Taipei, Taiwan
- 2014 The Flow of Ink, Art Stage Singapore, Singapore
- 2015 Eastern Tao, Solo Calligraphy Exhibition, A.Rome Gallery, Rome, Italy
- 2015 Beyond Visuality, Art Taipei, Taipei, Taiwan
- 2016 ART CENTRAL, Hong Kong, China
- 2016 Solo Calligraphy Exhibition, Taipei Economic and Cultural Representative Office in Japan, Tokyo, Japan
- 2016 An Infinite Progression, Art Taipei, Taipei, Taiwan
- 2017 I Nature, Art Taipei, Taipei, Taiwan
- 2017 I Nature, Ink Asia, Hong Kong
- 2019 Flowing Fragrance Upon Calligraphy, INK NOW Art Expo, Taipei, Taiwan
- 2019 Contemporary Calligraphy, Seattle Art Fair, Seattle, United States

== Awards ==
In 1976, when Hsu was 26 years old, he won first prize for calligraphy at Taiwan's 30th annual National Art Competition. Before giving up competition in 1978, he had won six other national calligraphy competitions.

== Postmodern Chinese Calligraphy ==
Hsu Yung Chin's calligraphy has been described as modern and postmodern, because it breaks with traditional calligraphy's rules regarding form, color, materials, and subject matter in order to create a more visceral and contemporary aesthetic. Hsu turned away from traditional calligraphy because he felt it was too steeped in conservatism to be relevant to contemporary Chinese society. While the content and aesthetic of Hsu's works are postmodern, he maintains the traditional relationship between calligraphy and Zen practice, focusing on the act of painting as opposed to the work that is created
