= John-Erik Franzén =

Swedish artist (1942–2022)

John-Erik Franzén (1942 – 6 October 2022) was a Swedish artist, mainly a painter, born in Stockholm, most known for several large paintings portraying cars and motorcycles, as well as being the artist behind the portrait of the royal family of Sweden added to the public exhibition at the castle in Gripsholm in 1985, and original paintings for several stamps also portraying members of the royal family.

In the 1960s he visited the United States for a long period and painted such works as Hell's Angels of Los Angeles, CA, Dough's Place and Cadillac Eldorado (1966).

Between 1988 and 1995 he served as a professor of art at the Royal Institute of Art in Stockholm and he was a member of the Swedish Royal Academy of the Free Arts since 1989. From 1991 he lived in Österlen, Scania.

Franzén died on 6 October 2022, at the age of 80.
