= Josef Fales =

Ukrainian footballer (1938–2022)

Josef Fales (Ukrainian: Йосип Георгійович Фалес, Yosyp Heorhiyovych Fales, 12 June 1938 – 17 October 2022) was a Ukrainian footballer, coach, sports specialist and scientist.

== Life ==
Fales was born in Svaliava, Czechoslovakia (now Ukraine) on 12 June 1938. He was known as a defensive player who played for number of clubs among which are Trudovye Rezervy from Lviv and Leningrad (Saint Petersburg), Karpaty Lviv and others. After his sports career, Fales became docent and head of football department in the Lviv State University of Physical Culture.

Fales died on 17 October 2022 in Lviv, at the age of 84.
