= Guy Avanzini =

French academic and philosopher (1929–2022)

- Born: 7 July 1929; Grenoble, France
- Died: 18 October 2022 (aged 93); Aix-les-Bains, France
- Occupations: Professor; Philosopher

Guy Avanzini (7 July 1929 – 18 October 2022) was a French academic, historian, and philosopher. A professor of social sciences at Lumière University Lyon 2, he was a specialist in the history of pedagogical ideas and a historian of educational theories.

== Publications ==
- Le temps de l'adolescence (1965)
- L'Échec scolaire (1967)
- La Contribution de Binet à l'élaboration d'une pédagogie scientifique (1969)
- Immobilisme et novation dans l'éducation scolaire (1975)
- La Pédagogie au 20e siècle (1978)
- Histoire de la pédagogie du 17e siècle à nos jours (1981)
- L'école d'hier à demain: des illusions d'une politique à la politique des illusions (1991)
- Introduction aux sciences de l'éducation (1992)
- La pédagogie aujourd'hui (1996)
- Alfred Binet (1999)
- Penser la philosophie de l'éducation (2012)
- La pensée d'Antoine de la Garanderie - Lecture plurielle de Guy Avanzini, Guy Le Bouëdec, Thierry de la Garanderie et Jean-Yves Levesque (2013)
- Intuitions pédagogiques de Don Bosco (2016)
