= Terry Willetts =

English cricketer (1939–2022)

Personal information
- Full name: Frank Terence Willetts
- Born: 20 November 1939; Birmingham, Warwickshire, England
- Died: 24 October 2022 (aged 82); Truro, Cornwall, England
- Batting: Left-handed
- Role: Batsman

Domestic team information
- Years: Team
- 1964–1967: Somerset
- 1977–1990: Cornwall
- First-class debut: 1 July 1964 Somerset v Yorkshire
- Last First-class: 26 May 1967 Somerset v Kent
- List A debut: 10 August 1966 Somerset v Warwickshire
- Last List A: 2 July 1980 Cornwall v Devon

Career statistics
Competition	First-class	List A
Matches	16	4
Runs scored	333	28
Batting average	11.10	7.00
100s/50s	–/–	–/–
Top score	38	22
Catches/stumpings	4/–	3/–
- Source: CricketArchive, 6 June 2010

Frank Terence Willetts (20 November 1939 – 24 October 2022) was an English cricketer. A left-handed middle-order batsman, he played first-class and list A cricket for Somerset in the mid-1960s. He also played Minor Counties cricket for Shropshire and Cornwall. Although he was a prolific scorer at second eleven and Minor Counties level, he was not able to establish himself in first-class cricket.

Willetts played for Somerset's second eleven as a batsman from 1960, and in the 1964 season made more than 900 runs for the second team, playing in both the Minor Counties Championship and the Second Eleven Championship. He was brought into Somerset's first team for three matches in mid-season, but made little impact. The following season, 1965, he was given six matches, but only in the game against Glamorgan at Weston-super-Mare did he make significant runs, his first-innings 38 being the highest score of his career. His first List A appearance was in a losing Gillette Cup semi-final in 1966 against Warwickshire when he failed to score. In 1967, he played a further six first-class matches and two List A games, without success, and he left the county staff at the end of the season.

Willetts had a long career in second-class cricket. He joined Shropshire's Minor Counties team in 1968, moved back to Somerset's second eleven in the early 1970s and then went on from 1977 to Cornwall where, from 1988 to 1990, finishing at the age of 50, he was captain of the Minor Counties side. He appeared in one further List A match for Cornwall, in the first round of the 1980 Gillette Cup, when the Cornish side lost to Devon.
