= Kim Keum-soo =

South Korean labor activist (1937–2022)

Chairman of the Economic, Social & Labor Council
- In office 25 March 2003 – 20 June 2006
- President: Roh Moo-hyun
- Preceded by: Shin Hong
- Succeeded by: Jo Seong-jun

Personal details
- Born: 25 December 1937 Miryang, Chōsen
- Died: 25 October 2022 (aged 84)
- Party: DLP
- Occupation: Labor activist

Kim Keum-soo (25 December 1937 – 25 October 2022) was a South Korean labor activist. A member of the Democratic Labor Party, he served as chairman of the Economic, Social & Labor Council from 2003 to 2006.

Kim died on 25 October 2022, at the age of 84.
