= David Beckwith =

American journalist (1942–2022)

David Beckwith (October 30, 1942 – October 2, 2022) was an American journalist and political spokesman. From 1971 to 1978, he was a correspondent and legal editor for Time Magazine. In 1978, he was a founding editor of The Legal Times. In 1989, he was the press secretary for Vice President Dan Quayle. He then was the campaign manager for Texas Senator Kay Bailey Hutchison.
