= Rukudzo Murapa =

Zimbabwean academic administrator (died 2022)

Rukudzo Murapa
- Occupation: Academician

Rukudzo J. Murapa (c. 1940 – 27 October 2022) was a Zimbabwean political scientist, academic administrator, and the Vice Chancellor of Africa University.

== Career ==
He was the second vice chancellor of Africa University from 1998 to 2007. In the Zimbabwean context, the position of Vice Chancellor is equivalent to that of a university president in the United States. He is noted for his leadership, institutional vision, and contributions to the development of higher education in Africa.

During Murapa's tenure, he focused on strengthening the institutional framework of Africa University. He was counted among Africa University’s vice chancellors emeriti in recognition of his service to the university.

== Death ==
Murapa died on 27 October 2022 at the age of 82 at Murambi Garden Clinic in Mutare, Zimbabwe.
