= Peter Forman (cricketer) =

English cricketer (1934–2022)

Personal information
- Full name: Peter Ralph Forman
- Born: 9 March 1934; West Bridgford, Nottinghamshire, England
- Died: 3 October 2022 (aged 88)
- Batting: Right-handed
- Bowling: Slow left-arm orthodox
- Relatives: Frank Forman (grandfather)

Domestic team information
- Years: Team
- 1959 to 1962: Nottinghamshire

Career statistics
Competition	First-class
Matches	16
Runs scored	180
Batting average	10.58
100s/50s	0/0
Top score	26
Balls bowled	2534
Wickets	40
Bowling average	32.27
5 wickets in innings	1
10 wickets in match	0
Best bowling	5/73
Catches/stumpings	14/0
- Source: Cricinfo, 6 June 2019

Peter Ralph Forman (9 March 1934 – 3 October 2022) was an English amateur first-class cricketer who played for Nottinghamshire from 1959 to 1962.

Forman attended Oakham School, where he played in the First XI from 1948 to 1951. A slow left-arm spinner, his best first-class figures were 5 for 73 for Nottinghamshire against Glamorgan in 1962. He captained the Nottinghamshire Second XI in 1961.

Forman was a director of the family building company Forman and Linacre. He lived in the Nottinghamshire village of East Leake.

He died on 3 October 2022, aged 88.
