= Michel Herjean =

French trade unionist and Breton separatist (1943–2022)

- Born: 11 December 1943; Brest, German-occupied France
- Died: 6 October 2022 (aged 78); Guingamp, France
- Occupation: Trade unionist

Michel Herjean (11 December 1943 – 6 October 2022) was a French trade unionist and Breton separatist.

== Biography ==
Herjean participated in the events of May 68 in Brest. He joined Strollad ar Vro in 1973 and unsuccessfully challenged Socialist Mayor of Brest, Francis Le Blé, in the cantonal elections. He later joined the Front socialiste autogestionnaire breton and organized himself with popular struggles in Brittany, such as anti-nuclear and anti-oil slicks campaigns.

Herjean was arrested in the days following the 1978 Palace of Versailles bombing but was dismissed from the case. He was a member of the Breton Liberation Front from 1974 to 1981 and was known as an explosives maker. He was tried by the Court of State Security in 1979 and imprisoned until 4 August 1981, when he received amnesty from President François Mitterrand.

In 1983, Herjean became a founding member of Emgann and served as its secretary for international affairs for several years. He joined Skoazell Vreizh and served as its secretary-general from 1989 to 2003. In 1984, he organized alongside José Luis Álvarez Santacristina a network for Basque refugees in Brittany.

Herjean died in Guingamp on 6 October 2022, at the age of 78.
