= Wang Hongfan =

Chinese politician (1933–2022)

Member of the National People's Congress
- In office March 1993 – March 1998
- Constituency: Henan Province

Personal details
- Born: 1 September 1933 Xichuan County, China
- Died: 3 October 2022 (aged 89) Zhengzhou, China
- Party: CCP

Wang Hongfan (Chinese: 王宏范; 1 September 1933 – 3 October 2022) was a Chinese politician. A member of the Communist Party, he served in the National People's Congress from 1993 to 1998.

Wang died in Zhengzhou on 3 October 2022, at the age of 89.
