= Lee Yong-hui =

South Korean politician (1931–2022)

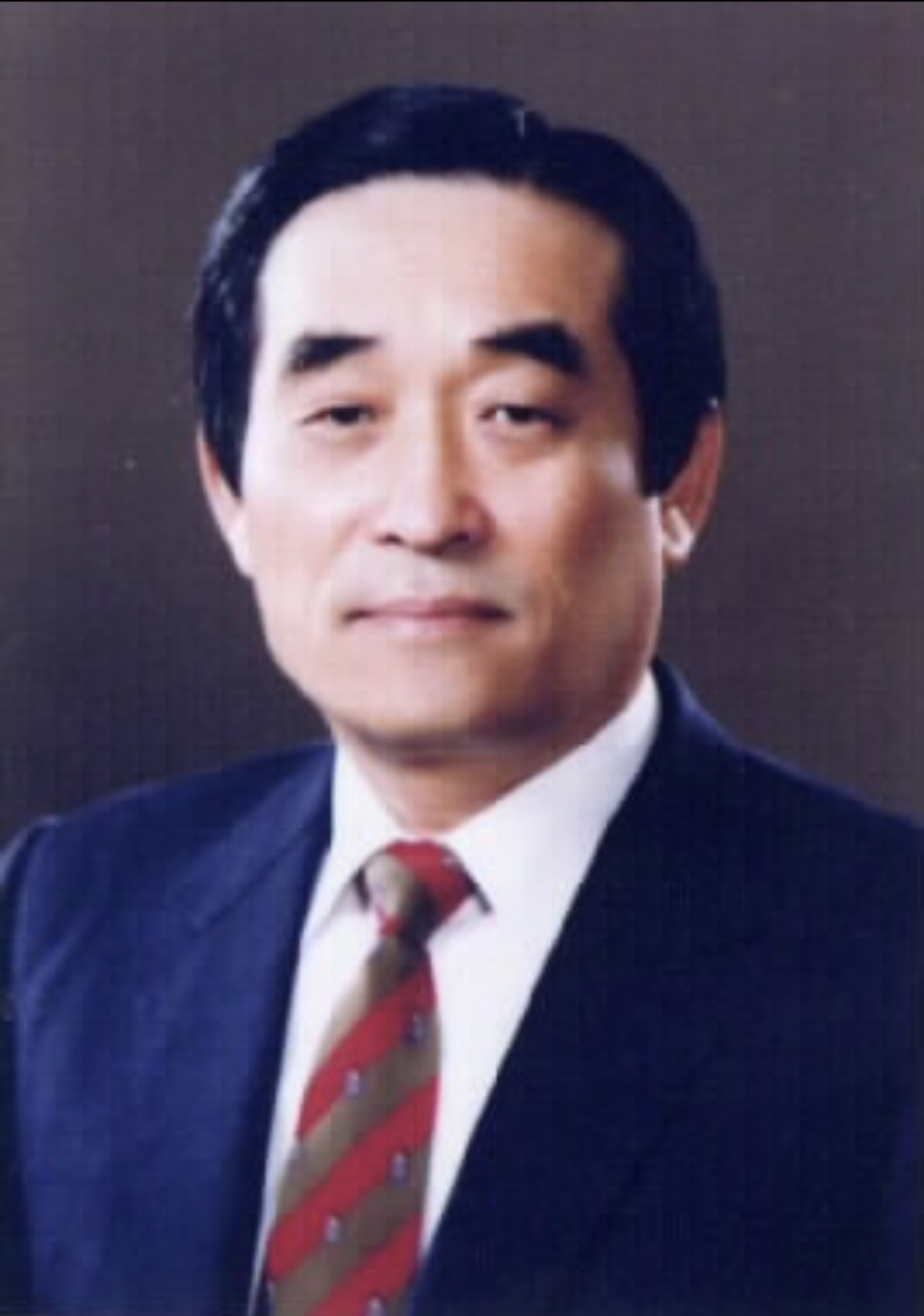

Member of the National Assembly of South Korea
- In office 30 May 2004 – 29 May 2012
- Preceded by: Shim Gyu-cheol
- Succeeded by: Park Duk-hyum
- Constituency: Boeun-gun, Okcheon-gun, Yeongdong-gun
- In office 11 April 1985 – 29 May 1988
- Preceded by: Park Yoo-jae; Lee Dong-jin
- Succeeded by: Park Jun-byeong
- Constituency: Boeun-gun, Okcheon-gun, Yeongdong-gun
- In office 12 March 1973 – 27 October 1980
- Preceded by: Yuk In-soo
- Succeeded by: Park Yoo-jae; Lee Dong-jin
- Constituency: Boeun-gun, Okcheon-gun, Yeongdong-gun

Personal details
- Born: 10 June 1931 Okcheon County, Korea, Empire of Japan
- Died: 16 October 2022 (aged 91) Seoul, South Korea
- Party: NDP; DKP; Uri Party; LFP
- Education: Republic of Korea Army Infantry School
- Occupation: Military officer

Lee Yong-hui (Korean: 이용희; 10 June 1931 – 16 October 2022) was a South Korean politician and military officer.

He served in the National Assembly from 1973 to 1980, 1985 to 1988, and lastly from 2004 to 2012.

Lee died in Seoul on 16 October 2022, at the age of 91.
