= Frances Muñoz =

American judge (1930–2022)

- Born: Francisca Muñoz; September 17, 1930; Miami, Arizona
- Died: October 17, 2022 (aged 92); California
- Occupation: Judge

Francisca "Frances" Muñoz (September 17, 1930 – October 17, 2022) was an American judge. She was "the first Latina trial judge in California".

== Early life and education ==
Francisca Muñoz was born in Miami, Arizona on September 17, 1930, the daughter of Fernando Muñoz and Benigna Muñoz. Her parents were immigrants from Jalisco; her father worked as a miner in Colorado. She was the fifth of eleven children in the family, and the first of them to graduate from high school. She spent ten years in night school classes while working days, to earn her law degree from Southwestern University School of Law in 1971, at age 40. Her younger brother Gregory Muñoz also became a judge.

== Career ==
Muñoz did agricultural labor in her youth, and managed a furniture store while she was in law school. She was a public defender early in career. She was appointed to the Orange County Harbor Judicial District by Governor Jerry Brown in 1978, and was considered "the first Latina judge in California." She co-founded the Hispanic Bar Association of Orange County, the Hispanic Education Endowment Fund, and the Ralph Luévano Scholarship Foundation. She retired from the bench in 2001.

Muñoz was active as a volunteer in after-school tutoring and enrichment programs. "My philosophy is that you need to get involved with kids at the earliest possible time," she told a reporter in 1998. "Otherwise they lose hope and drop out". In 1991, she appeared on a panel discussion program about "Latinos: Visions for the Future", on KOCE public television. In 2012, she was honored by the Latina Lawyers Bar Association. In 2015 she was honored by the California legislature with a Latino Spirit Award, for "achievement in law and public service".

== Personal life ==
Muñoz died from cardiac arrest on October 17, 2022, at the age of 92. There is a public mural in Costa Mesa, California, titled "Las Poderosas", which includes Frances Muñoz among the eight Orange County women honored.
