= Jean-Louis Pelletier =

French criminal lawyer (1936–2022)

- Born: 30 March 1936; Hyères, France
- Died: 11 October 2022 (aged 86)
- Occupation: Lawyer

Jean-Louis Pelletier (French: [ʒɑ̃ lwi pɛltje]; 30 March 1936 – 11 October 2022) was a French criminal lawyer.

== Biography ==
Pelletier began his career in Aix-en-Provence, where his clients twice received death penalty verdicts. He also obtained two Presidential pardons for his clients, one from Charles de Gaulle in 1965 and one from François Mitterrand in 1981. He was the defense attorney for Jacques Mesrine, Philippe Maurice, Francis le Belge,[9] Valérie Subra of the Affaire Hattab-Sarraud-Subra, and Danny Leprince of the Affaire Leprince.

Pelletier mentored many younger members of the bar, such as Éric Dupond-Moretti. He presided over the Association des avocats pénalistes.

Jean-Louis Pelletier died on 11 October 2022.

== Books ==
- Un certain sentiment d'injustice (1989)
- Profession : avocat.... de Mesrine à l'affaire d'Outreau (2012)
