= Kaori O'Connor =

American anthropologist

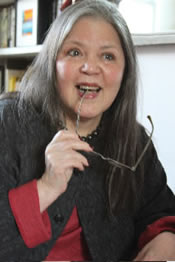
- O'Connor in 2014
- Born: Kaori O'Connor; October 24, 1945; Honolulu, Hawaii, U.S.
- Died: October 4, 2022 (aged 77); St John's Hospice, London
- Education: Reed College; St Anne's College, Oxford; University College London
- Occupations: Author, anthropologist
- Spouse: Peter Hopkins
- Children: Kira Eva Hopkins.
- Writing career
- Language: English
- Genre: Historical fiction
- Subjects: History; Social science; Anthropology
- Notable works: Lycra: How a Fiber Shaped America (2011); Pineapple: A Global History (2013); The Never-Ending Feast: The Archaeology and Anthropology of Feasting (2015); Seaweed: A Global History (2017)
- Notable awards: Institute of Making Grant 2014; Pasold Prize 2011; Sophie Coe Prize in Food History (2009)

Kaori O’Connor (born August 24, 1945 –October 4, 2022) was a social anthropologist and writer known for academic and non-fiction works that combine anthropology with history and archaeology, for studies of science and society, and for her work on material culture, commodities of empire, fashion, and the anthropology of food.

== Early life and education ==
Kaori O'Connor was born in Honolulu, Hawaii and grew up on Waikiki Beach. One of her great-grandfathers was a New England whaling captain turned sugar planter, another was one of Hawaii's first Japanese immigrant entrepreneurs. She was also part Hawaiian and Native American. She graduated from Reed College (USA) with a BA in Social Anthropology and went on to Oxford University (St Anne's College) to do a Dip.Soc.Anth and B.Litt. in Social Anthropology, studying with the noted structuralist Rodney Needham and the Pacific ethnohistorian Peter Gathercole.

== Career ==
Following Oxford, she won a job on Vogue through the Vogue Talent Contest, going on to become the founding editor of The Fashion Guide and author of a number of books on fashion including the best-selling Creative Dressing. Later, as editorial director of the-then independent scholarly publisher Kegan Paul, she was responsible for the acclaimed series Pacific Basin Books that reflected the cultural complexities of the Pacific in the nineteenth and early twentieth centuries. Returning to the academy, she won ESRC doctoral and post-doctoral fellowships and her doctorate was awarded in 2004 by UCL where she was a senior research fellow. She appeared frequently on radio and television, most recently Woman's Hour, The Great British Bake Off and The Great British Sewing Bee and contributed to newspapers and magazines including The Times Literary Supplement and The Oldie. In 2009 she won the prestigious Sophie Coe Award for Food History for her study of the Hawaiian Luau and in 2011 she won the Pasold Award for Textile History for her study of the Ladybird children's dressing gown in the context of the post World War II baby boom.

== Death and legacy ==
Following a brief illness, Kaori O'Connor died on October 4, 2022, at St. John's Hospice, surrounded by her family.

== Books and papers ==
- Seaweed: A Global History. Reaktion Books, 2017.
- The Never-ending Feast: The Anthropology and Archaeology of Feasting. Bloomsbury, 2015
- The English Breakfast: the Biography of a National Meal (revised edition) Bloomsbury 2013
- Pineapple: A Global History. Reaktion, 2013
- Lycra: How a Fiber Shaped America Routledge 2011.
- "The Hawaiian Luau: Food as Transgression, Transformation, Tradition and Travel". Food, Culture and Society, 11(2), June 2008, pp. 149–172. Winner of the Sophie Coe Prize in Food History 2009.
- "The Ladybird and the Dressing Gown: Cultural Icons of the 'Golden Age' of British Childhood". Textile History 42:1, 2011, pp 22–49. Winner of the Pasold Prize for Textile History 2011.
