= Milton Cabral =

Brazilian engineer and politician (1921–2022)

Governor of Paraíba
- In office 15 June 1986 – 15 March 1987
- Preceded by: Rivando Bezerra Cavalcanti
- Succeeded by: Tarcísio Burity

Member of the Federal Senate of Brazil
- In office 1979–1986
- In office 1971–1978

Member of the Chamber of Deputies of Brazil
- In office 1964–1971

Personal details
- Born: Milton Bezerra Cabral; 6 October 1921; Umbuzeiro, Brazil
- Died: 15 October 2022 (aged 101); Rio de Janeiro, Brazil
- Political party: PTB; ARENA; PDS; PFL
- Occupation: Engineer

Milton Bezerra Cabral (6 October 1921 – 15 October 2022) was a Brazilian politician. He was a member of the Brazilian Labour Party, the National Renewal Alliance, the Democratic Social Party, and the Liberal Front Party. From 1964 to 1971, he served in the Chamber of Deputies and was a Senator from 1971 to 1978 and again from 1979 to 1986. From 1986 to 1987, he was Governor of Paraíba.

Cabral died in Rio de Janeiro on 15 October 2022, nine days after his 101st birthday.
