= Antonio Del Prete =

Italian politician (1934–2022)

Member of the Chamber of Deputies of Italy
- In office 7 April 1994 – 8 May 1996
- Constituency: Apulia 16

Member of the Senate of the Republic of Italy
- In office 12 July 1983 – 1 July 1987
- Constituency: Martina Franca

Personal details
- Born: 26 December 1934 Taranto, Italy
- Died: 17 October 2022 (aged 87) Torricella, Italy
- Party: MSI; AN; AS; LD
- Occupation: Lawyer

Antonio Del Prete (26 December 1934 – 17 October 2022) was an Italian lawyer and politician.

As a member of the Italian Social Movement and the National Alliance, he served in the Senate of the Republic from 1983 to 1987 and the Chamber of Deputies from 1994 to 1996.

Del Prete died in Torricella on 17 October 2022, at the age of 87.
