= Ian MacLeod (Canadian football) =

Canadian football player (1945–2022)

Profile
- Position: Defensive back

Personal information
- Born: May 19, 1945; Edmonton, Alberta, Canada
- Died: October 23, 2022 (aged 77); Edmonton, Alberta, Canada
- Listed height: 6 ft 0 in (1.83 m)
- Listed weight: 185 lb (84 kg)

Career information
- High school: Ross Sheppard

Career history
- 1966–1969: Edmonton Eskimos

Ian Donald MacLeod (May 19, 1945 – October 23, 2022) was a Canadian professional football player who played for the Edmonton Eskimos. He previously played football for the Edmonton Huskies and was a native of Edmonton. MacLeod died on October 23, 2022, at the age of 77.
