= Richard Pollock =

English linguist and translator (1935–2022)

- Born: 7 May 1935; West Bridgford, England
- Died: 1 October 2022 (aged 87)
- Education: Bristol Grammar School; Mill Hill School; Peterhouse, Cambridge; Merton College, Oxford
- Employers: Marlborough College; Salford University; Bradford University; Margaret Thatcher

Richard William Wakefield Pollock (7 May 1935 – 1 October 2022) was a linguist, teacher and translator. He was the personal translator for Margaret Thatcher when meeting Russian leaders, especially Mikhail Gorbachev.
