= Paulo Henrique Paes Landim =

Brazilian politician (1938–2022)

Member of the Legislative Assembly of Piauí
- In office 1991–2007

Personal details
- Born: 14 May 1938; São João do Piauí, Brazil
- Died: 16 October 2022 (aged 84); Teresina, Brazil
- Political party: PFL; PTB
- Occupation: Doctor

Paulo Henrique Paes Landim (14 May 1938 – 16 October 2022) was a Brazilian doctor and politician. A member of the Liberal Front Party and later the Brazilian Labour Party, he served in the Legislative Assembly of Piauí from 1991 to 2007.

Paes died in Teresina on 16 October 2022, at the age of 84.
