= Lewis Kuller =

American epidemiologist (1934–2022)

Lewis H. Kuller (January 9, 1934 – October 25, 2022) was an American epidemiologist.

From 1972 to 2002, he was the chair of the Department of Epidemiology at the School of Public Health at the University of Pittsburgh. His work determined that menopause was a risk factor for cardiovascular disease.
