= Pierre Thollot =

American electrical engineer

- Born: Pierre A. Thollot Jr. April 6, 1933; New York, U.S.
- Died: October 6, 2022 (aged 89)
- Education: City College of New York
- Occupation: Electrical engineer
- Spouse: Jenny Thollot (died 2014)
- Children: 4

Pierre A. Thollot Jr. (April 6, 1933 – October 6, 2022) was an American electrical engineer.

== Early life and career ==
Thollot was born in New York, the son of Pierre Sr. and Louisa Thollot. After graduating from high school, he worked in a machine shop. In 1953, he enlisted in the United States Army, and served during the Korean War. After his discharge, he used his G.I. Bill benefits to attend the City College of New York, earning his BSEE degree in electrical engineering.

Thollot worked at NASA's Cleveland Lewis Research Center in Cleveland, Ohio. During his time at NASA, he served as head Brayton Controls and Electrical Components Section, and worked in the field of power generation and control subsystems. He left NASA in 1981.

Thollot served as research engineering manager at Sundstrand Corporation (SC) in Rockford, Illinois until 1996, retiring at the rank of chief research engineer. During his time at SC, in 1994, he was named a fellow of the Institute of Electrical and Electronics Engineers, "for contributions to the promulgation, growth, and application of power electronics technology".

== Personal life and death ==
In the 1950s, Thollot married Jenny, and they had four children. Their marriage lasted until her death in 2014. After his wife's death, he moved to Spokane, Washington in 2015.

Thollot died on October 6, 2022, at the age of 89.
