= Ivan Wolffers =

Dutch writer and physician (1948–2022)

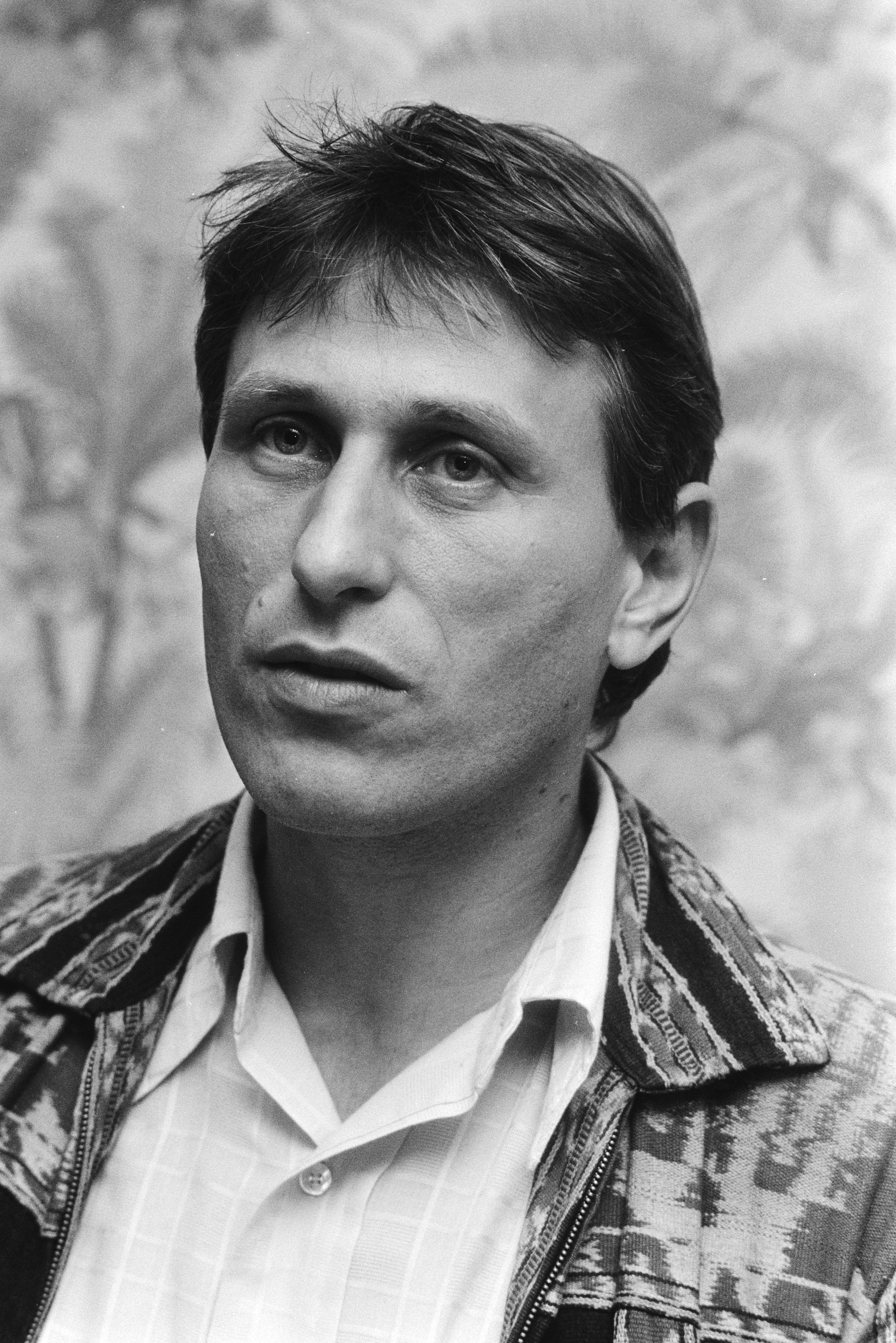
- Wolffers in 1983
- Born: 17 May 1948; Amersfoort, Netherlands
- Died: 7 October 2022 (aged 74); Bilthoven, Netherlands
- Occupations: Writer, doctor

Ivan Norbert Wolffers (17 May 1948 – 7 October 2022) was a Dutch writer, doctor and professor. In the 1970s, Wolffers was one of the first to write critically about doctors and the pharmaceutical industry. He encouraged his readers to think about their own health.

Wolffers graduated in 1975. He wrote a daily column about medicines in the national newspaper de Volkskrant. He retired as a general practitioner. With writing he wanted to reach more people and not only "one person" as a general practitioner. He was credited by Vrij Nederland as 'the most popular general practitioner in the Netherlands'. One of his biggest successes was his book "Medicijnen" (translated: Medicines). The book contains factual information and anecdotes. For instance what an effort it takes to convince doctors, due to the pressure of the pharmaceutical industry, that older and cheaper drugs are sometimes better. It was published in 1977 and over half a million copies were sold. With every new edition the book became thicker and was in 2006 more than a thousand pages.

Wolffers died in Bilthoven on 7 October 2022, at the age of 74.
