= Gerrit van der Linde =

Dutch jurist (1927–2022)

Justice of the Supreme Court of the Netherlands
- In office 17 July 1981 – 1 September 1997
- Preceded by: Klaas Wiersma
- Succeeded by: Dick van Vliet

Personal details
- Born: 25 August 1927 Ambt Vollenhove, Netherlands
- Died: 14 October 2022 (aged 95)
- Education: University of Amsterdam
- Occupation: Jurist

Gerrit van der Linde (25 August 1927 – 14 October 2022) was a Dutch jurist. He was a justice of the Supreme Court of the Netherlands from 1981 to 1997.

Van der Linde died on 14 October 2022, at the age of 95.
