= Willy Padrutt =

Swiss jurist (1928–2022)

Attorney General of the Swiss Confederation
- In office 1990–1993
- Preceded by: Rudolf Gerber
- Succeeded by: Carla Del Ponte

Personal details
- Born: 26 July 1928 Chur, Switzerland
- Died: 31 October 2022 (aged 94) Chur, Switzerland
- Education: University of Bern; University of Paris
- Occupation: Jurist

Willy Padrutt (26 July 1928 – 31 October 2022) was a Swiss jurist. He served as Attorney General of the Swiss Confederation from 1990 to 1993.

Padrutt died in Chur on 31 October 2022, at the age of 94.
