= George Johanson =

American painter (1928–2022)

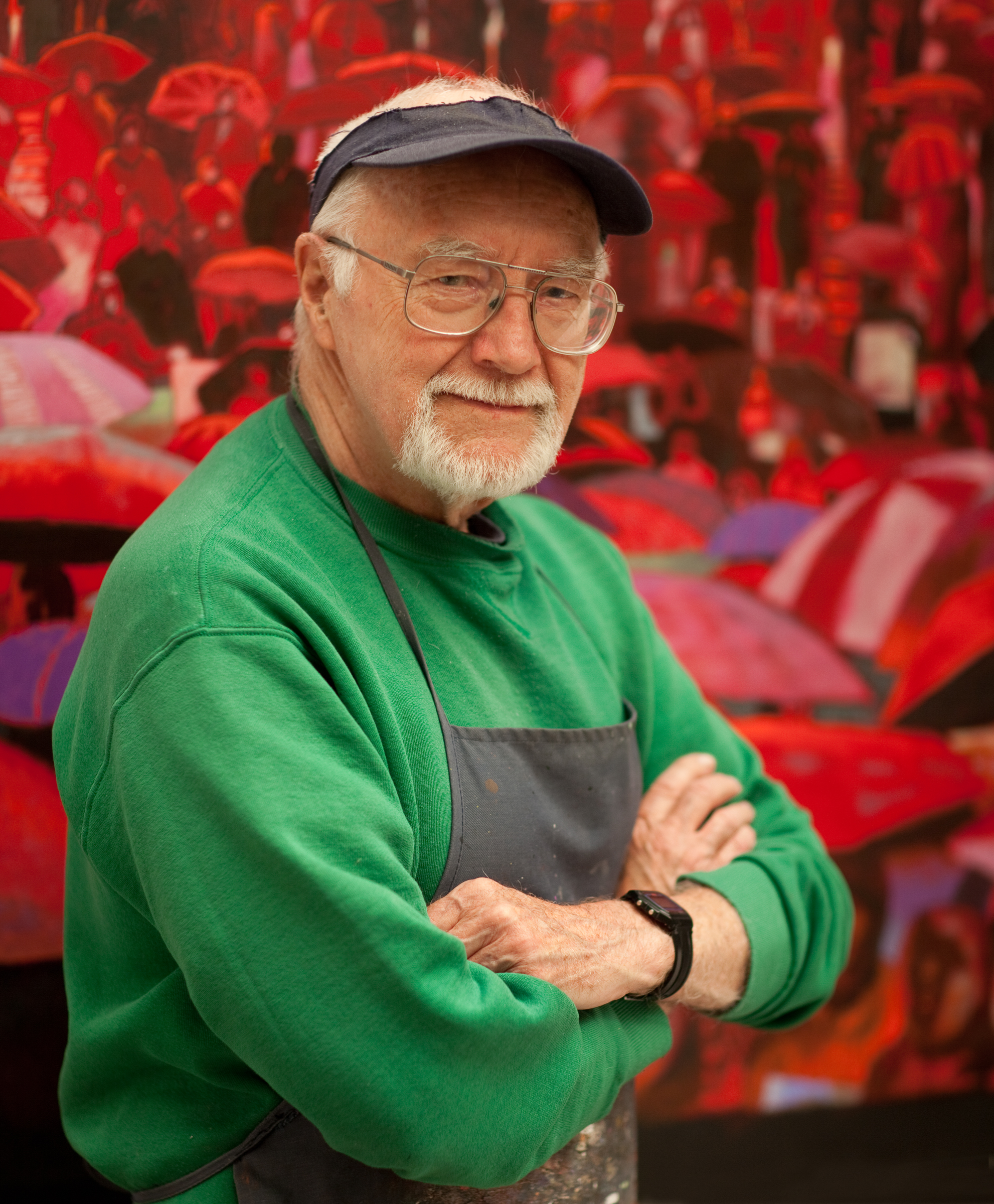
- Born: 1928; Seattle, Washington, U.S.
- Died: October 14, 2022 (aged 94)
- Occupations: Painter, printmaker, ceramic tile muralist
- Years active: 1950s–2022

George Johanson (1928 – October 14, 2022) was a painter, printmaker, and ceramic tile artist. Johanson studied at the Museum Art School in Portland, Oregon (now the Pacific Northwest College of Art), with further study in New York as well as London. He taught at the Museum Art School for 25 years until his retirement from teaching in 1980.

== Career ==
With more than seventy one-person shows, he is represented in numerous public and private collections, including the Portland Art Museum, the Hallie Ford Museum (Salem, Oregon), and the Smithsonian National Collection (Washington, DC). He received the Oregon Governor's Arts Award in 1992.

In 2002 the Portland Art Museum presented an exhibition of his drawings titled “Equivalents – Portraits of 80 Oregon Artists”. He was given a sixty-year retrospective of his work at the Hallie Ford Museum in 2007. In 2010 the Pacific Northwest College of Art presented a major selection of his paintings, “Seven Decades”.

Johanson actively worked and his art can be viewed at Portland's Augen Gallery.

== Early life ==
George Eugene Ernest Johanson Jr., was born in 1928 in Seattle, Washington. From an early age his parents and teachers recognized his precocious drawing talent. In 1946 he moved to Portland to attend Portland's Museum Art School (now the Pacific Northwest College of Art) with the aim of becoming a commercial illustrator. After a year of study at the Museum Art school, learning from artists such as William Givler, Louis Bunce, Mike Russo, and Jack McLarty, he decided to focus on fine art instead of commercial.

Between 1950 and 1953 he moved to New York to further his studies in printmaking and worked as a frame-maker at The House of Heydenryk while continuing to paint and take in the lively New York art scene.

During the Korean war, Johanson did alternative service between 1953 and 1955 with a Quaker group in Mexico. He moved back to Portland and took a teaching position with the Museum School in 1955. He retired from teaching in 1980 to devote himself full time to studio practice.

== Professional development ==
Johanson's style of painting during the 1950s and into the early 1960s could best be described as abstract expressionism. He developed a more figurative style from the mid-1960s, including figures in imaginary spaces but often within the framework of a recognizable landscape or civic event. Johanson's work is both fanciful and also loosely centered on scenes and events in and around Portland. An example of this can be seen in Black Rabbit's Red Room (1978; Hallie Ford Museum of Art). Strong color, use of distinct, often abstract patterns and a surrealist style of depicting figures, combine to create timeless views into ordinary events and scenes.
