= Urs Nussbaumer =

Swiss agronomic engineer and politician (1931–2022)

Member of the Swiss National Council
- In office 26 November 1979 – 24 November 1991

Personal details
- Born: 2 October 1931 Hauenstein-Ifenthal, Switzerland
- Died: 24 October 2022 (aged 91)
- Party: CVP
- Education: ETH Zurich
- Occupation: Agronomic engineer

Urs Nussbaumer (2 October 1931 – 24 October 2022) was a Swiss agronomic engineer and politician. A member of the Christian Democratic People's Party, he served in the National Council from 1979 to 1991.

Nussbaumer died on 24 October 2022, at the age of 91.
