= Allen Ische =

Canadian football player (born 1942)

Alan Ische
Profile
- Position: Guard

Personal information
- Born: February 20, 1942; Stratford, Ontario, Canada
- Died: October 19, 2022 (aged 80); Bayfield, Ontario, Canada
- Listed height: 6 ft 2 in (1.88 m)
- Listed weight: 253 lb (115 kg)

Career information
- College: Northern Michigan

Career history
- 1967–1971: Edmonton Eskimos

Allen Edward Ische (b. February 20, 1942 - d. October 19, 2022) is a Canadian football player who played for the Edmonton Eskimos.
