= Jean-Pierre Machelon =

French academic and jurist (1945–2022)

- Born: 31 March 1945; Gannat, France
- Died: 2 October 2022 (aged 77)
- Education: Sciences Po; Paris 2 Panthéon-Assas University
- Occupations: Jurist; Professor

Jean-Pierre Machelon (French: [ʒɑ̃ pjɛʁ maʃlɔ̃]; 31 March 1945 – 2 October 2022) was a French academic and jurist who specialised in public law. He was dean of the faculty of law at Paris Descartes University.

== Biography ==
Machelon studied at Sciences Po before defending his doctoral thesis at Paris 2 Panthéon-Assas University in 1973. From 1973 to 1979, he was a lecturer then assistant professor at Sorbonne Paris North University. He earned an agrégation in public law in 1978 and worked as a law professor at the University of Auvergne from 1980 to 1997.

In 1987, he started working at Paris Descartes University and became Dean of the Faculty of Law. He was also director of studies in historical and philological sciences at École pratique des hautes études, where he became chair of the history of European institutions in 1992. From 1992 to 1994, he was a technical advisor for constitutional and legal affairs in the cabinet of Senate President René Monory. From 1994 to 1997, he was Deputy Scientific Director in the Department of Human and Social Sciences at the French National Centre for Scientific Research.

From 2003 to 2005, Machelon was Scientific Director for Social Sciences of the Minister of Higher Education and Research. An expert for the Council of Europe, he chaired the scientific council of the Centre d'études en sciences sociales de la défense. From 2005 to 2006, he chaired the "Machelon commission", which conducted legal reflection on the relations of religions with public authorities and submitted a report to President Nicolas Sarkozy and the Ministry of the Interior on 20 September 2006. Sarkozy appointed Machelon to the Conseil supérieur de la magistrature, where he served from 2011 to 2015.

Machelon died on 2 October 2022, at the age of 77.

== Publications ==
- La République contre les libertés (1976)
- La Constitution de L’an III — Boissy d’Anglas et la naissance du liberalisme constitutionnel (1999)
- Les Communes et le pouvoir — Histoire politique des communes françaises de 1789 à nos jours (2002)
- 901, les congrégations hors la loi ? (2002)
- Les Relations des cultes avec les pouvoirs publics (2006)
