= Sergio Mims =

American film critic (1955–2022)

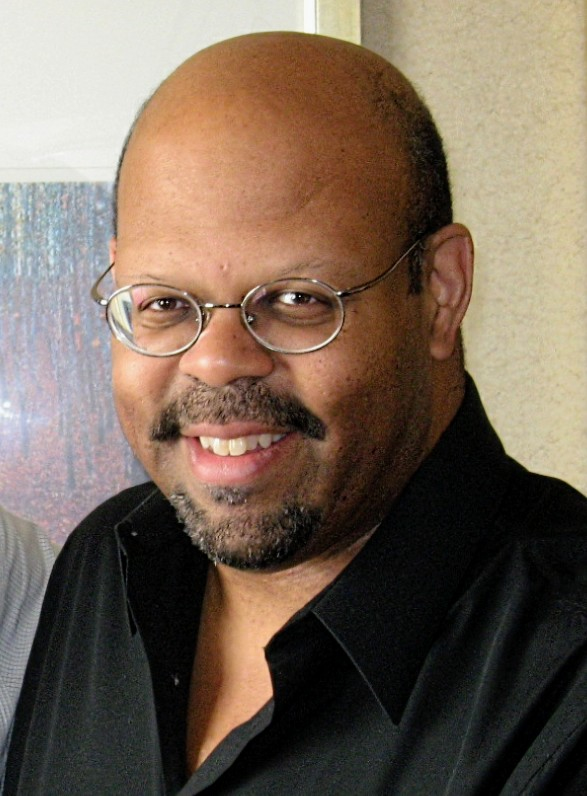
- Born: Sergio Alejandro Mims; January 13, 1955; Chicago, Illinois, U.S.
- Died: October 4, 2022 (aged 67); Chicago, Illinois, U.S.
- Education: University of Illinois Chicago
- Occupations: Film journalist and critic
- Family: Mother - Gladys, sisters - Judith & Lisa

Sergio Mims (January 13, 1955 - October 4, 2022) was a film critic, journalist, historian, co-founder of the Black Harvest Film Festival (Chicago), and a classical music commentator. In 2019, Mims received the Legacy Award from the Gene Siskel Film Center. He was also the host/producer of the weekly Bad Mutha’ Film Show on WHPK-FM (88.5PM Chicago) and the station's classical music format chief.

== Early life ==
Mims was born in 1955 to Ulester and Gladys Mims. He attended Kenwood Academy then went to the University of Illinois Chicago and graduated with a degree in economics. According to his sister, Lisa Mims, Mims developed a love for movies of all genres at an early age.

== Film and music ==
After college, Mims' passion for movies led him assist on multiple movie productions in Chicago, including "The Blues Brothers". Eventually, Mims became an assistant director on the film, "Penitentiary", Jamaa Fanaka's 1979 blaxploitation drama.

In 1982, Mims helped to establish Chicago's first Black-oriented film festival, the Blacklight Festival of International Black Cinema, with Terry Glover and Floyd Webb. When the Blacklight festival was about to end, Mims stepped up to launch the Black Harvest Film Festival with Barbara Scharres, who headed programming at the Film Center of the School of the Art Institute of Chicago. Since its founding, the Black Harvest Film Festival celebrated its 28th anniversary in November, 2022.

In 2019, Mims received the Legacy Award from the Gene Siskel Film Center, honoring his cinema passion and his contributions to the Black Harvest Film Festival as co-founder and programmer.

Mims was a frequent panelist for talks and film festivals. Mims also provided audio commentaries on a wide variety of DVD and Blu-ray movies. Earlier in 2022, at the Turner Classic Movies Film Festival, Mims gave the introduction to two Sidney Poitier films: Lilies of the Field and The Slender Thread. Mims also taught screenwriting courses at the DuSable Black History Museum and Education Center.

Mims was a radio host for “The Bad Mutha Film Show” on WHPK-FM. Mims was also a classical music fan and commentator. He used his personal collection of several thousand classical music CDs for a regular radio show he broadcast on WHPK, ‘Stuff From My Collection.’

== Death ==
After a long illness, Mims died from complications from colon cancer on October 4, 2022. Sergio is survived by his mother, Gladys, and his sisters, Judith and Lisa. In Sergio's honor, plans have been made to launch a foundation to aid Black screenwriters. The Film Center plans to host the 28th annual Black Harvest Film Festival from Nov. 4-27, 2022, in honor of Mims’ legacy.
