= Hugo Camps =

Belgian journalist, columnist, writer (1943–2022)

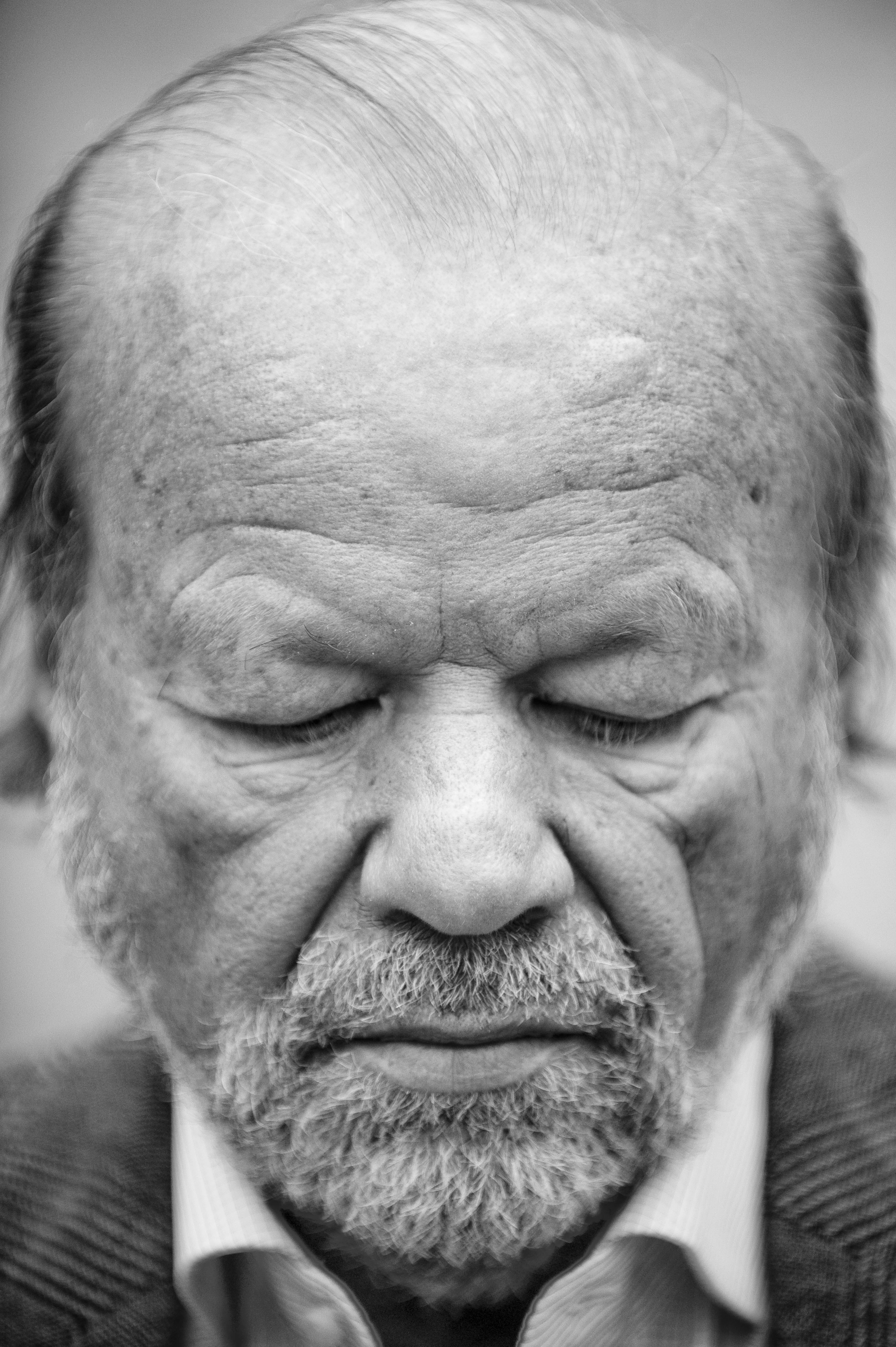
- Camps in 2011
- Born: 12 May 1943; Molenstede, Diest, Belgium
- Died: 29 October 2022 (aged 79); Knokke, Belgium
- Occupations: Journalist; columnist; writer

Hugo Camps (12 May 1943 – 29 October 2022) was a Belgian journalist, columnist and writer.

== Career ==
Camps published in both Belgian and Dutch magazines and wrote several books in particular about football and cycling. He worked for over thirty-five years for Elsevier Weekblad, for which he wrote a weekly interview and a column about sports until his death.

== Death ==
Camps died in Knokke on 29 October 2022, at the age of 79.

== Awards and prizes ==
- 1988 – Knight of the Order of Leopold II.
- 2007 – Bronze Medal of the Lucas-Ooms Fund.
- 2016 – Knight in the Order of Orange-Nassau. This was as a celebration of this 30th anniversary with Elsevier Weekblad. That day, in the presence of among others, the former Belgian Prime Minister Guy Verhofstadt, he was awarded this order by the Dutch ambassador to Belgium, Maryem van den Heuvel, during lunch at her residence in Brussels.
