= Harriet Parmet =

American writer and educator (1928–2022)

- Born: Harriet Abbey Leibowitz; July 22, 1928 Philadelphia, Pennsylvania, United States
- Died: October 24, 2022 (aged 94) Pennsylvania, United States
- Occupation: Author; Educator
- Education: Gratz College
- Alma mater: Temple University
- Spouse: Sidney Parmet
- Children: 2

Harriet Abbey Parmet (née Leibowitz; July 22, 1928 – October 24, 2022) was an American author and educator.

== Work ==
Parmet worked as a professor of literature and foreign languages at Lehigh University, and was a cofounder of their Jewish studies department. She has written extensively on religious views in Judaism and notably, Holocaust resistance fighter Haviva Reik. She particularly has criticized the lack of a "national hero figure" formed around Reik and her sacrifices during the Second World War.

She is the author of The Terror of Our Days: Four American Poets Respond to the Holocaust, a response of American poets who "articulate a collective consciousness" to the Holocaust, despite not having experienced it. In her writings on Judaism, she is notable for her article Rabbinic and Feminist Responses to Reproductive Technology, which discusses the contrast and similarities between feminist reviews on modern fertility treatments and interpretations by traditional Jewish halakha.

== Personal life ==
Parmet graduated with a degree from Gratz College and attended graduate school at Temple University. In 1949, she married her husband Sidney B. Parmet. She has two children, Jonathan and Howard.

== Selected works ==
- Lasker, Judith N.; Parmet, Harriet L. (1990). "Rabbinic and Feminist Responses to Reproductive Technology". Journal of Feminist Studies in Religion. 6 (1): 117–130. ISSN 8755-4178. JSTOR 25002126.
- Parmet, Harriet (1990). "Haviva Reik: A Woman of Valor". Midstream. 36. Theodor Herzl. 24 – via Google Books.
- Parmet, Harriet L.; Lasker, Judith N. (1991). "Religion and Views on Reproductive Technologies: A Comparative Study of Jews and Non-Jews". Shofar. 10 (1): 57–71. ISSN 0882-8539. JSTOR 42942246.
- Parmet, Harriet L. (1993). "An Approach Toward the Inclusion of Women Writers in a Course on the Israeli Short Story". Feminist Teacher. 7 (3): 41–46. ISSN 0882-4843. JSTOR 40535451.
- Parmet, Harriet L. (1994). "Jewish Voices and Themes: Rose Drachler, Julia Vinograd and Linda Pastan". Studies in American Jewish Literature. 13: 52–58. ISSN 0271-9274. JSTOR 41205842.
- Parmet, Harriet L. (2001). The Terror of Our Days: Four American Poets Respond to the Holocaust. Lehigh University Press. ISBN 978-0-934223-63-8.
- Parmet, Harriet L. (1995). "The Jewish Essence of Franz Kafka". Shofar. 13 (2): 28–43. ISSN 0882-8539. JSTOR 42942097.
- Parmet, Harriet L. (2000). "Images of the Jew Focused on in the Translated Polish Works of Tadeusz Borowski, Jerzy Andrzejewski, and Czeslaw Milosz". Shofar. 18 (3): 13–26. ISSN 0882-8539. JSTOR 42943062.
- Aronson, Richard J.; Parmet, Harriet L.; Thornton, Robert James (2010). Variations in economic analysis: essays in honor of Eli Schwartz. New York (N.Y.): Springer. ISBN 978-1-4419-1181-0.
