= Mark Vanmoerkerke =

Belgian politician (1952–2022)

Member of the Senate of Belgium
- In office 1994–1995

Personal details
- Born: 18 September 1952 Ostend, Belgium
- Died: 26 October 2022 (aged 70)
- Party: CVP
- Occupation: Entrepreneur

Mark Vanmoerkerke (18 September 1952 – 26 October 2022) was a Belgian entrepreneur and politician. A member of the Christian People's Party, he served in the Senate from 1994 to 1995.

Vanmoerkerke died on 26 October 2022 at the age of 70.
