= Zhaneta Andrea =

Albanian archeologist and prehistorian

- Born: 22 March 1937; Korçë, Albanian Kingdom
- Died: 14 October 2022 (aged 85); Tirana, Albania
- Education: Sofia University
- Occupations: Archaeologist, prehistorian
- Known for: Albanian prehistoric archaeology; Illyrian tumulus culture
- Notable work: Kultura ilire e tumave të pellgut të Korçës

Zhaneta Andrea (22 March 1937 – 14 October 2022) was an Albanian archaeologist and prehistorian, regarded as one of the first women archaeologists in Albania. She made significant contributions to the study of prehistoric and protohistoric cultures, particularly the Illyrian tumulus culture as well as the Bronze Age and Iron Age settlements in southeastern Albania.

== Early life and education ==
Zhaneta Andrea was born in Korçë, Albanian Kingdom. She completed her primary and secondary education in her hometown. From 1957 to 1961, she studied archaeology at Sofia University in Bulgaria, specializing in prehistoric archaeology before returning to Albania to pursue her professional career.

== Career ==
In 1962, Andrea began working as an archaeologist at the Archaeology Sector in the Institute of History and Linguistics, later incorporated into the Institute of Archaeology. Throughout her career, she participated in and directed numerous archaeological excavations across Albania.

She worked on major sites such as Maliq, Tren and Podgorie in the Korçë basin and independently directed excavations at Cakran, Kuç i Zi, Barç, Shuec, Nezir, Burim, Zagorë, Bujan, Gërmenj and Cërujë. Her research focused on prehistoric settlements, burial mounds and material culture from the Neolithic through the Iron Age, with particular emphasis on Illyrian archaeological contexts.

Andrea published numerous scholarly articles in academic journals and conference proceedings. Her monograph Kultura ilire e tumave të pellgut të Korçës (1985) is considered a foundational work for the study of Illyrian tumulus culture in southeastern Albania. She also authored specialized studies such as Vendbanimi shpellor i Nezirit, published in the journal Iliria.

== Death and legacy ==
Zhaneta Andrea died on 14 October 2022 in Tirana, at the age of 85. She is remembered as a pioneering figure in Albanian archaeology and as an influential scholar whose work significantly advanced the understanding of Albania’s prehistoric past. Her career also contributed to the broader inclusion of women in archaeological research in Albania.
