= Daniel Schmutz =

Swiss administrator and politician (1943–2022)

Member of the Council of State of Vaud
- In office 5 May 1981 – 20 April 1998
- Preceded by: André Gavillet
- Succeeded by: Francine Jeanprêtre

Personal details
- Born: 6 June 1943 La Tour-de-Peilz, Switzerland
- Died: 29 October 2022 (aged 79)
- Party: PS
- Education: University of Lausanne
- Occupation: Administrator

Daniel Schmutz (6 June 1943 – 29 October 2022) was a Swiss administrator and politician. He was a member of the Swiss Socialist Party (PS).

== Biography ==
Schmutz earned a degree in economics and political science from the University of Lausanne. He first worked as an assistant to the chairman of political economy at HEC Lausanne. He was also employed at the Federal Statistical Office from 1967 to 1968, secretary-general of the Union Fruitière Vaudoise from 1968 to 1973, and secretary-general of the Fédération Vaudoise des Caisses-Maladie from 1974 to 1981.

Schmutz was elected to the Council of State of Vaud on 29 March 1981 and took office on 5 May. From 5 May 1981 to 9 March 1982, he headed the Department of Finance. For the entirety of his term of office, he led the Department of Public Works, and headed the Department of Social Welfare and Insurance from 5 April 1982 to 31 December 1991. He left the Council of State on 20 April 1998.

Schmutz was a member of the board of directors of Romande Energie Holding from 1992 to 2013 and became a director of EOS Holding in 2001. He also became treasurer of the synodal council of the Evangelical Reformed Church of the Canton of Vaud in 1998 and directed Retraites Populaires from 1997 to 2008.

Daniel Schmutz died on 29 October 2022, at the age of 79.
