= Hans Ulrich Baumberger =

Swiss politician (1932–2022)

- Baumberger in 1971

Member of the Council of States of Switzerland
- In office 1 December 1975 – 27 November 1983

Member of the Swiss National Council
- In office 29 November 1971 – 30 November 1975

Personal details
- Born: 7 April 1932 Herisau, Switzerland
- Died: 31 October 2022 (aged 90)
- Party: FDP
- Education: University of St. Gallen
- Occupation: Entrepreneur

Hans Ulrich Baumberger (7 April 1932 – 31 October 2022) was a Swiss entrepreneur and politician. A member of The Liberals, he served in the National Council from 1971 to 1975 and the Council of States from 1975 to 1983.

Baumberger died on 31 October 2022 at the age of 90.
