= 2022 in Germany =

- Decades: 2000s; 2010s; 2020s; 2030s
- See also: Other events of 2022; History of Germany • Timeline • Years

This article encompasses events from 2022 in Germany.

Germany's foreign policy and a significant extent of its domestic affairs have been directly or partially of a result of the Russian invasion of Ukraine. Under the leadership of Chancellor Olaf Scholz, whose first full calendar year in office was 2022, in conjunction with most of NATO's members and allies, Germany increased its defense budget and halted Nord Stream 2. The German government became a staunch supporter of Ukraine, with it only trailing Poland in receiving Ukrainian refugees between all allies of Ukraine; Germany also cut down on its imports of Russian energy and signed new LNG deals with both QatarEnergy and ConocoPhillips.

Domestically, Germany saw a population increase to 84 million, a record for the nation, mostly due to accepting a large number of refugees from Ukraine.

== Incumbents ==
- President: Frank-Walter Steinmeier
- Chancellor: Olaf Scholz
- Bundestag: 20th
- President of the Bundestag: Bärbel Bas
- Largest party in Bundestag: Social Democratic Party (SPD)

== Events ==
=== January ===
- 4 January – 2021–22 Tour de Ski ends.
- 6 January – 2021–22 Four Hills Tournament ends.
- 14–16 January – 2022 European Short Track Speed Skating Championships
- 24 January – Heidelberg University shooting
- 24–30 January – 2022 IBU Open European Championships
- 26–30 January – 2022 German Masters snooker tournament
- 28 January - Leader of the Alternative for Germany (AFD) Jörg Meuthen resigns from the AfD. He justified this with the fact that he had lost the power struggle with the formally dissolved right-wing extremist "Der Flügel" ("the wing") over the political direction of AfD. Meuthen criticized that the party had developed far to the right.
- 31 January – 2022 Kusel shooting; two officers are shot and killed at a traffic stop.

=== February ===
- 10–20 February – The 72nd Berlin International Film Festival is held; Carla Simón's film Alcarràs wins the top prize.
- 13 February – The 2022 German presidential election: Frank-Walter Steinmeier is re-elected.
- 17 February – The 58th Munich Security Conference is held.

=== March ===
- 27 March – 2022 Saarland state election: The SPD wins a landslide victory.

=== April ===
- 21 April – 1 May – 2022 IIHF World U18 Championships
- 25 April – Anke Rehlinger is elected Minister-President of Saarland by the Landtag.

=== May ===
- 8 May – 2022 Schleswig-Holstein state election; the CDU wins in a landslide while the SDP suffers a blowout loss and is reduced to the third largest party.
- 15 May – 2022 North Rhine-Westphalia state election; the CDU remains as the largest party while The Greens nearly triple their vote share and become the state's third largest party.

=== June ===
- 3 June
  - Garmisch-Partenkirchen train derailment
  - The Bundestag approves a special defense fund of €100 billion for the Bundeswehr in response to the Russian invasion of Ukraine.
- 3–5 June – 2022 Judo Grand Slam Düsseldorf
- 8 June – The 2022 Berlin car attack kills one and injures 17 others.
- 18 June – Documenta fifteen starts.
- 26-28 June – 48th G7 summit

=== August ===
- 11–21 August – 2022 European Championships

=== September ===
- 1 September – Poland's Jarosław Kaczyński, leader of the Law and Justice party, announced the Polish government's intent to officially demand that the German government pay 6.2 trillion zł in World War II reparations.

=== October ===
- 9 October – 2022 Lower Saxony state election. The SPD expanded its plurality in the state's Landtag by two seats.

=== December ===
- 2 December – 2022 FIFA World Cup: the German men's football national team, despite defeating Costa Rica 4–2, is knocked out of the World Cup due to Japan's upset win over Spain.
- 7 December – 2022 Germany coup d'état plot: German police arrest 25 members of the Reichsbürger movement accused of planning a coup d'état.
- 16 December – The AquaDom aquarium in Berlin, Germany, home to 1,500 tropical fish of more than 100 different species, bursts, flooding local streets. The majority of the fish die during the incident, and two people are injured.
- 17 December – Dresden Green Vault burglary: German authorities recover 31 royal jewellery items that were stolen from the Green Vault museum at Dresden Castle in Dresden, Saxony, Germany, in 2019.

== Deaths ==
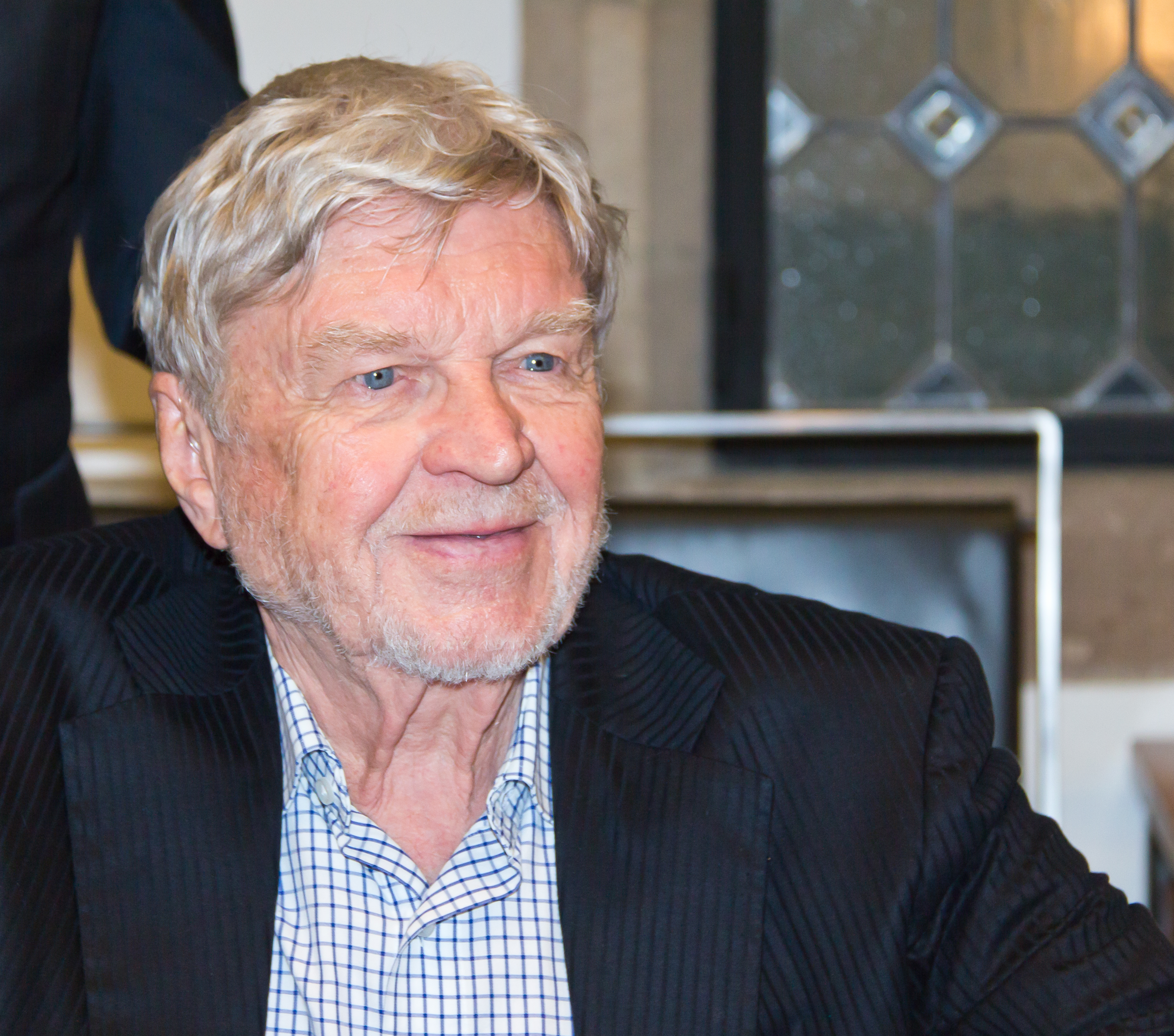
Hardy Krüger

=== January ===
- 1 January – Andreas Kunz, German Nordic combined athlete (b. 1946)
- 7 January – Eberhard Heinrich Zeidler, German-Canadian architect (b. 1926)
- 10 January – Ali Mitgutsch, German author of picture books and a professional advertising Illustrator (b. 1935)
- 19 January
  - Hans-Jürgen Dörner, German footballer (b. 1951)
  - Hardy Krüger, German actor (b. 1928)
- 20 January – Heidi Biebl, German alpine skier (b. 1941)
- 22 January – Hartmut Becker, German actor (b. 1938)
- 31 January – Ekkehardt Belle, German television actor (b. 1954)

=== February ===
- 3 February – Dieter Mann, German actor, director, university professor, and radio personality (b. 1941)
- 15 February – Peter Merseburger, German journalist and author (b. 1928)

=== March ===
- 10 March – Jürgen Grabowski, German football player (b. 1944)
- 12 March – Gertraud Gruber, German beautician and businesswoman (b. 1922)
- 16 March – Egidius Braun, German football administrator (b. 1926)
- 31 March – Günter Deckert, German Far-right political activist and the leader of National Democratic Party of Germany (NPD). (b. 1940)

=== April ===
- 8 April – Uwe Bohm, German actor (b. 1962)

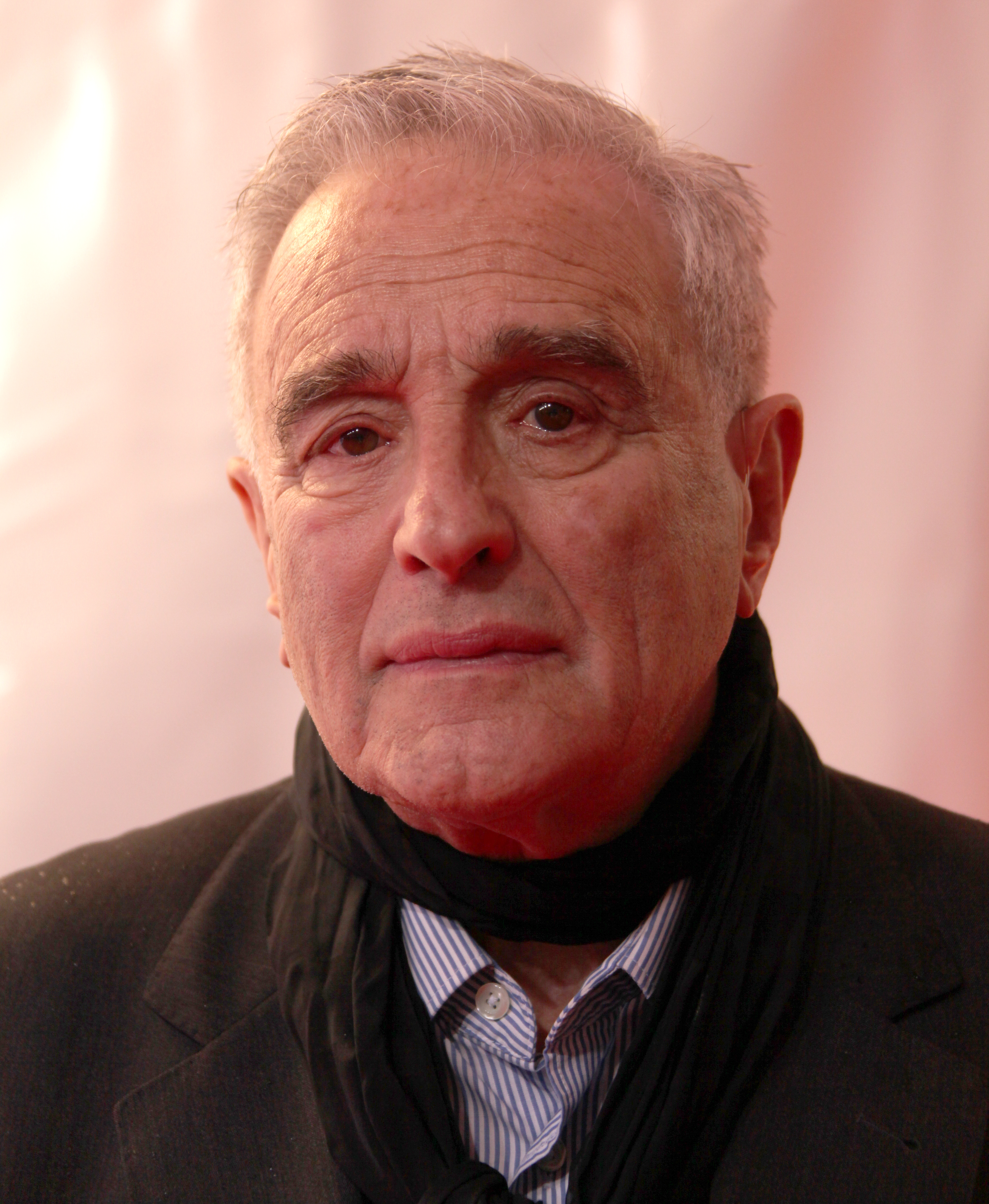
Michael Degen

- 9 April – Michael Degen, German actor (1932)
- 15 April – Bernhard Germeshausen, German bobsledder (1951)
- 16 April – Joachim Streich, German football player (b. 1951)
- 25 April – Ursula Lehr, German politician, minister for youth, women, family and health (b. 1930)
- 26 April – Klaus Schulze, German electronic music pioneer, composer and musician (b. 1941)

=== May ===
- 15 May – Rainer Basedow, German actor (b. 1938)
- 28 May – Marion van de Kamp, German actress (b. 1925)

=== June ===
- 4 June – Frank Hoffmann, actor (b. 1938)
- 5 June – Jürgen Möllemann, German politician (b. 1945)
- 7 June – Carl, Duke of Württemberg, German royal, head of the House of Württemberg since 1975 (b. 1936)
- 11 June
  - Bernd Bransch, German footballer and Olympic champion (b. 1944)
  - Peter Reusse, actor (b. 1941)
- 17 June – Margot von Renesse, politician (SPD) (b. 1940)
- 23 June – Ernst Jacobi, actor (b. 1933)
- 25 June – Bernhard Wessel, football player (b. 1936)

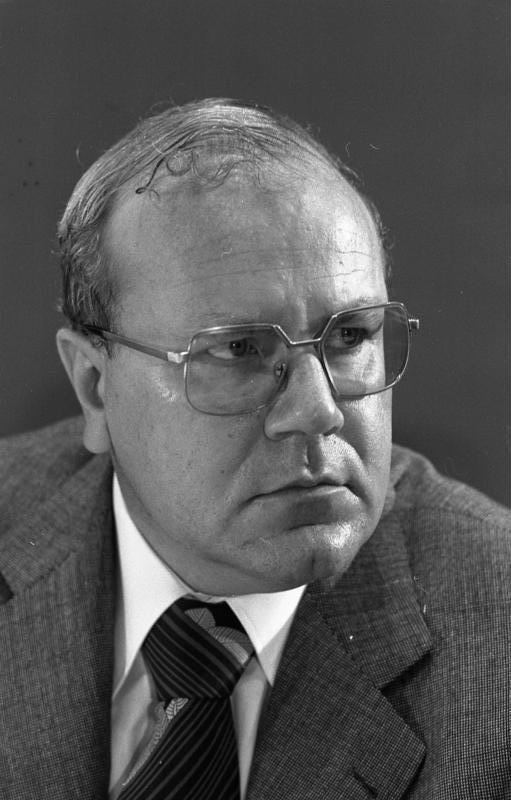
Martin Bangemann

- 28 June
  - Martin Bangemann, politician (FDP), (b. 1934)
  - Katja Husen, politician (b. 1976)
  - Peter von der Osten-Sacken, lutheran theologian (b. 1940)
- 29 June – Manfred Krafft, football player(b. 1937)
- 30 June – William Cohn, actor (b. 1957)

=== July ===
- 9 July – Alois Schätzle, politician (b. 1925)
- 13 July – Dieter Wedel, film director (b. 1939)

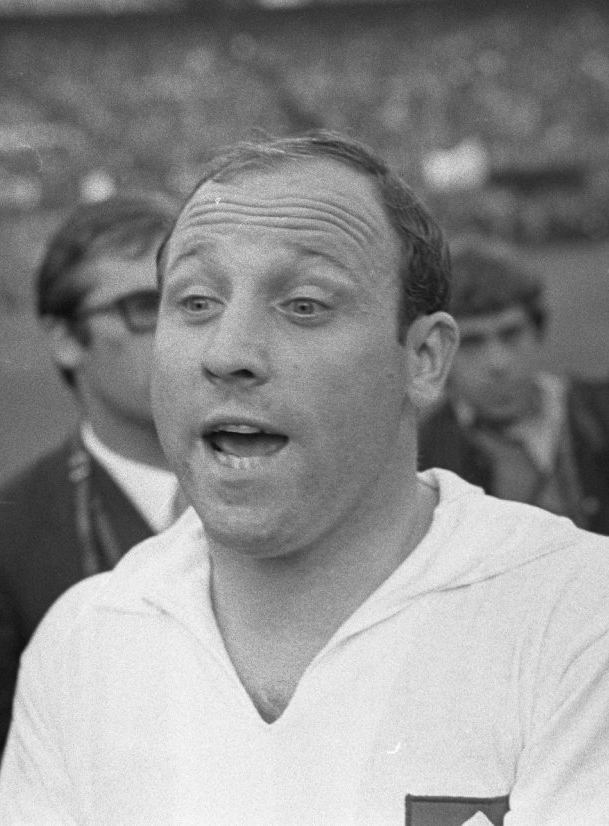
Uwe Seeler

- 14 July – Jürgen Heinsch, footballer (b. 1940)
- 19 July – Dieter Helm, politician (b. 1941)
- 21 July – Uwe Seeler, footballer (b. 1936)
- 29 July
  - Sybille Benning, politician (b. 1961)
  - Margot Eskens, singer (b. 1936)
- 31 July – Maria Frisé, journalist and author (b. 1926)

=== August ===
- 5 August – Peter Schowtka, politician (b. 1945)
- 7 August – Eike Christian Hirsch, journalist and author (b. 1937)
- 9 August – Heinz Behrens, actor (b. 1932)

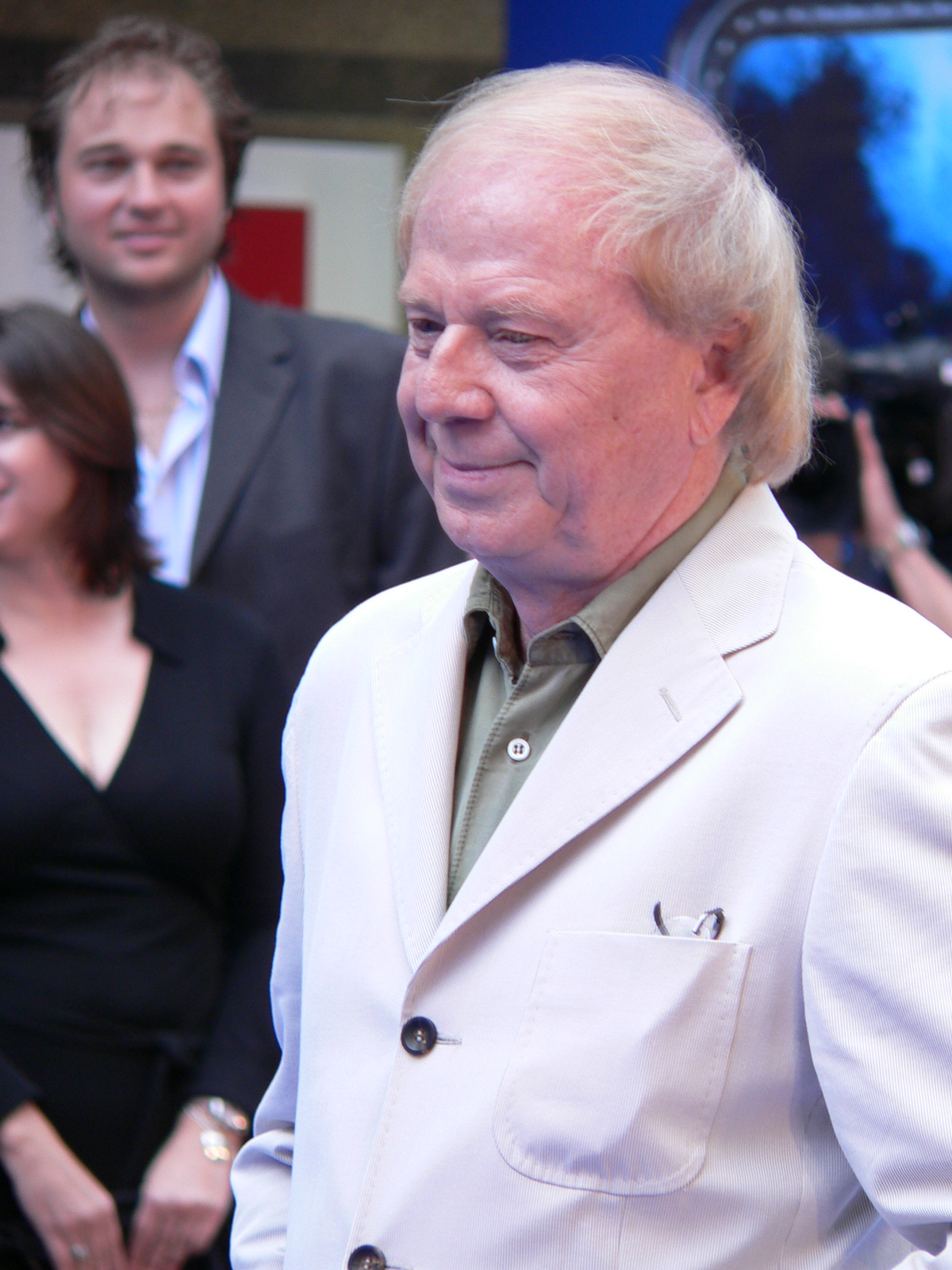
Wolfgang Petersen

- 12 August – Wolfgang Petersen, film director and film producer (b. 1941)
- 16 August – Eva-Maria Hagen, actress and singer (b. 1934)
- 17 August – Hellmut Flashar, philologist, translator and medicine historian (b. 1929)
- 18 August – Rolf Kühn, jazz clarinetist and saxophonist (b. 1929)
- 20 August – Franz Hummel, composer (b. 1939)
- 22 August – Theo Sommer, journalist (b. 1930)
- 29 August – Hans-Christian Ströbele, politician (b. 1939)

=== September ===
- 4 September – Heidemarie Fischer, politician (b. 1944)
- 7 September – Dagmar Schipanski, politician (b. 1943)
- 11 September – Roland Reber, actor, theatre director and producer (b. 1954)

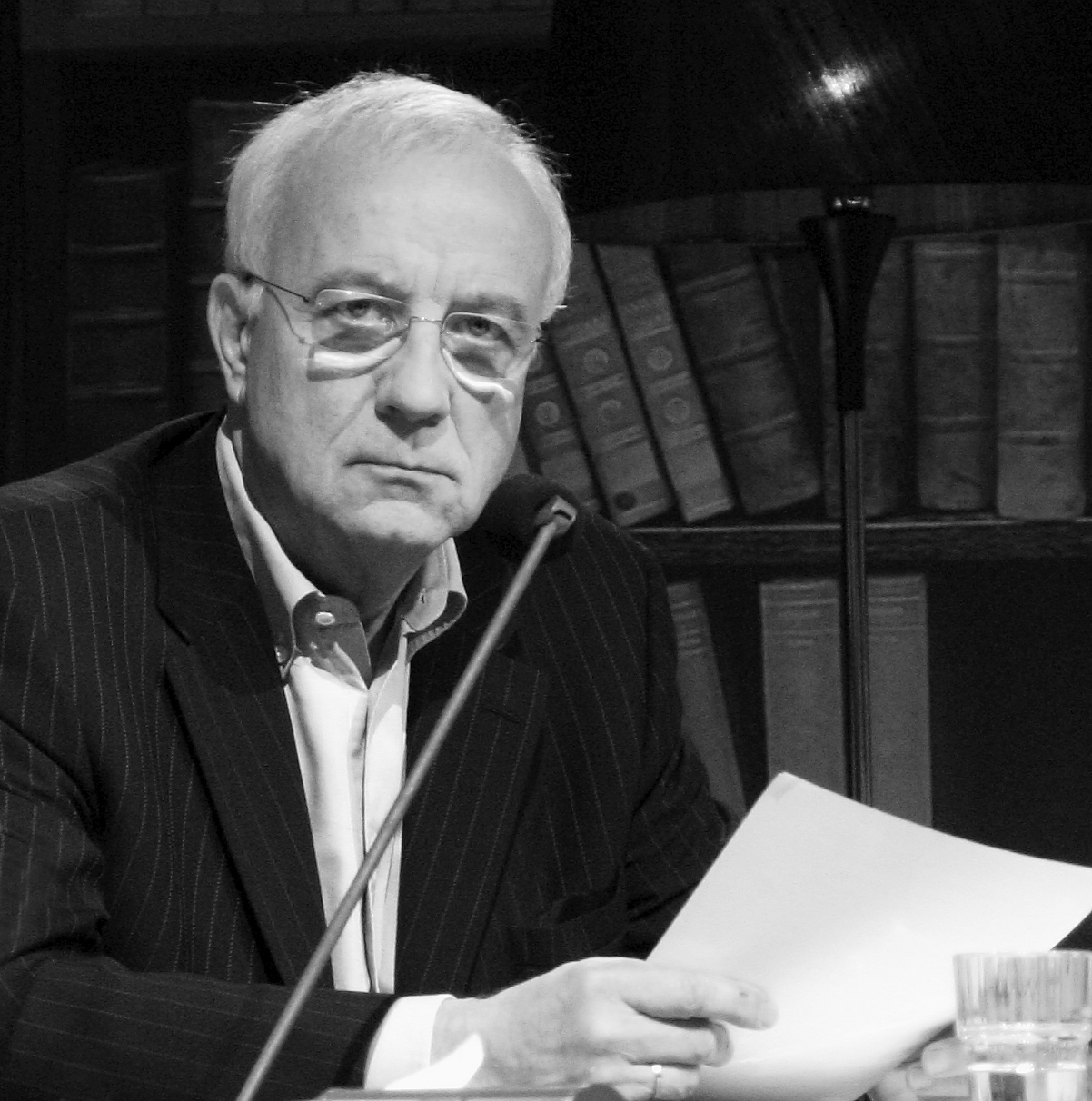
Fritz Pleitgen

- 15 September – Fritz Pleitgen, television journalist and author (b. 1938)
- 22 September – Rainer Keller, politician (b. 1965)
- 24 September
  - Manfred Degen, politician (b. 1939)
  - Helmut Wilhelm, judge and politician (b. 1946)
- 27 September – Prince Ferfried of Hohenzollern, member of the princely House of Hohenzollern-Sigmaringen and champion race car driver (b. 1943)

=== October ===
- 4 October
  - Günter Lamprecht, actor (b. 1930)
  - Jürgen Sundermann, football player and manager (b. 1940)
- 5 October
  - Barbara Stamm, politician (b. 1944)
  - Wolfgang Kohlhaase, film director (b. 1931)
- 14 October
  - Ralf Wolter, actor (b. 1926)
  - Georg Scholz, politician (b. 1958)
- 15 October – Horst Metz, politician (b. 1945)
- 17 October
  - Heinz-Jörg Eckhold, politician (b. 1941)
  - Michael Ponti, pianist (b. 1937)
  - Franz Vorrath, Roman Catholic prelate (b. 1937)
- 20 October – Helmut Kuhlmann, politician (b. 1940)
- 21 October
  - Wolfgang Jenssen, politician (b. 1942)
  - Rainer Schaller, entrepreneur (b. 1969)
- 23 October
  - Walter Gaudnek, artist (b. 1931)
  - Benno Zech, politician (b. 1928)
- 24 October – Dieter Werkmüller, lawyer (b. 1937)
- 26 October – Sebastian von Rotenhan, politician (b. 1949)
- 28 October
  - Wolfgang Bordel, theatre manager (b. 1951)
  - Hannah Pick-Goslar, Holocaust survivor (b. 1928)
- 29 October
  - Wolfgang Lange, Olympic canoeist (b. 1938)
  - Heinrich Schneier, politician (b. 1925)
- 30 October – Rosemarie Köhn, Christian minister (b. 1939)

=== November ===
- 2 November – Michael Möllenbeck, Olympic discus thrower (b. 1969)
- 3 November
  - Peter Danckert, politician (b. 1940)
  - Gerd Dudek, saxophonist (b. 1938)
- 6 November – Sig Ohlemann, Olympic runner (b. 1938)
- 9 November
  - Hans-Joachim Klein, political militant (b. 1947)
  - Werner Schulz, politician (b. 1950)
- 12 November – Klaus Peter Sauer, evolutionary biologist and ecologist (b. 1941)
- 14 November – Werner Franke, biologist (b. 1940)
- 18 November – Manfred Palmen, politician (b. 1945)

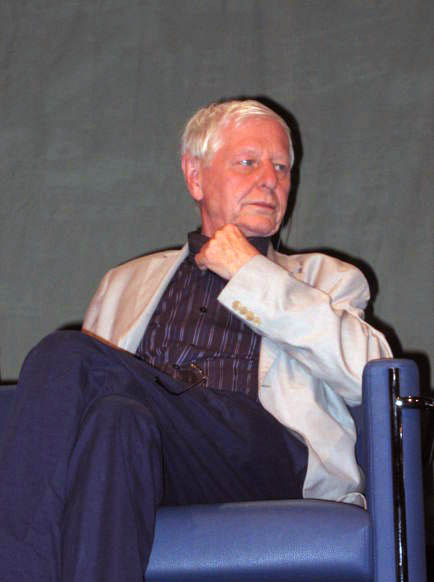
Hans Magnus Enzensberger

- 24 November
  - Chanoch Ehrentreu, German-born English rabbi (b. 1932)
  - Hans Magnus Enzensberger, author, poet, translator and editor (b. 1929)
- 26 November – Jens Bullerjahn, politician (b. 1962)
- 27 November – Hans Zehetmair, politician (b. 1936)

=== December ===
- 3 December
  - Dietmar Kuegler, publisher and author (b. 1951)
  - Alfons Vogtel, politician (b. 1952)
- 4 December – Manuel Göttsching, musician (b. 1952)
- 5 December – Bernd Rohr, cyclist (b. 1937)
- 7 December
  - Bernhard Brinkmann, politician (b. 1952)
  - Jann-Peter Janssen, politician (b. 1945)
- 8 December – Aldona Gustas, author (b. 1932)
- 11 December – Wolf Erlbruch, illustrator and writer of children books (b. 1948)
- 12 December
  - Hermann Nuber, footballer (b. 1935)
  - Wolfgang Ziffer, actor (b. 1941)
- 14 December
  - Volker Eid, Roman-catholic theologian and author (b. 1940)
  - Wulf Kirsten, writer, poet and novelist (b. 1934)
  - Sybil Gräfin Schönfeldt, author and writer (b. 1927)
- 16 December – Klaus Mayer, Roman-catholic priest and author (b. 1923)
- 17 December
  - Werner Leich, lutheran bishop (b. 1927)
  - Dieter Henrich, philosopher (b. 1927)
  - Marie-Luise Scherer, author and journalist (b. 1938)
- 18 December – Manfred Messerschmidt, historian (b. 1926)
- 19 December – Erwin Josef Ender, prelate of Roman Catholic Church (b. 1937)
- 20 December – Barbara Noack, author (b. 1924)
- 21 December –Hartmut Holzapfel, politician (b. 1944)
- 26 December
  - Michael Fuchs, politician (b. 1949)
  - Konrad Kruis, lawyer (b. 1930)
- 29 December – Maximilian, Margrave of Baden, aristocrat (b. 1933)
- 31 December – Benedict XVI, Pope (2005–2013) and archbishop of Munich and Freising (1977–1982).
