= Osteiner Hof =

Palace in Mainz, Rhineland-Palatinate, Germany

Coordinates: 49°59′50″N 8°16′5″E

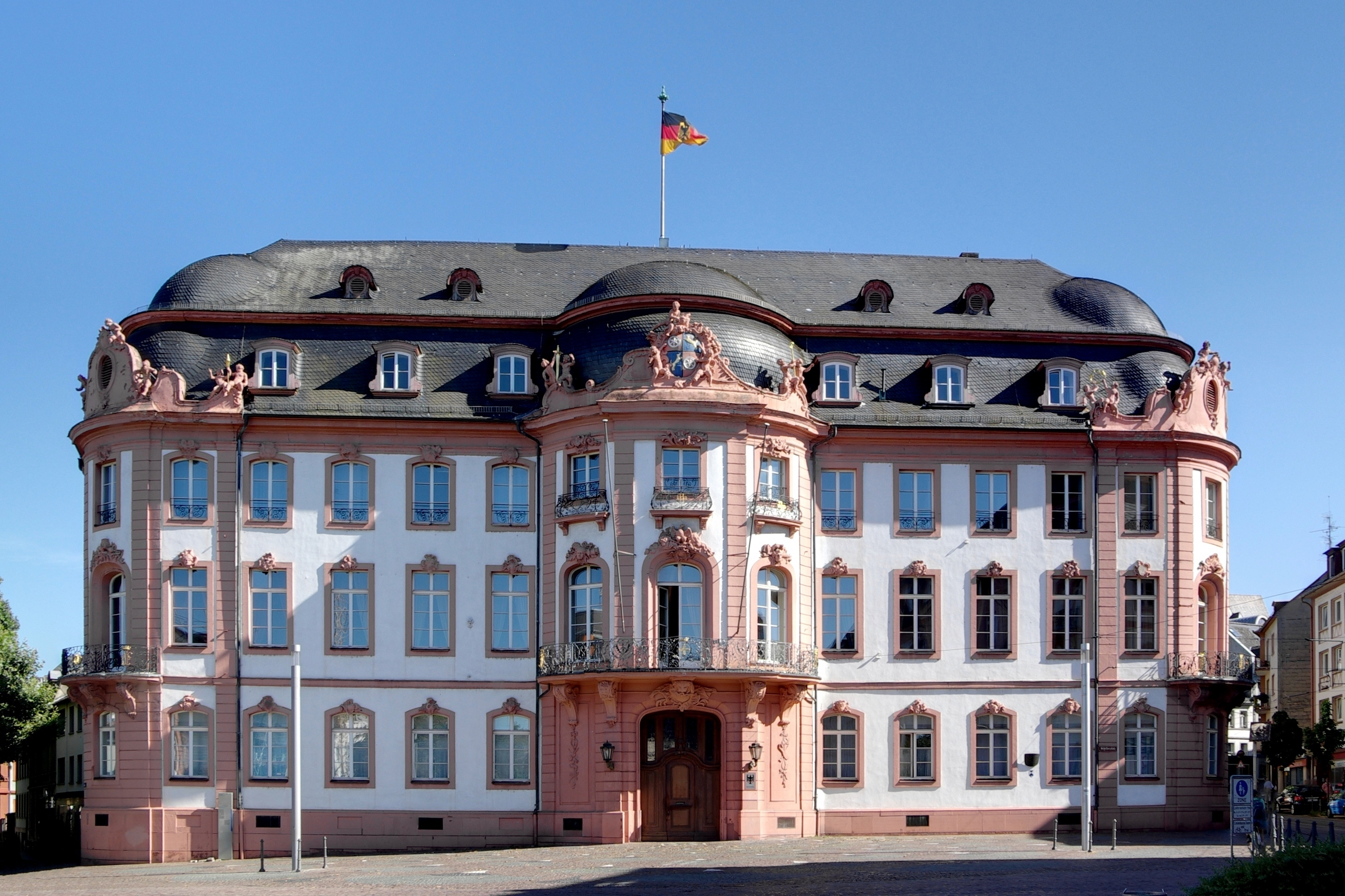
The Osteiner Hof

The Osteiner Hof ("Court of Ostein") is one of several Baroque-era palatial mansions along Schillerplatz square in the German city of Mainz. The mansion, along the southern edge of the square, was built in 1747-1752 by architect-soldier Johann Valentin Thomann for Franz Wolfgang Damian von Ostein, brother of Johann Friedrich Karl von Ostein, who was prince-bishop of Mainz at that time.

Characteristic features for this building are the three round protrusions (risalits) at the front entrance and on the two corners. The building is lavishly decorated; for instance, the windows are framed by rococo-style cartouches symbolising the elements of air, earth and water. The classical gods Diana and Mars are shown on the cartouches framing the balcony doors.

The von Osteins, a dynasty of counts, were not able to make use of the mansion for very long. After the left bank of the Rhine was occupied by French Revolutionary armies, the mansion was appropriated by the state, and in 1798 it became the seat of a newly created département of France, Mont-Tonnerre.

The building continued to be used as a seat of government after the Napoleonic era, even gaining the nickname Gouvernement during the years 1854-1859, while emperor-to-be Wilhelm I was serving as military governor of Mainz. During the early days of the Franco-Prussian War (1870–1871), the Osteiner Hof served as military headquarters of a Prussian field marshal, Prince Frederick Charles of Prussia.

In 1914, then-military governor General Hugo von Kathen announced the start of World War I to the Mainz populace from the balcony of the Osteiner Hof. The mansion was destroyed by fire during World War II, but was restored in 1947-1948. From 1958 until 2014, the Osteiner Hof was in use by the Bundeswehr as military headquarters and officers' mess.

The Osteiner Hof plays an important part in the local carnival traditions. Every year, on 11 November at 11 past 11, the start of the carnival season is proclaimed from the balcony of the mansion.

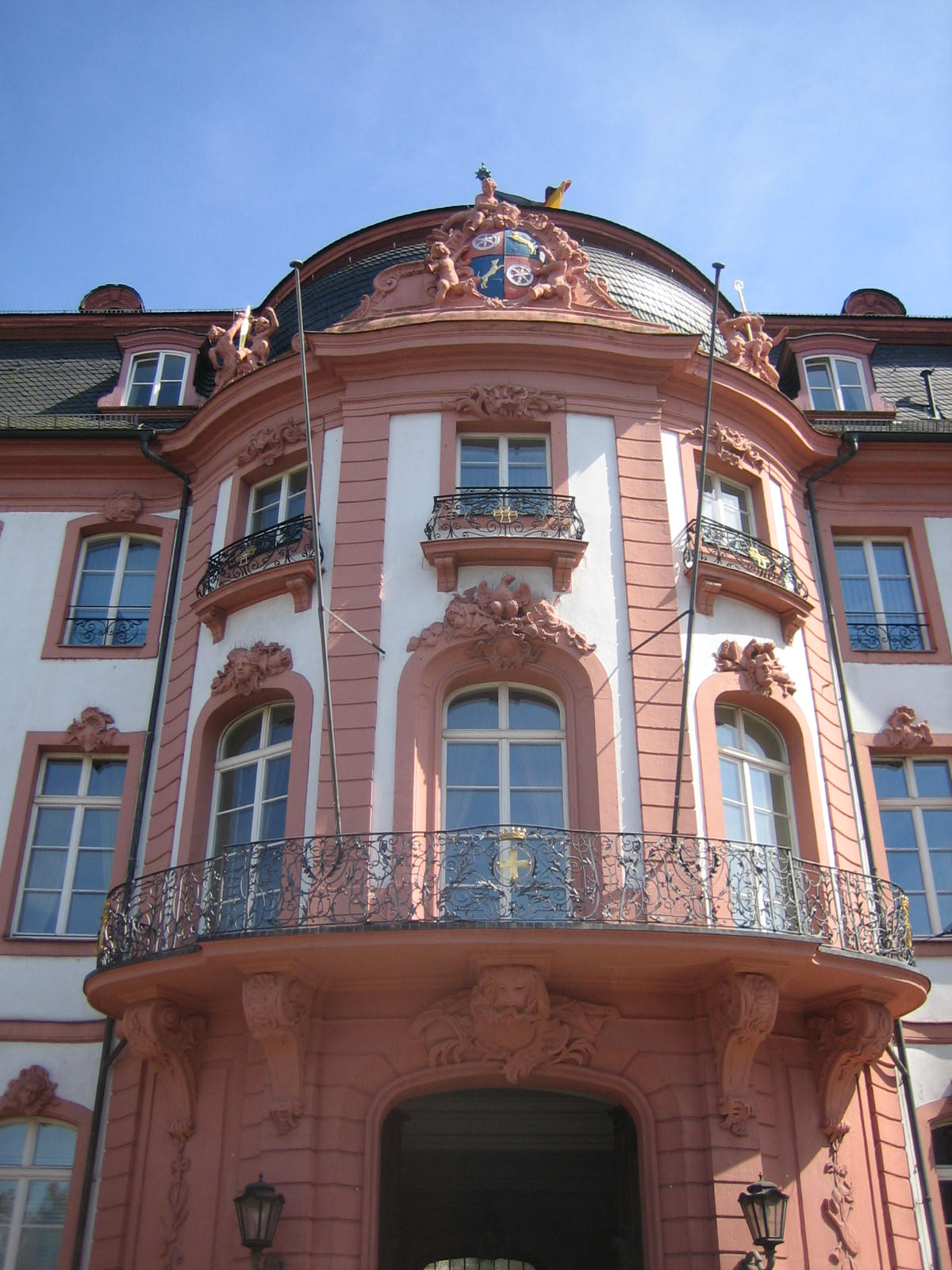
The central risalit on the facade

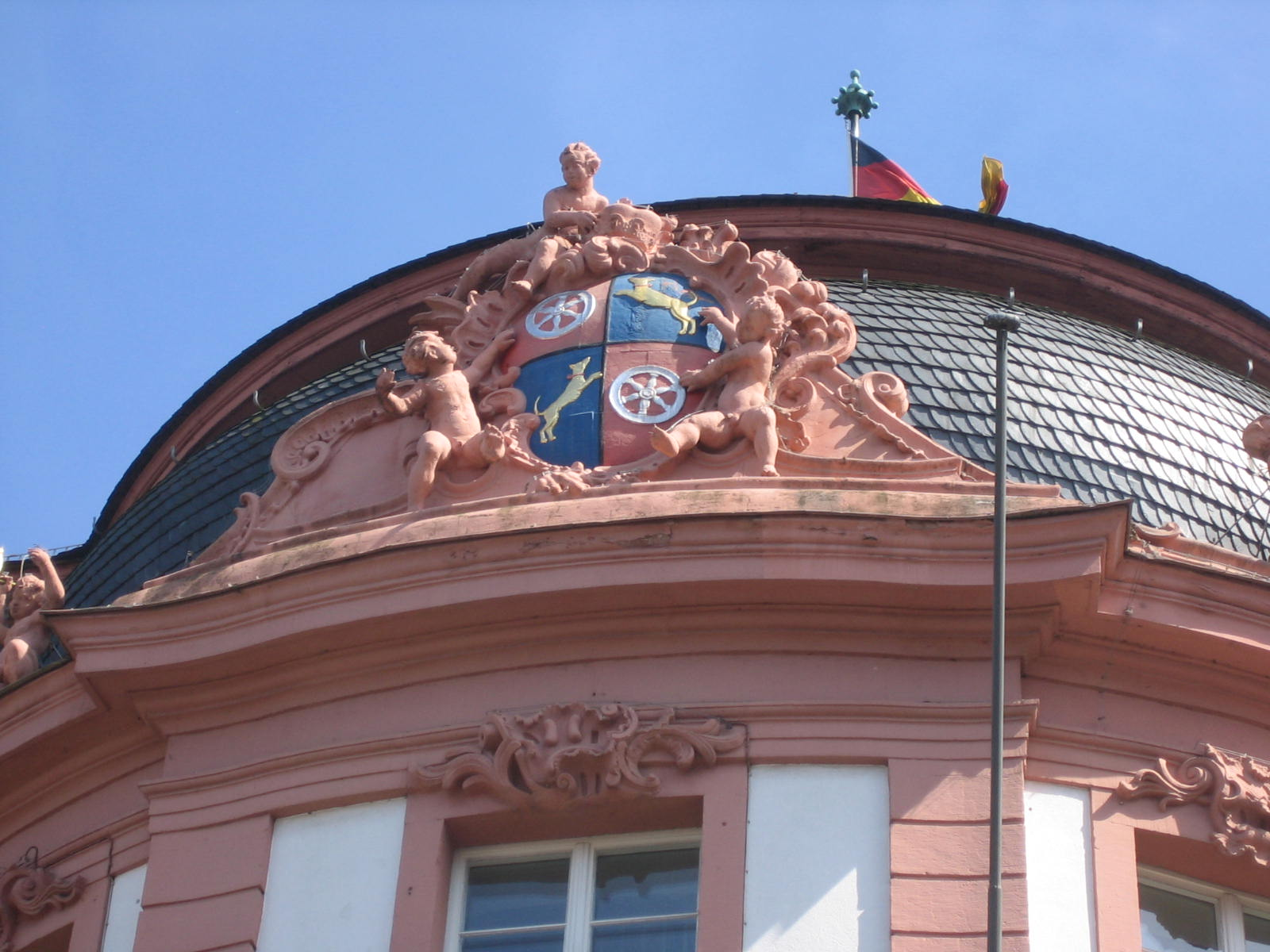
Coat of arms of the Ostein dynasty, framing the central risalit on the facade

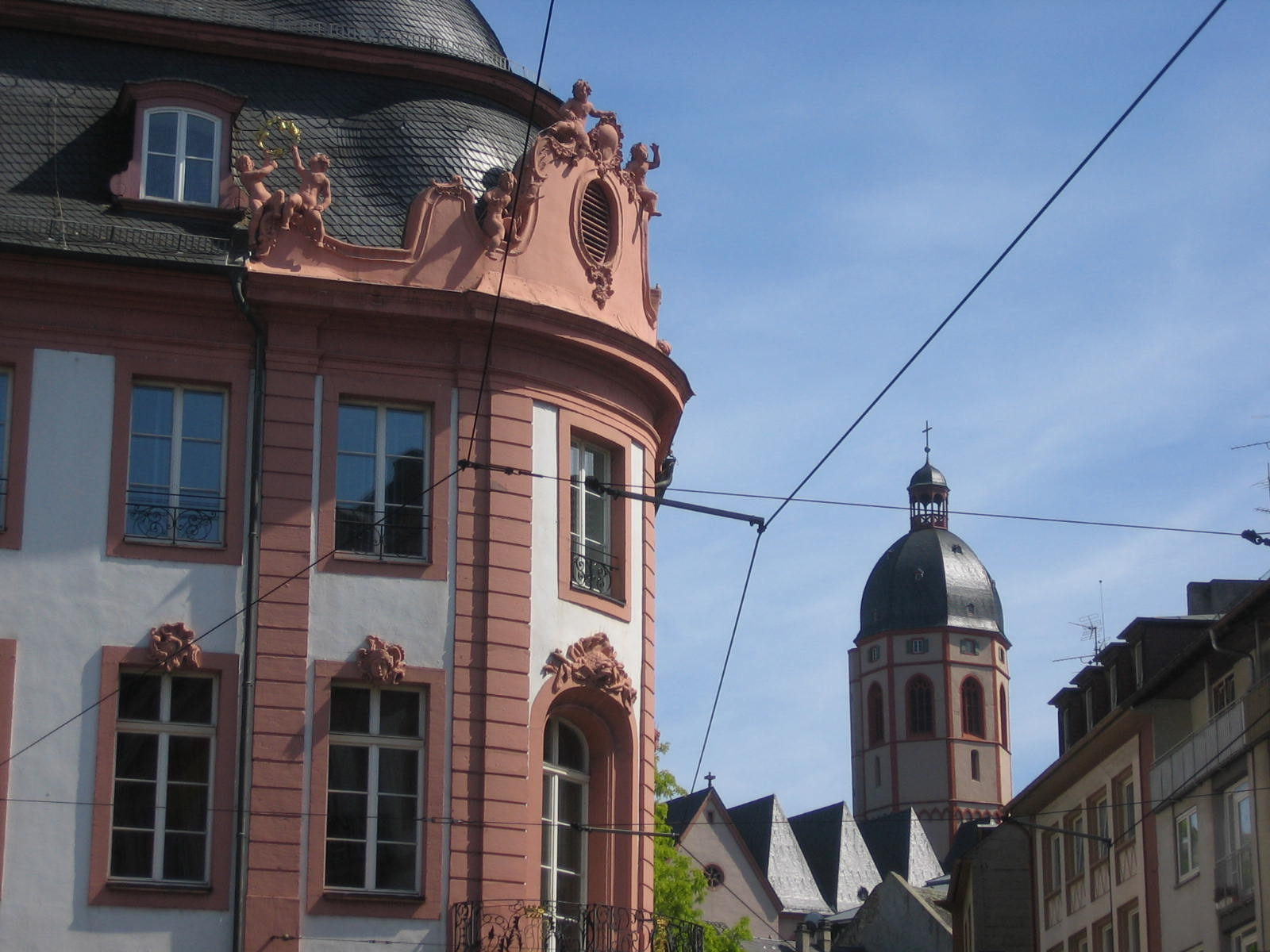
The Osteiner Hof with a view of the St. Stephan's Church

== Sources ==
- Landeshauptstadt Mainz: Historisches Mainz: Der Osteiner Hof (German)
