= Georg Scholz (disambiguation) =

Georg Scholz was a German painter.

Other people with this name include:

- Georg Scholz (ice hockey) (born 1937), German ice hockey player
- Georg Scholz (politician) (1958–2022), German politician
