= Avant-corps =

Protruding part of a building

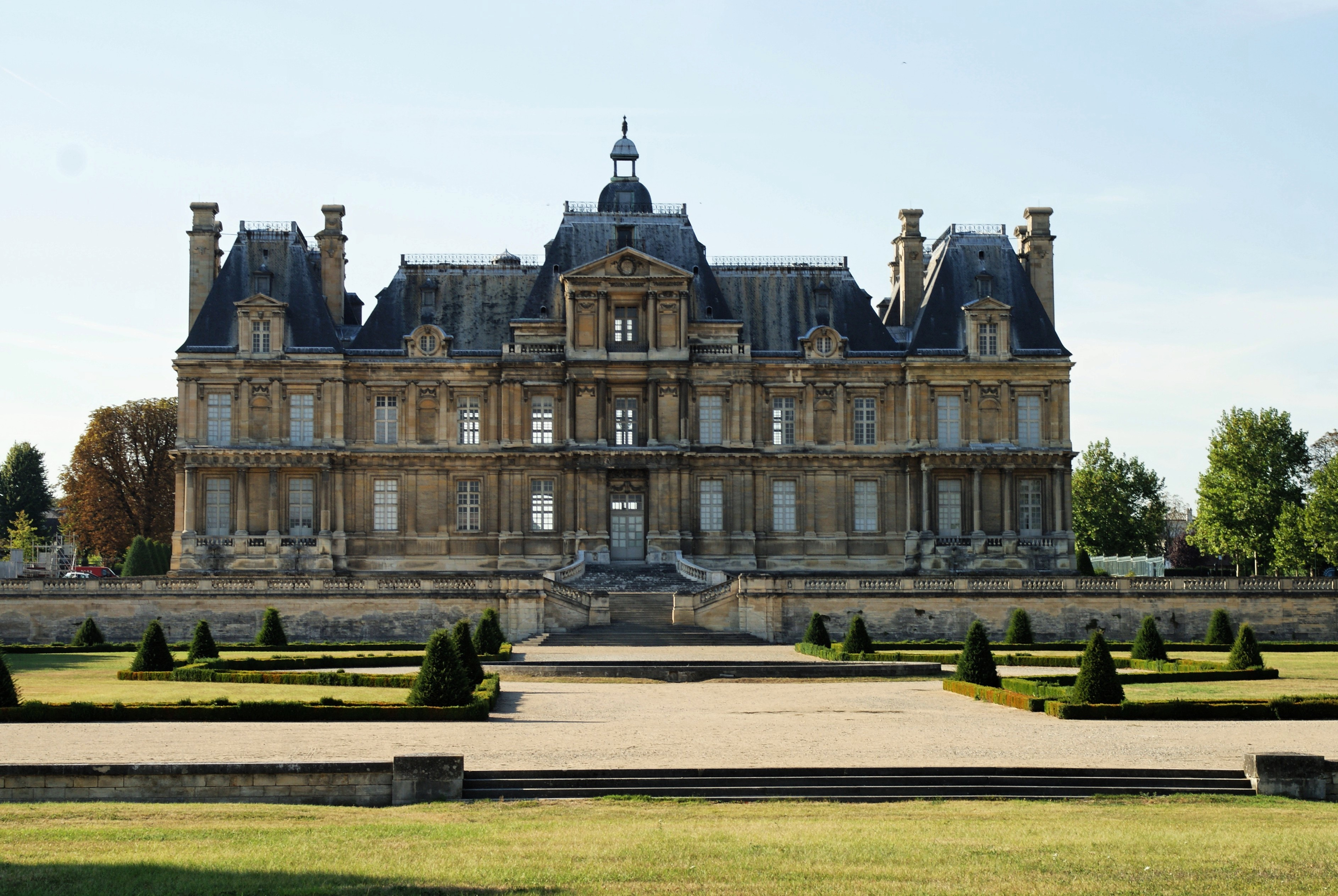
The garden façade of the Château de Maisons-Laffitte with three avant-corps, an arrangement typical of French Baroque châteaux

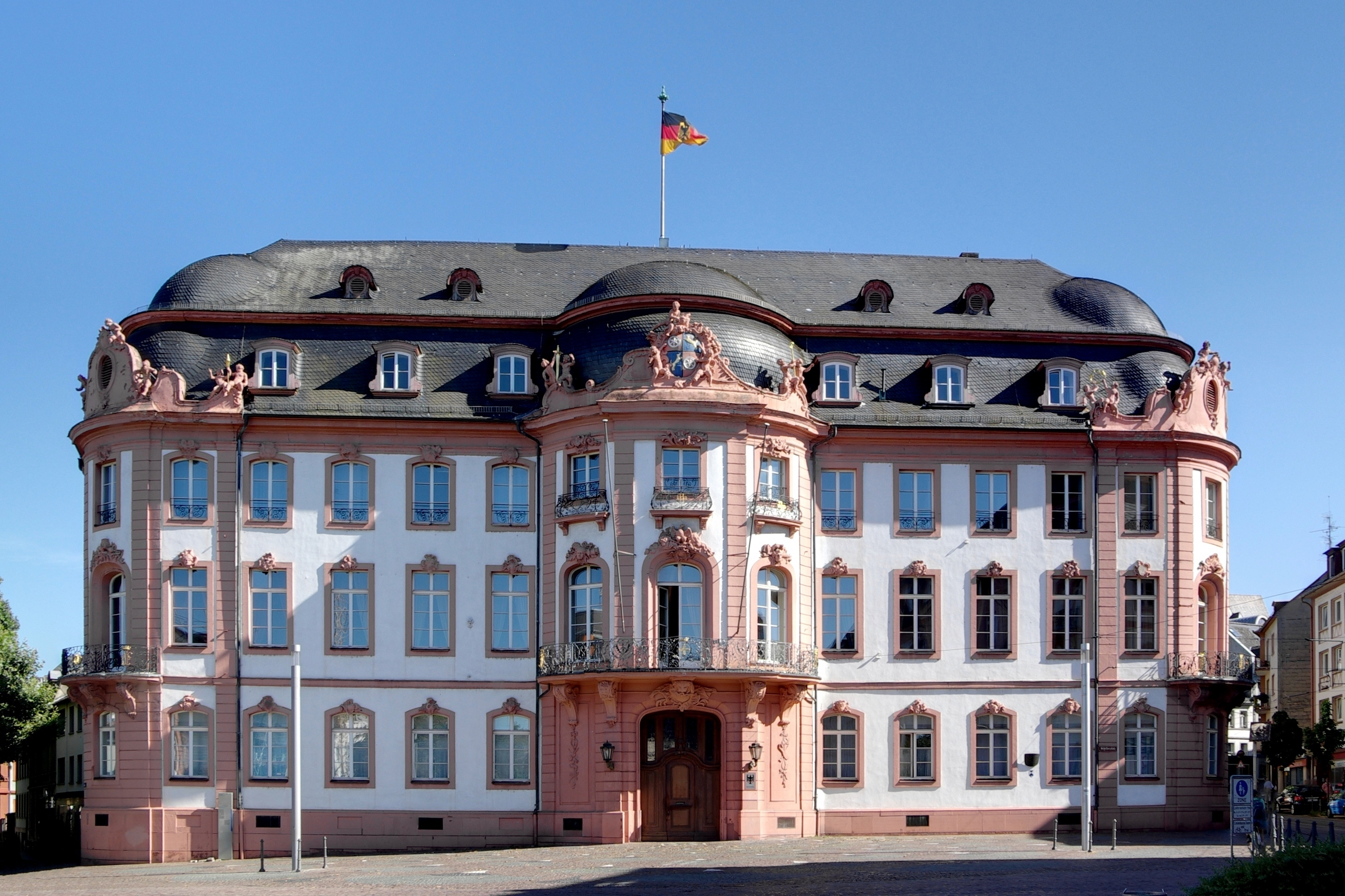
The Osteiner Hof in Mainz with three avant-corps

An avant-corps (Italian: avancorpo or risalto, plural risalti, German: Risalit, Polish: ryzalit), a French term literally meaning "fore-body", is a part of a building, such as a porch or pavilion, that juts out from the corps de logis, often taller than other parts of the building. It is common in façades in French Baroque architecture.

Particularly in German architecture, a corner Risalit is where two wings meet at right angles. Baroque three-winged constructions often incorporate a median Risalit in a main hall or a stairwell, such as in Weißenstein Palace and the Roßleben Convent School.

== Sources ==
Much of the text of this article comes from the equivalent German-language Wikipedia article retrieved on 18 March 2006.
