= Rabanus-Maurus-Gymnasium =

Rabanus Maurus Gymnasium
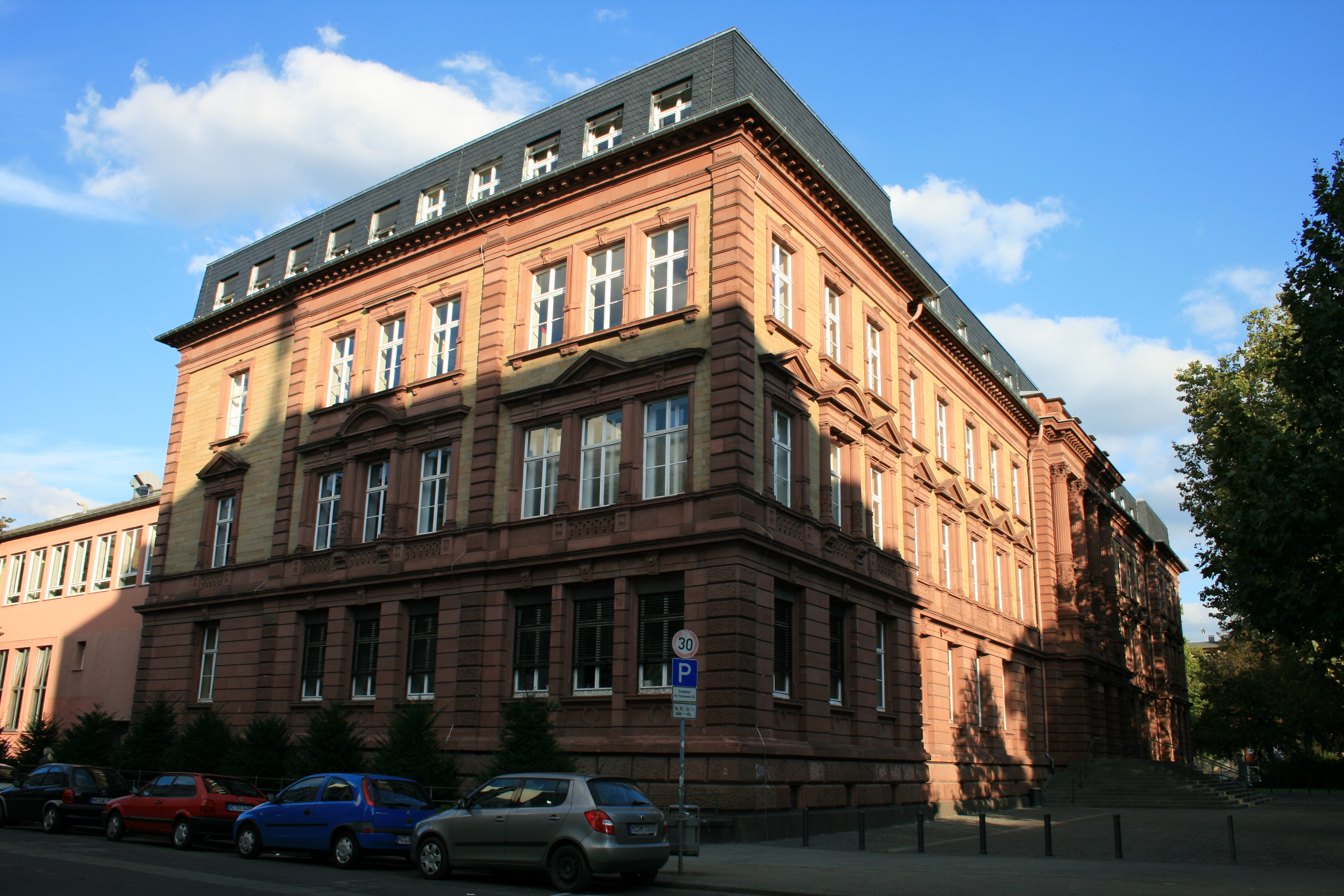
- Rabanus Maurus Gymnasium

Location
- 117er Ehrenhof 2 Mainz, Rhineland-Palatinate, 55118; Germany
- Coordinates: 50°0′26.71″N 8°15′54.72″E

Information
- School type: Gymnasium
- Founded: 1561
- Director: Dr. Ingo Schnell
- Enrollment: ~1200 (January 2019)
- Website: www.rama-mainz.de

The Rabanus-Maurus-Gymnasium is a classical gymnasium school in the Neustadt district of Mainz.

== Subjects ==
The Rabanus-Maurus-Gymnasium is a classical school. The first foreign language taught is Latin and the second is English. Later, three foreign languages (including ancient languages) are required.

== History ==
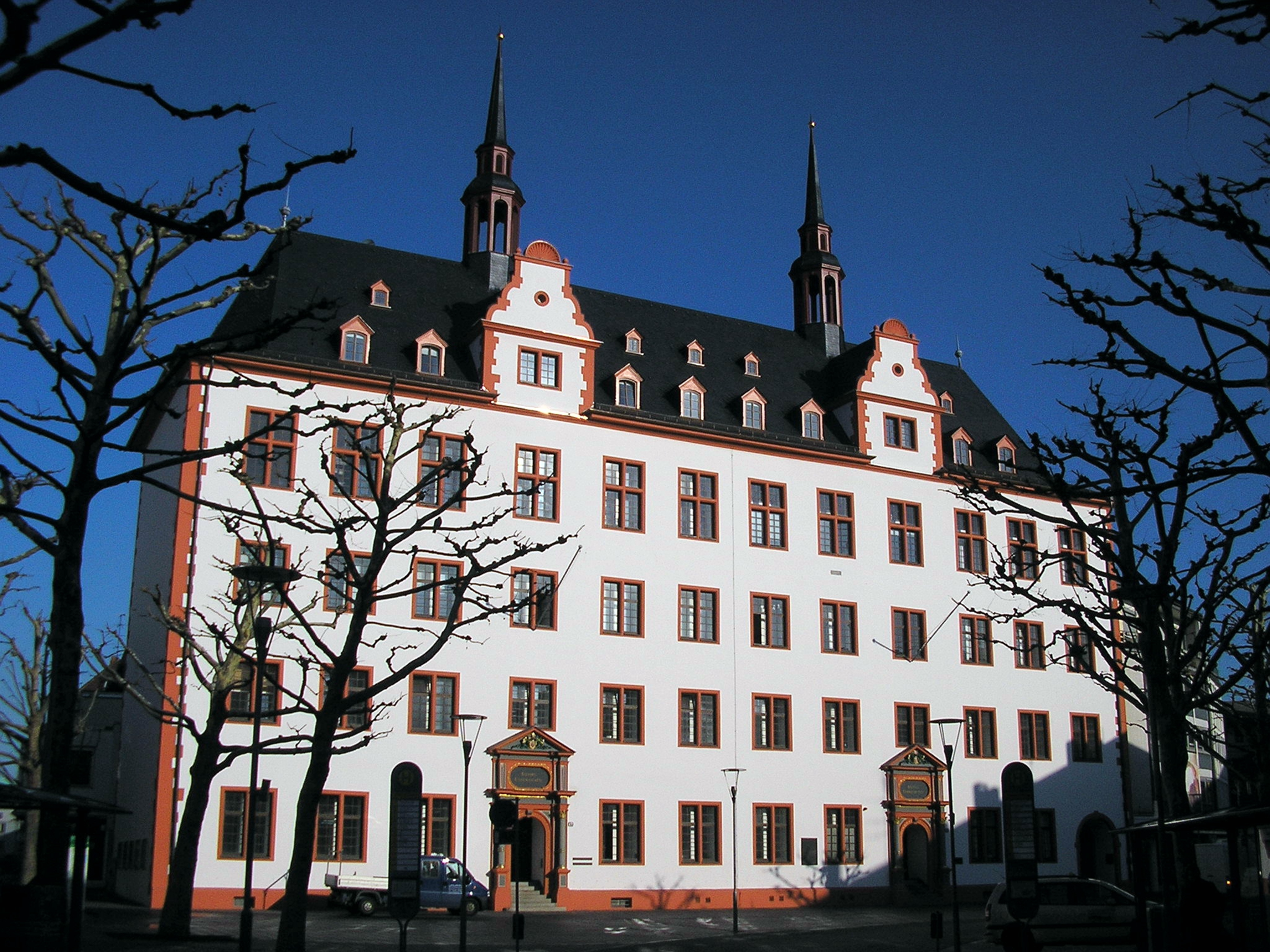
Domus Universitatis

The school was founded as a Jesuit school in Mainz on 9 December 1561 and was originally called the Kurfürstliches Kolleg der Gesellschaft Jesu (Prince-Electoral College of the Society of Jesus). Between 1618 and 1782 the school was co-located with the university in the Domus Universitatis. In 1773/1774, under the aegis of Emmerich Joseph von Breidbach zu Bürresheim, the school was reformed in line with the ideals of the Age of Enlightenment and was given the name Kurfürstlich Mainzisches Emmerizianisches Gymnasium (Prince-Electoral Mayencian Emmerichian Gymnasium). In the following 200 years, the school changed its name and location several times. In 1859 Heinrich Bone was made director of the school, at the behest of the Bishop of Mainz, Wilhelm Emmanuel Freiherr von Ketteler. In the course of the Kulturkampf, he was prematurely removed from office.

In 1945, the school building was destroyed by fire. In the following years, classes were held in what is now the Willigis Gymnasium . The director was August Mayer (1945–1958). The school moved back to the rebuilt school in the Kaiserstraße on 14 June 1953, and was renamed Rabanus-Maurus-Gymnasium, after Rabanus Maurus.

== Notable alumni ==
Year of graduation in parentheses

- Peter Paul Weinschenck aka Pablo Tabernero (1926) cinematographer
- Markus Antonietti (1978), chemist
- Fritz Arens (1931), art historian
- Werner Best (1921), leading Nazi
- Axel Börsch-Supan (1973), economist
- Gerold von Braunmühl (1955), diplomat, victim of the Red Army Faction
- Christoph Buchheim, (1973), economic historian
- Thomas Buchheim (1976), philosopher
- Susanne Gelhard (1976), journalist (ZDF)
- Johannes Gerster (1962), former member of federal parliament, president of the German Israeli Society
- Romano Guardini (1903), Catholic philosopher of religion and theologist
- Walter Hallstein (1920), German and European politician (1950s to 1970s)
- Adam Karrillon (1873), writer
- Klaus Mayer (1942), priest
- Anton Maria Keim (1948), local politician and writer
- Dorothea van der Koelen (1979), gallery owner and art historian
- Harald Martenstein (1972), journalist
- Ferdy Mayne (emigrated in the 1930s), film actor
- Eckhart Pick (1960), lawyer, former member of federal parliament and top civil servant
- Richard Ott (1947), Catholic priest and teacher
- Jürgen Rodeland (1979), organ expert
- Dorothea Schäfer (1981 as Dorothea Dittrich), member of Rhineland-Palatinate state parliament
- Jürgen Schölmerich (1967), physician and professor Hochschullehrer, vice president of the Deutsche Forschungsgemeinschaft
- Gerd Schreiner (1989), member of Rhineland-Palatinate state parliament
- Nanette Scriba (1978), chanson singer-songwriter
- Ulrike Syha (1995), playwright
- Stephan Wagner (1987), film director
- Carl Zuckmayer (1914), writer
