= Gerold Braunmühl =

West German diplomat

Gerold von Braunmühl (15 September 1935 – 10 October 1986) was a senior West German diplomat who was assassinated in 1986 by the German far-left guerrilla group, the Red Army Faction (RAF).

== Life and work ==
Gerold von Braunmühl came from a noble family of Swabian origin. Born in the then-German city of Breslau, he grew up in Mainz and attended the Rabanus-Maurus-Gymnasium. Braunmühl studied law at the University of Mainz and earned a doctorate in 1963. In 1964, he married Hilde, daughter of a professor of medicine at Alice Hospital in Mainz. Subsequently, he studied International Relations at the School of Advanced International Studies of Johns Hopkins University in Bologna (1964–1965) as well as at their main campus in Washington, DC (1965–1966), and graduated with a Master's degree.

== Activity in the Foreign Office ==
In 1966, Braunmühl joined the Foreign Service and worked as an attaché at the West German Embassy in Washington in 1967. In 1971, he joined the Unit for Germany and Berlin in the Bonn headquarters, where he eventually became Secretary to the closest advisors of Foreign Minister Hans-Dietrich Genscher. In 1985, he became the Head of Political Division II in charge of European Political Cooperation, the Western European Union, and NATO, as well as for relations with the Soviet bloc, so that he had become one of the most influential officials in the Foreign Office. Braunmühl was instrumental in improving relations with the Soviet Union and Poland, which had cooled since the ban of the Polish trade union movement. He was considered a likely candidate for the post of Secretary of State in the Foreign Office.

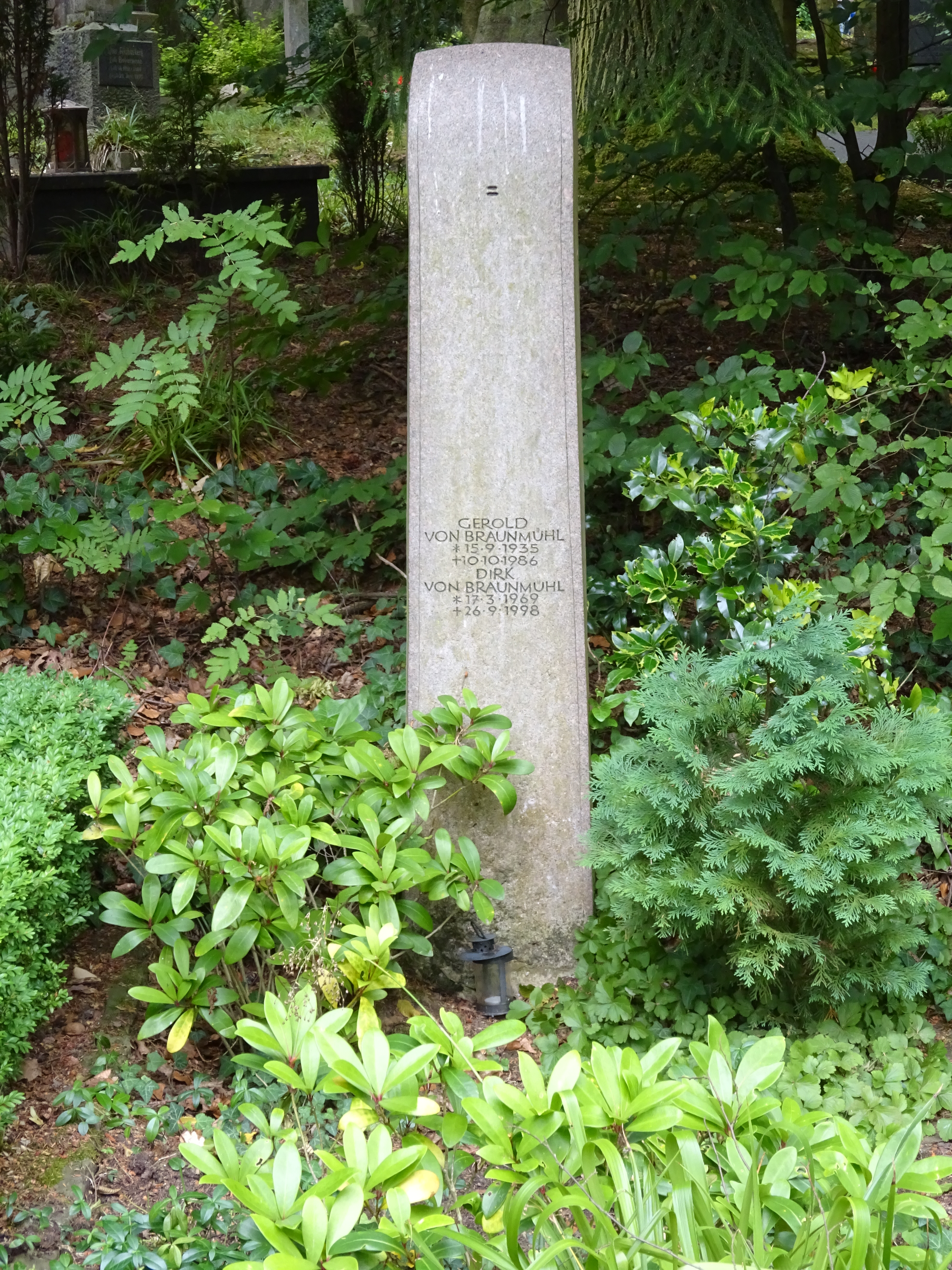
Gerold von Braunmühl, Dirk von Braunmühl, grave on the cemetery Bonn-Poppelsdorf

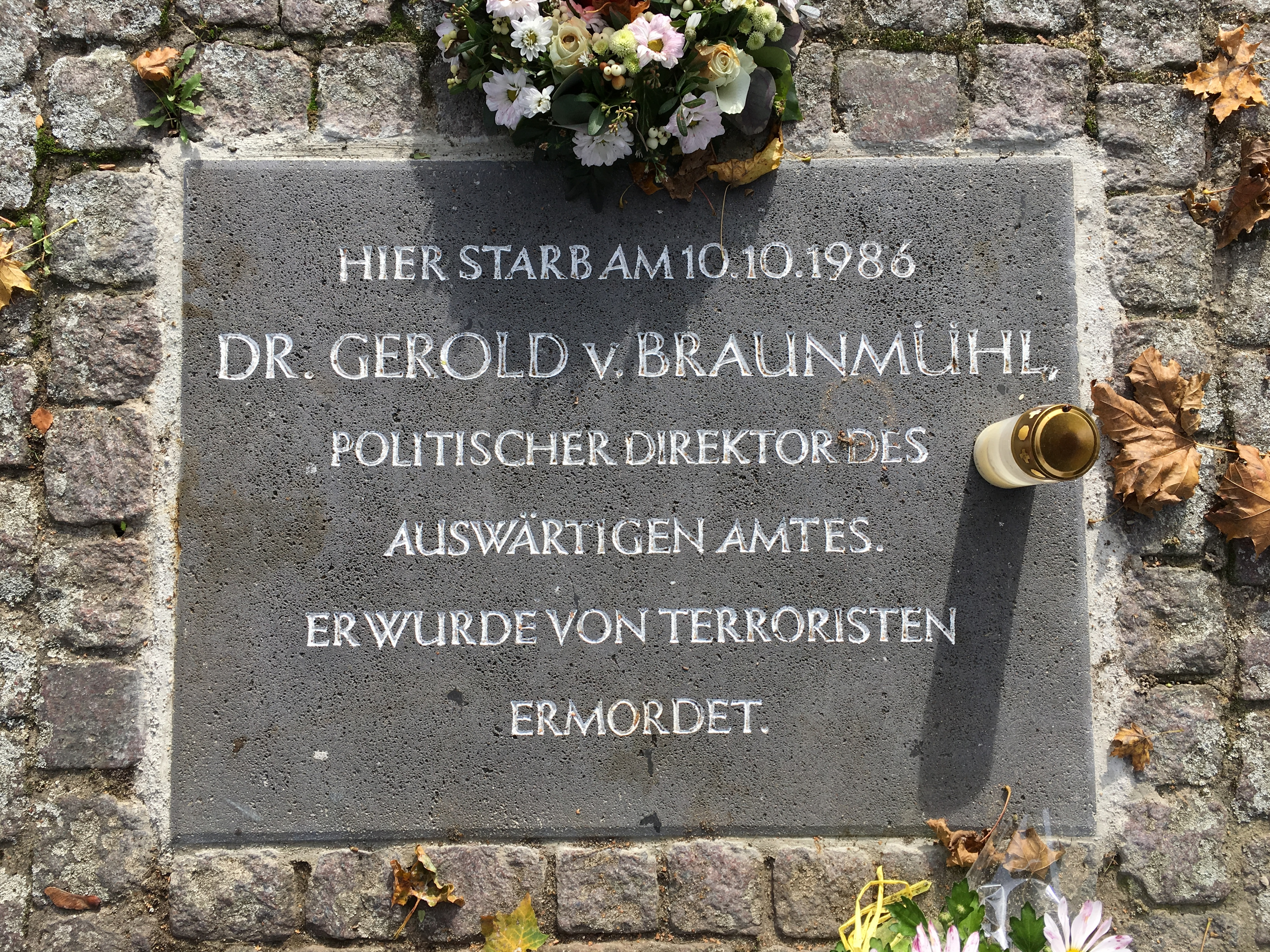
Memorial plaque in Bonn-Ippendorf at crime scene

== Murder ==
On the evening of 10 October, 1986, Braunmühl was shot by two people outside his residence in Bonn as he was arriving home from work. As he got out of his taxi, an unknown masked gunman came up to him and shot him twice in the upper body. As Braunmühl tried to escape behind a parked car, there appeared a second masked gunman who shot him at close range in the head, and disappeared together with the first gunman. The perpetrators fled to Bonn Endenich, where four days later their getaway car was discovered. Foreign Minister Hans-Dietrich Genscher, who had recently been released from hospital, wrote in his memoirs that he received a phone call from Mrs. Hilde Braunmühl, who said to him: "My husband has been shot." Then Genscher went to Ippendorf to the house of his former office manager. In the words of FM Genscher: "I will never forget the image of Gerold Braunmühl lying dead on the road in front of me."

The main suspects in his murder are Red Army Faction members Barbara and Horst Ludwig Meyer but there is no evidence. In the forensic examination of the projectiles, a revolver of the Smith & Wesson type was identified, most likely the same type of gun with which West German business leader Hanns Martin Schleyer had been executed (also by the RAF). Braunmühl left behind a wife and three children. His funeral took place in the Bonn Beethoven Hall and he was buried in Poppelsdorf Cemetery in Bonn. Near his residence in Bonn, Buchholzstraße 39, a commemorative plate was mounted in 1987 with the following text: "Here died on 10.10.1986 Dr. Gerold Braunmühl, Political Director of the Foreign Office. He was murdered by terrorists." Soon thereafter, Gerold Braunmühl Auditorium was dedicated in the (now defunct) training and education center of the Foreign Ministry (diplomatic academy) in Bonn. The Federal Foreign Office commemorates him through a memorial wall in the old building of the construction on the Werder market in Berlin for members who were killed in the line of duty.

== Open letter by the Braunmühl brothers to the RAF ==
In November 1986, the five brothers of Gerold Braunmühl wrote an open letter to the RAF, on the one hand to get an answer to the meaning and motives for his murder, and on the other hand to enter into a kind of "dialogue", to prevent further such acts.
