= Benno Zech =

German teacher and politician (1928–2022)

Member of the Landtag of Rhineland-Palatinate
- In office 18 May 1983 – 2 June 1987

Personal details
- Born: 5 October 1928 Niederkirchen bei Deidesheim, Bavaria, Germany
- Died: 23 October 2022 (aged 94) Hambach an der Weinstraße, Rhineland-Palatinate, Germany
- Party: CDU
- Education: Kurfürst-Ruprecht-Gymnasium Neustadt
- Occupation: Teacher

Benno Zech (5 October 1928 – 23 October 2022) was a German teacher and politician. A member of the Christian Democratic Union, he served in the Landtag of Rhineland-Palatinate from 1983 to 1987.

Zech died in Hambach an der Weinstraße on 23 October 2022, at the age of 94.
