= Helmut Kuhlmann =

German politician (1940–2022)

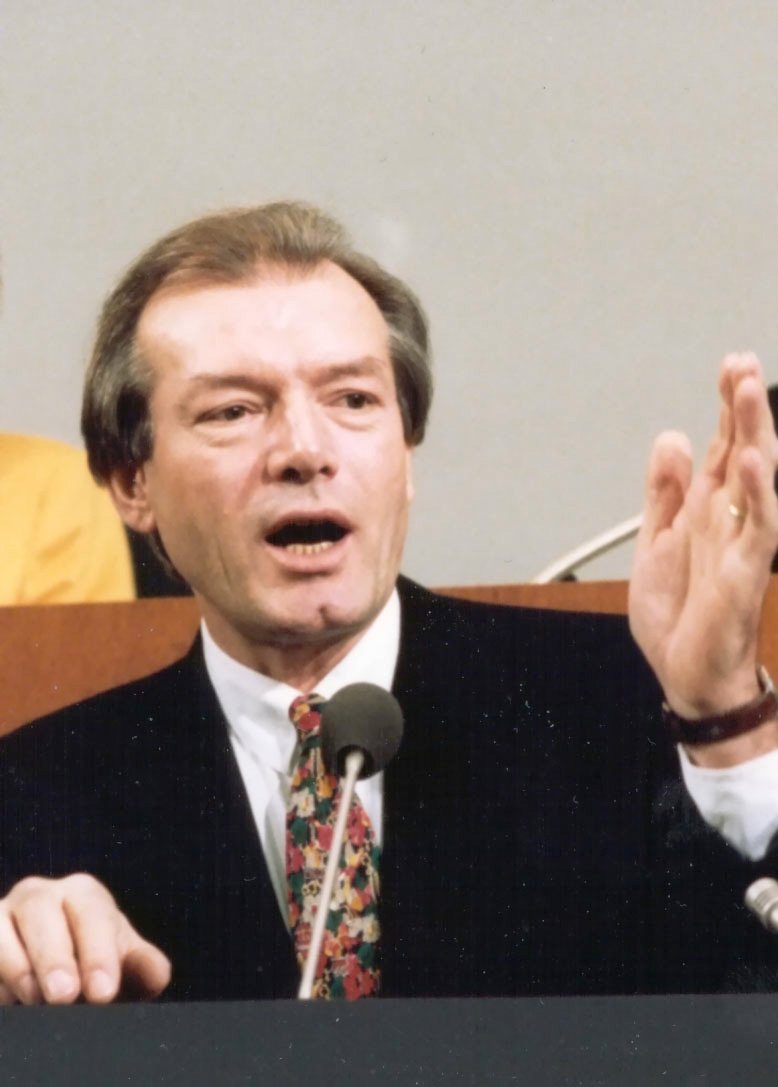
- Kuhlmann in 1990

Member of the Landtag of Lower Saxony
- In office 1974–1998

Personal details
- Born: 15 August 1940 Rumbeck, Hanover, Prussia, Germany
- Died: 20 October 2022 (aged 82)
- Party: CDU

Helmut Kuhlmann (15 August 1940 – 20 October 2022) was a German politician.

A member of the Christian Democratic Union, he served in the Landtag of Lower Saxony from 1974 to 1998.

Kuhlmann died on 20 October 2022, at the age of 82.
