= Heinz-Jörg Eckhold =

German politician (1941–2022)

Member of the Landtag of North Rhine-Westphalia
- In office 1 June 1995 – 8 June 2005

Personal details
- Born: 25 September 1941 Oberhausen, Rhine Province, Prussia, Germany
- Died: 17 October 2022 (aged 81)
- Party: CDU

Heinz-Jörg Eckhold was born the 25th of September 1941 in Oberhausen Germany. He was a German politician affiliated with the Christian Democratic Union political party.

Eckhold died at the age of 81 on the 17 October 2022.

== Training and work ==
Heinz-Jörg Eckhold grew up in a working-class family of six. After completing elementary school he graduated in 1956. From 1956 to 1961 he trained to become a machine fitter. Engaged in office activities and obtained the Abitur through the second educational path from 1961 to 1965. He was in the army from 1965 to 1967 as the reserve Mayor. Studied teaching subjects, including German, history, and Catholic education, from 1967 to 1971. Religion: In 1970, he completed the first state examination, followed by the second state examination in 1971, and in 1977, he earned his doctorate in education. From 1971 to 1978, he worked as a teacher in the school system while pursuing further studies. Beginning in 1978, he was employed by the Diocese of Essen. From 1994 to 2000, he served as the director of the "Institute for Social Education" within the Diocese of Essen. Since 2001, he has held the position of deputy head of the Department for Social and Global Church Affairs in the Diocese of Essen.

== Politics ==
Heinz-Jörg Eckhold joined the CDU (Christian Democratic Union political party) in 1959. From 1970 to 1974 he was the deputy chairman of the Young Union Oberhausen and the city district chairman. As chairman of the district association of the CDU Oberhausen, he worked from 1974 to 1977 and from 1990 to 1995. From 1986 to 2000 he was a member of the district board of the CDU Ruhrgebiet and from 1974 to 1978 and from 1984 he was a member of the council of Oberhausen. Further stages of his political career include serving as the chairman of the CDU parliamentary group in the council from 1992 to 2000 and as deputy chairman starting in 2001. He was also a member of the CDU parliamentary group at the Ruhrgebiet municipal association from 1994 to 1995.

== Writing ==
Heinz-Jörg Eckhold published the book "Die Rundholz - Deutsche Familiensaga um Liebe, Macht, Einfluss, Politik und Intrigen" on the 23rd of July 2012.
