= St. Stephan, Mainz =

Church in Mainz, Germany

Coordinates: 49°59′44″N 8°16′7″E

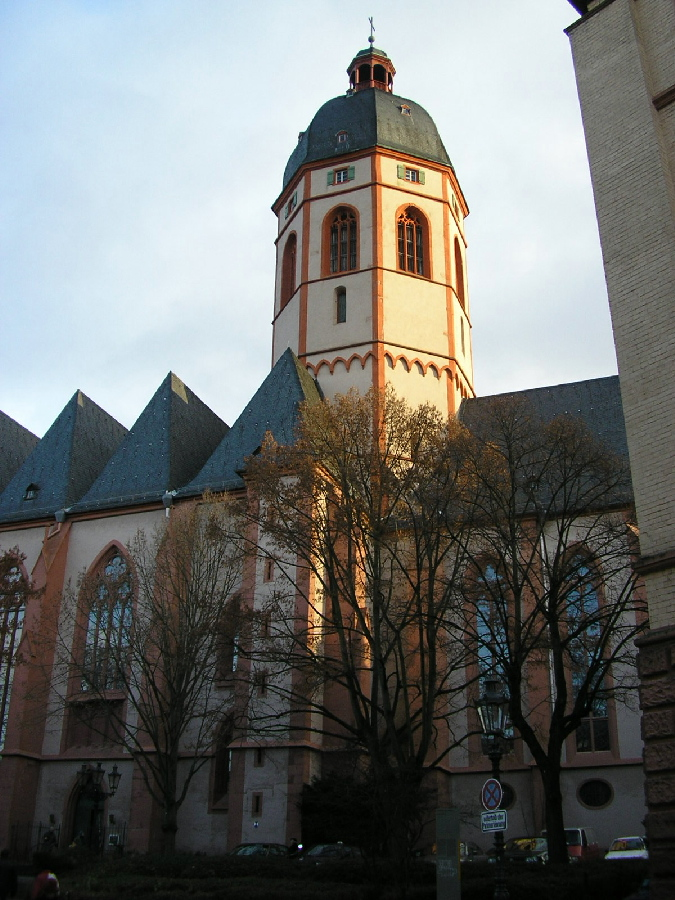
St. Stephan at Mainz. View of the great belfry, the highest spot in the city for centuries, and the nave.

The Collegiate Church of St. Stephan, known in German as St. Stephan zu Mainz, is a Gothic hall collegiate church located in the German city of Mainz. It is known for windows created by Marc Chagall.

== History ==
St. Stephan was originally built in 990 at the order of Archbishop Willigis, who also initiated the building of Mainz Cathedral. The church was founded on top of the highest hill in the town (in a charter of 992 by Otto III the church is described as being infra muros Mogontię in summitate eiusdem civitatis), most likely on behalf of Theophanu, the widow of Otto II. Willigis intended the church to be a site of prayer for the Empire.

The provost of the Collegiate Church administered one of the archdiaconates (a medieval organizational form similar to today's diaconates) of the Archbishopric of Mainz.

== The building ==
The current church building dates from the late medieval era; construction of the main area of the church began in about 1267 and was completed in 1340. The successional building kept the guidelines of the floor plan of the original Willigis building and with it the design as a double choir church. St. Stephan is the oldest Gothic hall church in the Upper Rhine district, and is (besides Mainz Cathedral) the most important church in the city of Mainz.

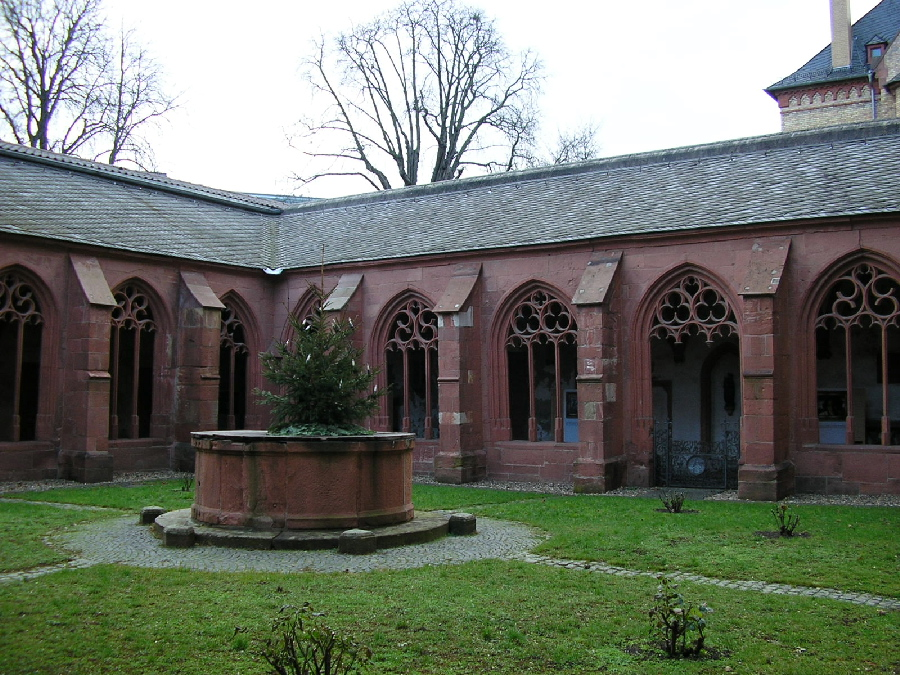
View of the Gothic cloister of St. Stephan, rebuilt 1968–71 after heavy destruction in World War II

Only a few changes have been made to the church since the 14th century. The cloister, for instance, was added between 1462 and 1499 to the southern side of the church, and the outer face of the church was updated during the Baroque period. In 1857 a great explosion in a nearby powder magazine (Mainz was a federal fortress in the 19th century) destroyed the baroque facing of the church.

St. Stephan was heavily damaged in the cause of the bombing of Mainz in World War II. The cloister was heavily damaged and was rebuilt between 1968 and 1971; the restoration of the huge western belfry was also completed at that time, albeit with some difficulty. The arches over the nave and the choir could not be saved and have been replaced by a flat wooden ceiling.

The church features a Gothic hall with a triple nave and quires at both the west and east ends. A large octagonal bell tower rises above the western choir.

== Decorations and furnishings ==
Chagall windows, towards the altar

=== Chagall windows ===
The Chagall choir windows in St. Stephan are unique in Germany. Between 1978 and his death in 1985, Belarusian Jewish artist Marc Chagall created nine stained-glass windows of scriptural figures in luminous blue. The figures depict scenes from the Old Testament, demonstrating the commonalities across Christian and Jewish traditions. Chagall intended his work to be a contribution to Jewish-German reconciliation, made all the more poignant by the fact that Chagall himself fled France under Nazi occupation. He chose St. Stephan due to his friendship with Monsignor Klaus Mayer, who was then the presiding priest of St. Stephan. Chagall's work has been continued after his death by his pupil Charles Marq and by others.

=== Others ===
Despite the immense damage caused by both World War II and the powder explosion to St. Stephan, the 13th-century altar mensa (or table) and the huge Tabernacle dating from about 1500 have both survived.

Archbishop Willigis was buried in the church in 1011. His resting place is no longer known, but it is believed he is buried in the collegiate area.

== Literature ==
- Mayer, Klaus (2002). St. Stephan in Mainz. ISBN 978-3-7954-4310-8.
- Kern, Susanne (2021). Die ehemalige Stiftskirche St. Stephan in Mainz (in German). Regensburg: Schnell + Steiner. ISBN 978-3-7954-3465-6.
