= Heidemarie Fischer =

German researcher and politician (1944–2022)

Member of the Abgeordnetenhaus of Berlin
- In office 1995–2006
- In office 1986–1990

Personal details
- Born: Heidemarie Baschurow; 19 October 1944 Berlin, Brandenburg, Prussia, Germany
- Died: 4 September 2022 (aged 77) Berlin, Germany
- Party: SPD
- Occupation: Researcher

Heidemarie Fischer (née Baschurow) (19 October 1944 – 4 September 2022) was a German politician. A member of the Social Democratic Party of Germany, she served in the Abgeordnetenhaus of Berlin from 1986 to 1990 and again from 1995 to 2006.

Fischer died in Berlin on 4 September 2022, at the age of 77.
