= Hellmut Flashar =

German philologist (1929–2022)

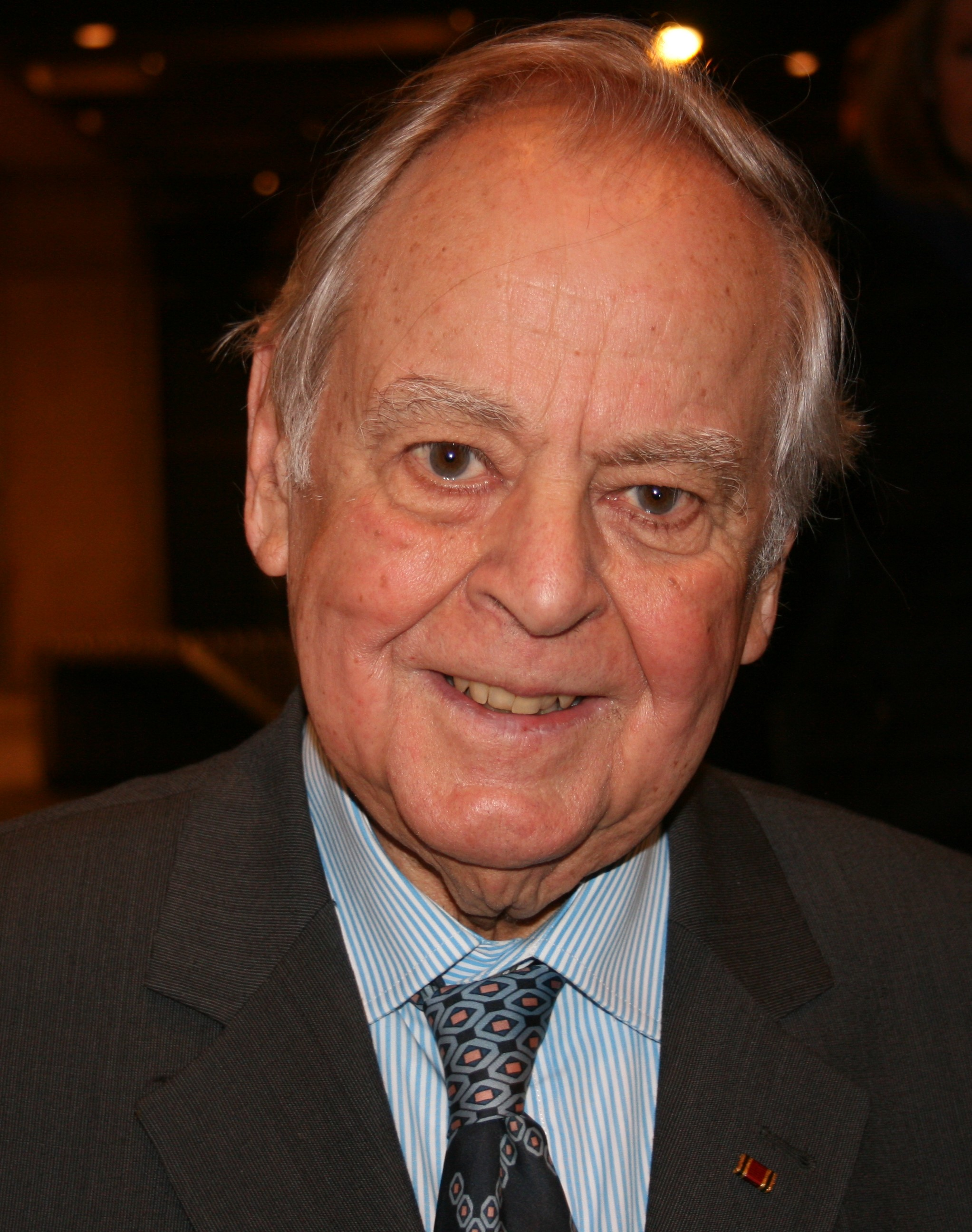
Flashar in 2013

Hellmut Flashar (German: [ˈflashaʁ]; 3 December 1929 – 17 August 2022) was a German classical philologist and translator.

== Life and career ==
Flashar was born in Hamburg on 3 December 1929. As a professor, he taught at the Ruhr University Bochum (1965–1982) and at LMU Munich (1982–1997).

== Academic publications ==
Books, essays, and comments on the following texts:

The Dialogue Ion as a Testimony of Platonic Philosophy (1958), Aristotle, Problemata Physica (1962, 4th ed. 1991), Melancholy in Ancient Medical Theories (1966), The Epitaphios of Pericles (1969), Aristotle, Mirabilia (1972, 3rd ed. 1990), Aristotle in: Plan of the History of Philosophy (1983, 2nd extended edition 2004), staging of antiquity (1991, 2nd extended and updated edition of 2009), Sophocles (2000), Felix Mendelssohn-Bartholdy and the Greek Tragedy (2001).

Numerous journal articles (39 contributions) to 1989 summarized in: HF, Eidola, Selected Little Writings (1989), then another 23 contributions summarized in: Spectra. Small contributions to drama, philosophy and antiquity, Tübingen 2004 (Classica Monacensia 29). Publication of two records and a CD with music to the ancient drama. Festschrift: Orchestra (1994)

== Death ==
Flashar died on 17 August 2022, at the age of 92.
