= Sebastian von Rotenhan =

German forester and politician (1949–2022)

Sebastian Freiherr von Rotenhan

Member of the Landtag of Bavaria
- In office 28 September 1998 – 20 October 2008

Personal details
- Born: Sebastian Freiherr von Rotenhan; 1 November 1949 Bamberg, Bavaria, West Germany
- Died: 26 October 2022 (aged 72) Germany
- Party: CSU
- Occupation: Forester

Sebastian Freiherr von Rotenhan (1 November 1949 – 26 October 2022) was a German baron, forester, and politician.

A member of the Christian Social Union in Bavaria, he served in the Landtag of Bavaria from 1998 to 2008.

Von Rotenhan died on 26 October 2022, at the age of 72.
