= Wolfgang Jenssen =

German politician (1942–2022)

Member of the Landtag of Rhineland-Palatinate
- In office 18 May 1971 – 17 May 1979

Personal details
- Born: 8 October 1942 Stolpmünde, Pomerania, Prussia, Germany
- Died: 21 October 2022 (aged 80)
- Party: SPD
- Occupation: Auditor

Wolfgang Jenssen (8 October 1942 – 21 October 2022) was a German politician. A member of the Social Democratic Party, he served in the Landtag of Rhineland-Palatinate, from 1971 to 1979. After attending elementary school, he graduated from St. Matthias High School in Gerolstein in 1963. He completed his studies in economics in Cologne in 1968 with a degree in economics.

From 1969, he worked for Deutsche Revisions- und Treuhand AG. He became a tax consultant in 1973 and an auditor in 1977.

Jenssen died on 21 October 2022, at the age of 80.
