= Aldona Gustas =

Lithuanian-German poet and illustrator (1932–2022)

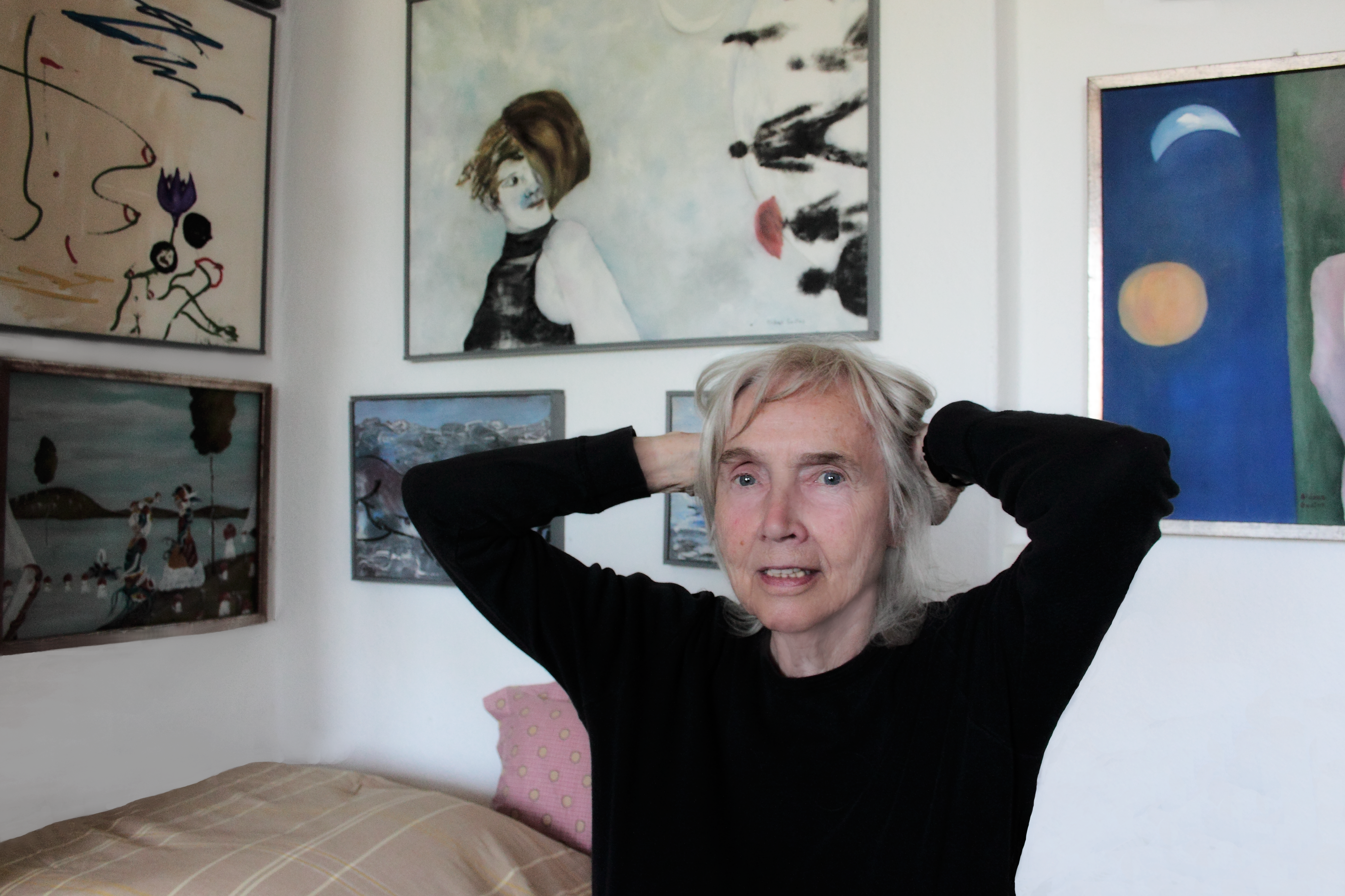
- Gustas in 2012
- Born: 2 March 1932; Karceviškiai, Lithuania
- Died: 8 December 2022 (aged 90); Berlin, Germany
- Occupations: Poet, illustrator
- Awards: Cross of the Order of Merit of the Federal Republic of Germany

Aldona Gustas (2 March 1932 – 8 December 2022) was a Lithuanian-German poet and illustrator.

== Biography ==
Gustas was born in the Lithuanian village of Karceviškiai in 1932. Her family lived for some time in Vilnius, but she and her mother fled then Russian-occupied Lithuania in 1941, when her father was seized and deported to Siberia. She and her mother settled in Berlin where she has lived ever since.

Gustas made her literary debut in 1962 with a book of poetry, "Nachtstraßen" (Night Streets), published by Eremitenpresse. Between 1962 and 1980 she published eleven poetry books and several anthologies. Many of her poetry books also feature her drawings and graphics. Her texts have been translated into Lithuanian, Italian, Spanish, French, Russian, Polish and American English.

In 1972 Gustas co-founded an important artistic forum in West Berlin, the "Berliner Malerpoeten" (Berlin painter/poets), a group of artists who both wrote and illustrated their works. This group included Günter Grass, Günter Bruno Fuchs and Wolfdietrich Schnurre.

In 1997 Gustas received the Rahel Varnhagen Medal. Gustas was a member of the Varnhagen Society and Association of German Writers (VS). She was married to historian Georg Holmsten.

== Style ==
The central theme of Gustas' poetry is love and playful eroticism in a utopian world of fantasy. She often draws upon references to elements such as clouds, swans, sea gulls, flowers, swimming fish, stars etc., but often with laconic phrasing. Gustas is very much a feminist poet and many of her poems are deeply personal and almost autobiographical, marking her as distinct from other contemporary German poets, not only in her ethnicity but in her subject matter. Her verses are often less sophisticated than those of other poets, with subjective sensations and exploring her interaction with the environment, often in paradoxical formulations. Gustas makes frequent references to Lithuanian "dainos" and folktales, modeling the landscape of her childhood in the poetic form. This fairytale landscape contributes to an epic sense of fantasy and dynamic interaction between nature and society. She has been cited as saying that in her works, she dwells in a city that grows in the forest; where nature spirits lurk behind each tree; where the moon strums a guitar; and where blue blossoms grow in underground garages.

== Literature ==
- Theo Breuer, Aldona Gustas, Jetzt (In: T.B., Ohne Punkt & Komma. Lyrik in den 90er Jahren (1999)
- Hendrik Liersch (Hg.), Festschrift zum 70. Geburtstag von Aldona Gustas (2002)
