= Alfons Vogtel =

German politician (1952–2022)

Member of the Landtag of Saarland
- In office 9 April 1985 – 1 April 2007
- Preceded by: Werner Scherer
- Succeeded by: Michael Schley

Personal details
- Born: 9 June 1952 Illingen, Saar Protectorate
- Died: 3 December 2022 (aged 70) Völklingen, Saarland, Germany
- Party: CDU
- Occupation: Businessman

Alfons Vogtel (9 June 1952 – 3 December 2022) was a German businessman and politician. A member of the Christian Democratic Union, he served in the Landtag of Saarland from 1985 to 2007.

Vogtel died in Völklingen on 3 December 2022, at the age of 70.
