= Klaus Peter Sauer =

German biologist and ecologist (1941–2022)

- Born: 2 February 1941; Frankfurt, Hesse-Nassau, Prussia, Germany
- Died: 12 November 2022 (aged 81)
- Education: University of Giessen
- Occupations: Biologist; Ecologist

Klaus Peter Sauer (2 February 1941 – 12 November 2022) was a German evolutionary biologist and ecologist.

== Biography ==
After graduating from the Liebig-Realgymnasium in Giessen, Sauer studied biology, genetics, chemistry, and mathematics at the University of Giessen. From 1969 to 1971, he was a research assistant at Giessen and from 1971 to 1979, a research assistant of Günther Osche at the University of Freiburg. In 1979, he was appointed chair of evolutionary research at Bielefeld University.

In 1992, Sauer became head of the Institute for Evolutionary Biology and Ecology at the University of Bonn. From 1993 to 1999, he was coordinator of the German Research Foundation program Genetische Analyse von Sozialsystemen and was spokesperson of the Genetische Analyse von Sozialsystemen program from 2002 to 2004. He retired in 2008.

Sauer died on 12 November 2022, at the age of 81.

== Honors ==
- Liaison lecturer of the Studienstiftung (1977–1979, 1990–1992)
- Member of the Scientific Advisory Board of the Deutsche Zoologische Gesellschaft (1990–1994)
- Deputy Chairman of the Deutsche Zoologische Gesellschaft (1991–1993)
- President of the Deutsche Zoologische Gesellschaft (1994–1996)
- Member of the German National Academy of Sciences Leopoldina (since 1999)
