= Manfred Degen =

German teacher and politician (1939–2022)

Member of the Landtag of North Rhine-Westphalia
- In office 31 May 1990 – 2 June 2005

Personal details
- Born: 13 October 1939 Elbing, Reichsgau Danzig-West Prussia, Germany
- Died: 24 September 2022 (aged 82)
- Party: SPD
- Education: Pädagogische Hochschule Ruhr
- Occupation: Teacher

Manfred Degen (13 October 1939 – 24 September 2022) was a German politician. A member of the Social Democratic Party of Germany, he served in the Landtag of North Rhine-Westphalia from 1990 to 2005.

Degen died on 24 September 2022, at the age of 82.
