= Heinrich Schneier =

German politician (1925–2022)

Member of the Landtag of Bavaria
- In office 1962–1974

Personal details
- Born: 21 December 1925 Zeil am Main, Bavaria, Germany
- Died: 29 October 2022 (aged 96)
- Party: SPD

Heinrich Schneier (21 December 1925 – 29 October 2022) was a German politician. A member of the Social Democratic Party, he served in the Landtag of Bavaria from 1962 to 1974.

Schneier died on 29 October 2022, at the age of 96.
