= Hartmut Holzapfel =

German politician

Hartmut Holzapfel (born 5 September 1944 in Röhrda, Germany; died 21 December 2022), was a Hessian politician (SPD), former Hessian Minister of Culture, and former chairman of the Hessian Council on Literature.

Holzapfel finished High School in 1964 and studied Sociology at the University of Frankfurt, MA equiv. 1969. Frankfurt was then the center of "liberal" sociology in Germany and of the second phase of the "Frankfurt School", often called the "German Berkeley". Holzapfel became active in Social Democratic party politics already in 1961, becoming the personal assistant of the Hessian Minister of Culture Ludwig von Friedeburg, the author of the most significant liberal education reforms in Germany of that period, in the key years from 1969 to 1974. 1972-1974 Holzapfel was also a member of the Frankfurt City Council.

In 1974, Holzapfel was elected to the Hessian Parliament, the Landtag, and remained there until 2008, with an interruption in 1995-1999. Between 1991 and 1999, he was Minister of Culture (in charge primarily of schools but not of universities) and pursued a reformist agenda.

In 2004, Holzapfel became Chairman of the Hessian Council on Literature, a state foundation promoting and sponsoring literature and creative writing.
