= Margot von Renesse =

German politician (1940–2022)

Margot von Renesse (born 5 February 1940 in Berlin; died 17 June 2022) was a German politician.

== Life ==
Renesse studied German law at the University of Münster. In 1969 Renesse became a member of the German political party SPD. From 1972, she worked as a judge in Bochum. From 1990 to 2002 Renesse was a member of the German Bundestag. She was married and had four children. One of her sons Jan-Robert von Renesse became a judge. She died in June 2022.

== Awards ==
- 2004: Honorary degree by Ruhr University Bochum
- 2004: Crosses of the Order of Merit of the Federal Republic of Germany
