= Manfred Palmen =

German politician (1945–2022)

Member of the Landtag of North Rhine-Westphalia
- In office 2 June 2000 – 31 May 2012

Personal details
- Born: 11 March 1945 Kaarst, Rhine Province, Prussia, Germany
- Died: 18 November 2022 (aged 77) Kleve, North Rhine-Westphalia, Germany
- Party: CDU
- Education: University of Bonn
- Occupation: Lawyer

Manfred Palmen (11 March 1945 – 18 November 2022) was a German politician. A member of the Christian Democratic Union, he served in the Landtag of North Rhine-Westphalia from 2000 to 2012.

Palmen died in Kleve on 18 November 2022, at the age of 77.
