= 2022 Judo Grand Slam Düsseldorf =

Judo 2022 Judo Grand Slam Düsseldorf
- Location: Düsseldorf, Germany
- Dates: ~~4–6 June 2022~~ — Cancelled

The 2022 Judo Grand Slam Düsseldorf was to be held in Düsseldorf, Germany, from 4 to 6 June 2022.

The German Judo Federation announced on 15 February that the event would be cancelled due to financial difficulties resulting from Covid-19 restrictions.
