= Dieter Werkmüller =

German academic and lawyer (1937–2022)

- Born: 11 July 1937; Wiesbaden, Hesse-Nassau, Prussia, Germany
- Died: 24 October 2022 (aged 85); Kirchhain, Hesse, Germany
- Education: LMU Munich; Goethe University Frankfurt
- Occupations: Professor; Lawyer

Dieter Werkmüller (11 July 1937 – 24 October 2022) was a German academic and lawyer.

== Biography ==
Werkmüller studied law at LMU Munich and Goethe University Frankfurt. He completed his first state examination in 1962 and his second in 1966. He then worked as a research assistant in Frankfurt before moving to the University of Marburg. He completed his doctorate in 1970 with a legal history work on Weisthümer.

Two years later, Werkmüller was appointed chair of legal history and civil law at Marburg, where he taught and researched until his retirement in 2002. He then worked at a law firm alongside Ekkehard Kaufmann until 2006, while continuing to hold lectures on legal history at Marburg until that same year.

Werkmüller's research focused on German legal history. He achieved great notoriety thanks to his work, Handwörterbuch zur deutschen Rechtsgeschichte, written alongside Adalbert Erler, Ekkehard Kaufmann, and Wolfgang Stammler.

Werkmüller died in Kirchhain on 24 October 2022, at the age of 85.
