= Hambach an der Weinstraße =

Coordinates: 49.329°N 8.130°E

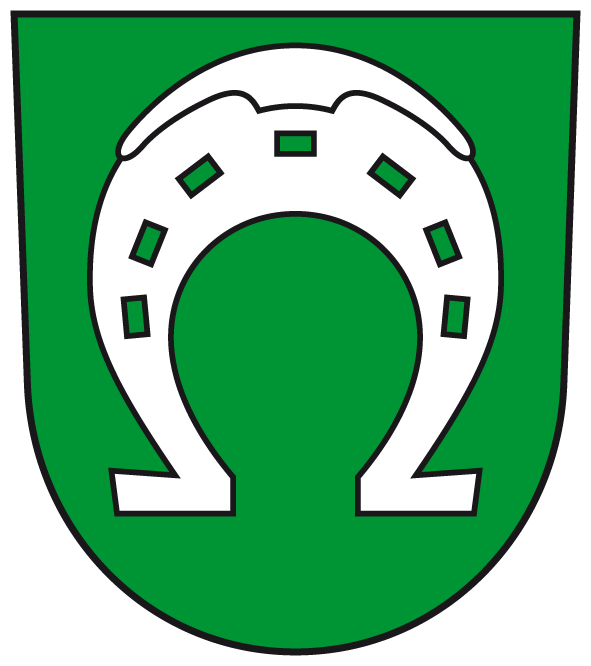
Coat of arms of Hambach

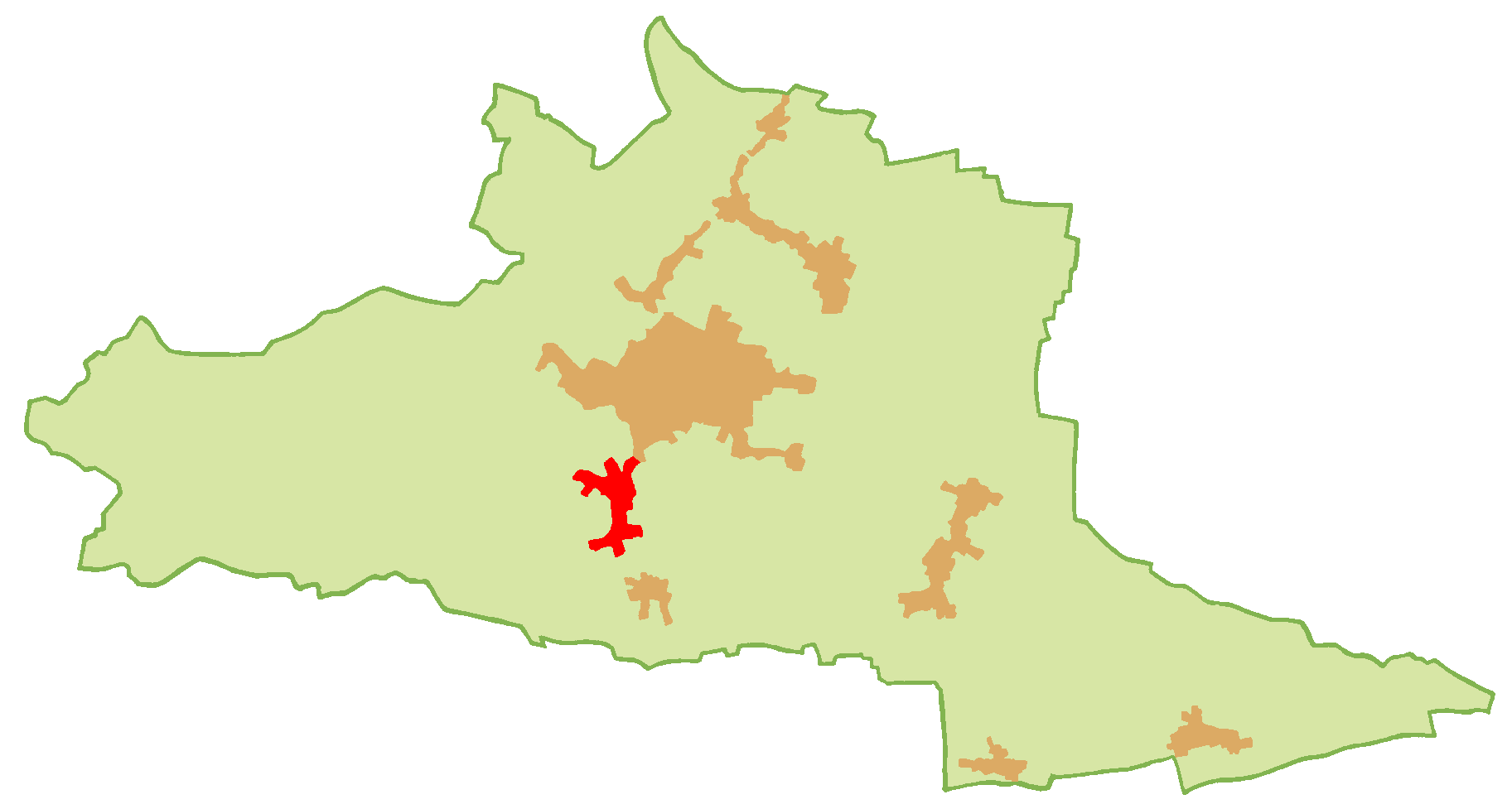
Hambach (red) within the area of Neustadt

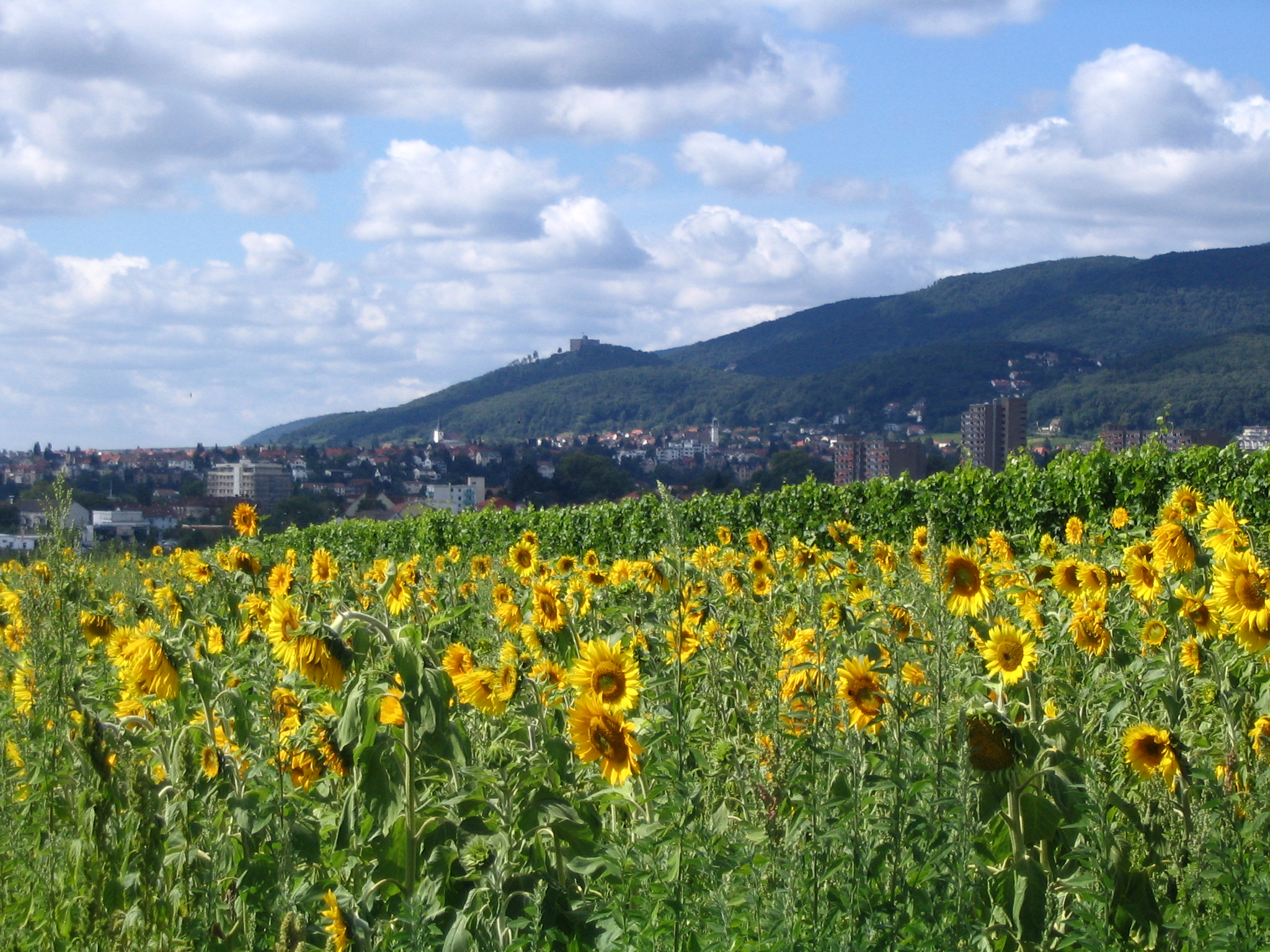
View from the North-East over Neustadt on Hambach with the castle in the background

Hambach, which received its name affix "an der Weinstraße" as a wine village in 1935, was incorporated into the town Neustadt an der Weinstraße (Rhineland-Palatinate) in 1969 and is its second largest district. The village is considered a symbol of German democracy because of the enunciation of freedom which took place in the Hambach Castle in 1832, known as the Hambach Festival.

== Geography ==
=== Position ===
Hambach is located in the Anterior Palatinate on the eastern slope of the Haardt and on the west side of the Upper Rhine Plain, approximately 150 to 300 m above NHN; the old townhall has an altitude of 182 m. The central city of Neustadt an der Weinstraße joins in the North-East and the Diedesfeld district is located in the South.

=== Climate ===
Because it is situated on a hillside on the edge of the lowlands, there is a mild Climate. Cold airmasses, which appear during spring nights and cause late frosts, float down the slopes into the valley and flow into the level country. The western elevations Häuselberg, Heidelberg and Schlossberg, which are parts of the Haart, keep away the majority of the precipitation.

== History ==
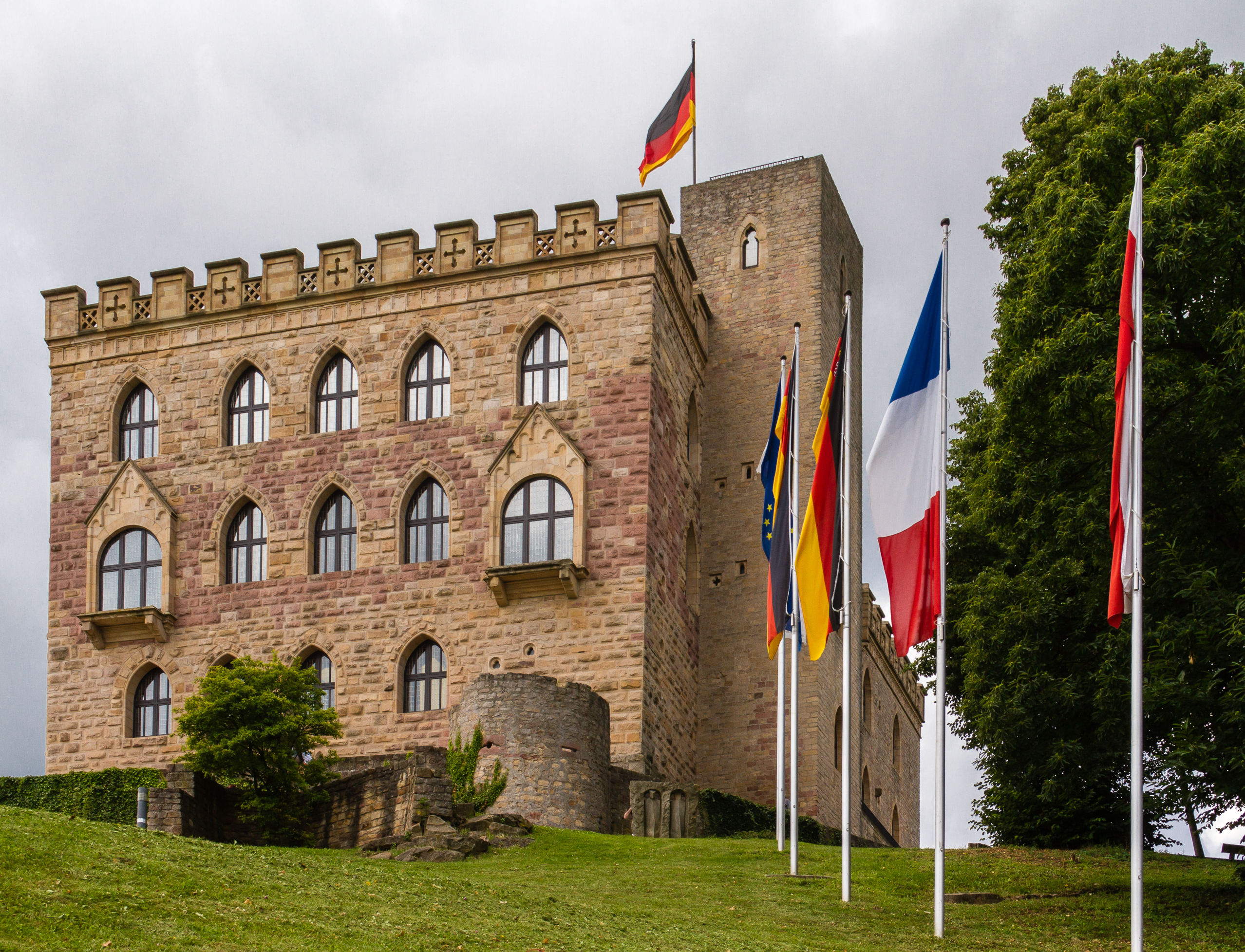
Hambach castle

The Römerweg (the lower part of which is called Dammstraße) was falsely believed to be the old Roman connection between Straßburg and Mainz. Instead, it ran east of the hills of the Weinstraße through the level country. The term "Hantio", referring to Roman cores of settlement, did not enter any later documents. The name "Hambach" derives from the Rhine Franconian word "Haganbach", which was first mentioned in a document in 865 and refers to a stream ("Bach"), which has its source in a sparse forest ("Hag"). The "Hambach", a stream originating at the northern foot of the 379.2 m high Schlossberg and flowing east through "Mittelhambach", is most likely responsible for the naming of the village.

The northern route of the Palatine Ways of St. James, which was part of the historical pilgrim route to Santiago de Compostela, lead through Hambach. The three former local areas "Ober-", "Mittel-" and "Unterhambach" are named after their altitude and have been united for a long time. Unterhambach is often equated with its most significant street, the "Andergasse" (Palatine German "anner Gass", meaning "andere Gasse" in German or "other alley" in English).

The most significant event in the history of the village was the enunciation of freedom, which took place at the Hambach Castle in 1832 and is known as the Hambach Festival.

The village's independence ended with the amalgamation into the town Neustadt an der Weinstraße on 7 June 1969. An anew breakup, like it was desired shortly after the unification, is not pursued anymore.

== Politics ==
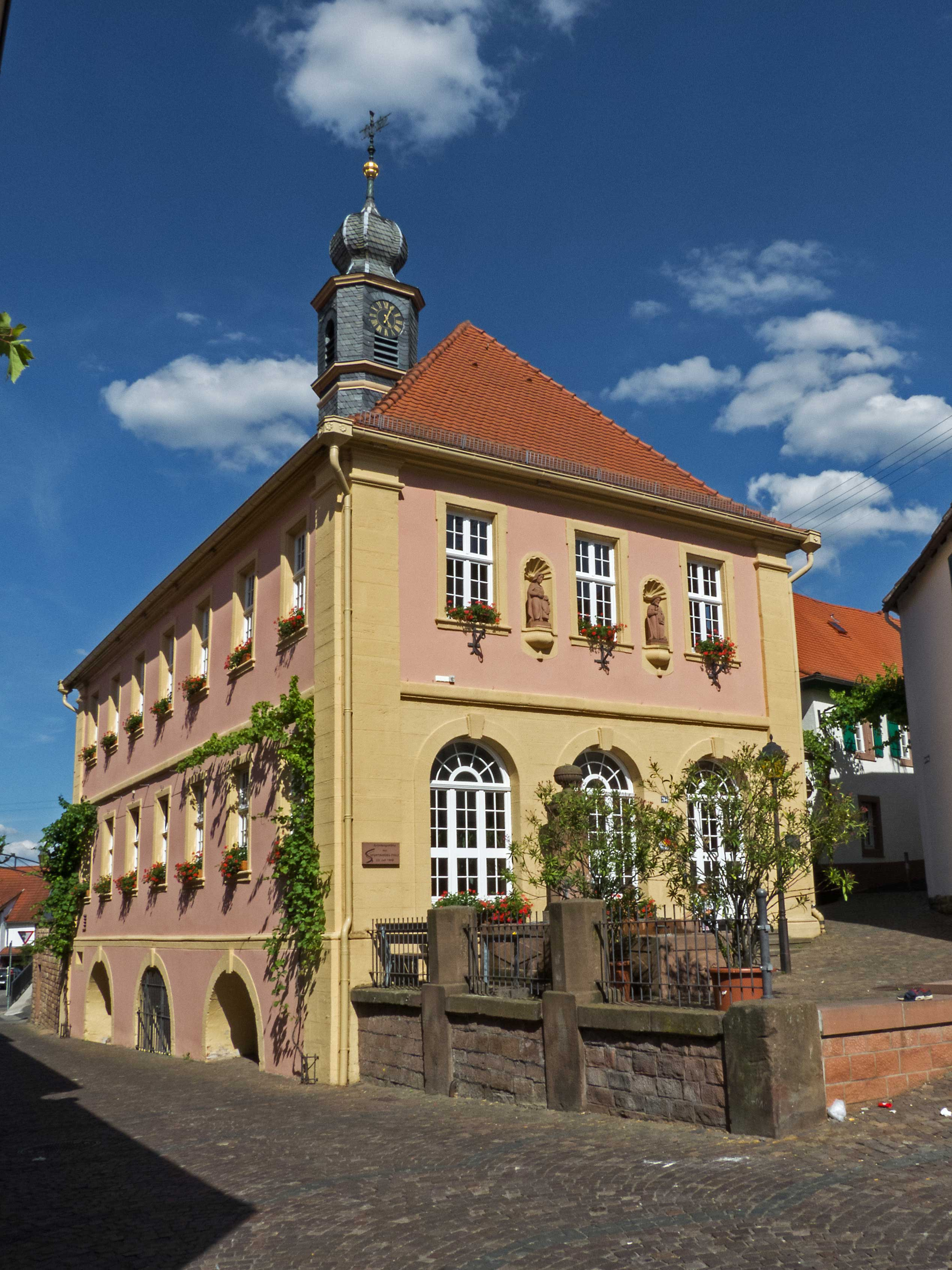
Old town hall

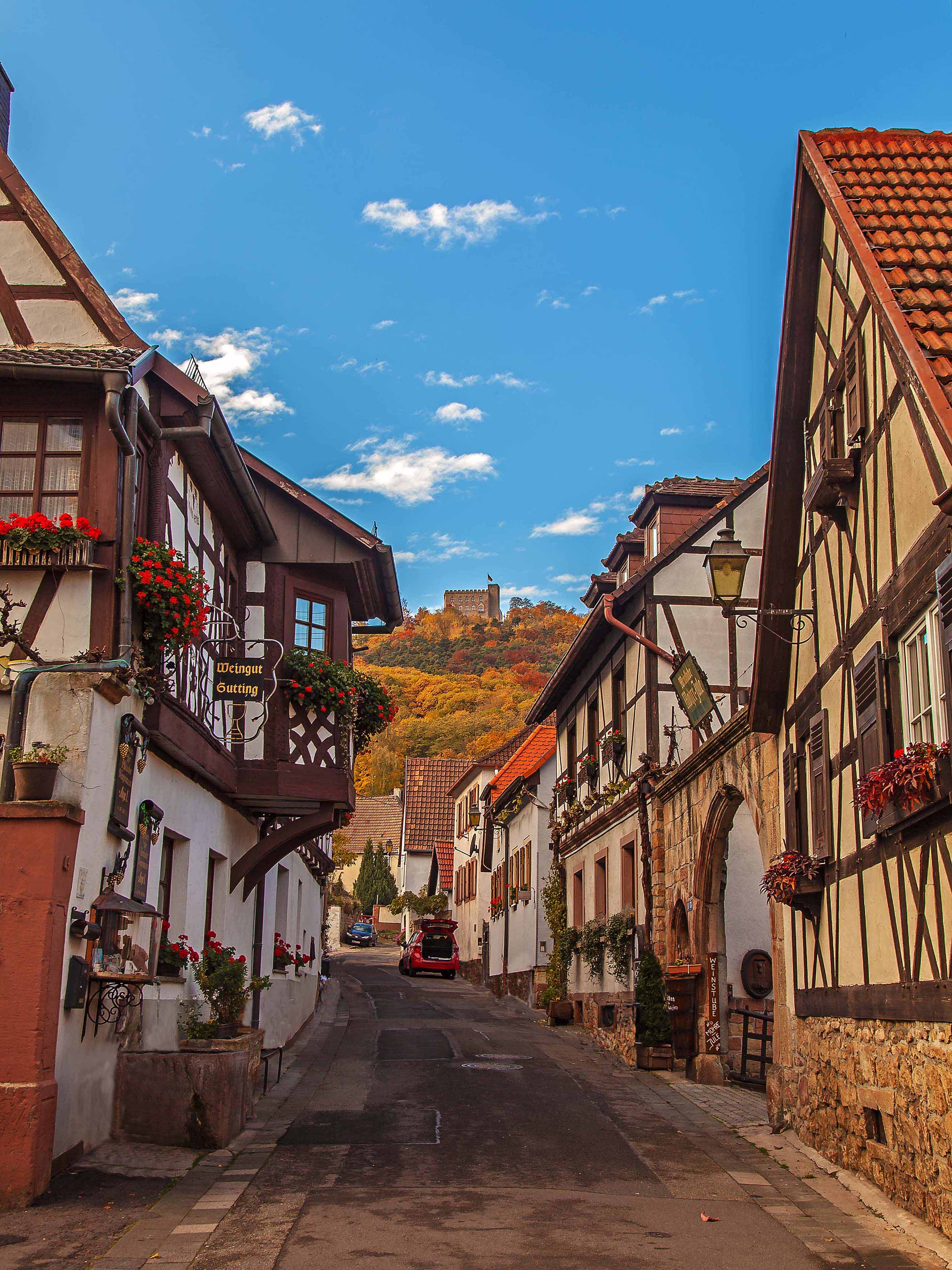
View across the Schlossgasse to the castle

=== Town Advisory Committee ===
The town's advisory committee consists of 15 members and is chaired by municipal administrator Gerda Bolz.

=== Coat of Arms ===
The former coat of arms depicts a downfacing silver horseshoe with a toe cap and seven rectangular nail holes on a green background.

== Landmarks and Culture ==
=== Landmarks ===
Hambach has more than three areas with over a hundred individual buildings which are under conservation. Hambach Castle is located on the Schlossberg, looking down on the town. It is also known under its former name "Kästenburg" (from the Palatine "Keschde", meaning chestnut tree, which grow on the Schlossberg) and "Maxburg" (since 1842, named after the former Bavarian King Maximilian II of Bavaria). The fortified church in Oberhambach dates back to the Middle Ages, as does the castle. The old town hall was built in 1739 by the prince-bishop Damian Hugo Philipp von Schönborn, cardinal and knight of the Teutonic Order, in 1739. The episcopal forestry lodge is located in Unterhambach.

=== Regular Events ===
Andergasser Festival The annual Andergasser Fest is one of the biggest wine festivals of the Palatinate and takes place at the beginning of May. The name of the festival derives from the Andergasse, which is in fact the road on which the festival takes place. Hambach Castle can be seen from the western end of the street.

The Andergasser Fest begins with the setting up of the maypole in the Obergasse as well as the so-called "Küfer" dance by the local winegrowers. Local restaurants offer local wines and regional specialities of the Palatinate cuisine such as Rotisserie, homemade smoked ham or „Flääschknepp“, which are broth-cooked meatballs with horseradish.

Hambach Black-Red-Gold (Hambach Schwarz-Rot-Gold) As a follow-up event to Hambach's Brunnen- und Gässelkerwe (from German Kerwe, meaning "parish fair"), the wine festival Hambach schwarz-rot-gold (Hambach black-red-gold) has been celebrated on the second weekend of June since 2012. The name of the festival is a reference to the Hambach Festival of 1832, in which the current German flag was carried along and which is considered the starting point of the German democratic movement. The festival was named Wine Festival of the Year 2013 by the Palatinate wine advertisers in 2013.

Other Events The Jakobus-Kerwe ("James parish fair") (last week-end of July), CuliVino (Whit Saturday and Whit Sunday) and the year-round Events of the Hambach Castle are also popular events.

== Economy and Infrastructure ==
=== Economy ===
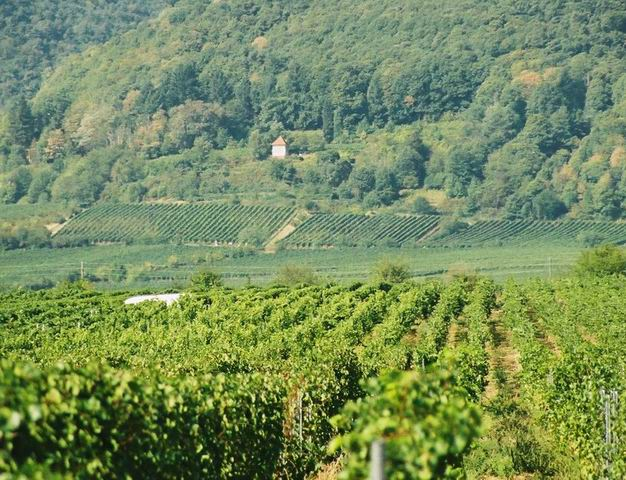
Wineyards near Hambach

The convenient climate conditions enable the cultivation of high-quality wines. The vineyard locations of Hambach are Feuer, Kaiserstuhl, Kirchberg, Römerbrunnen and Schlossberg. The plants are not only sold worldwide, but can also be savoured at local wineries, taverns and restaurants.

Besides sweet chestnuts, almonds, figs and citrus fruits grow in the region. The Schlossberg especially strikes one with the light green foliage of its sweet chestnut trees (which represent 80% of the tree population) in early spring.

Hambach is an officially recognised resort and has a large heated lido on its eastern edge.

=== Demographic Development ===
With over 5000 inhabitants, Hambach is Neustadt's largest town. It had 5531 inhabitants in June 2011, and 5288 in January 2012. Being situated on a hillside, it already had a reputation of being a quality residential suburb of Neustadt before the amalgamation. Particularly the Römerweg is a popular residential area.

=== Traffic ===
Hambach is connected to the A 65 (interchange 13/Neustadt-Süd), which goes to Ludwigshafen and Karlsruhe as well as to the former B 38 (L 516 today) and the German wine route(also called "Weinstraße"), which crosses the village and leads North to Neustadt. In a southern direction, the German wine route reaches Diedesfeld after 1 km.

== Famous Figures ==
=== Sons and Daughters of Hambach ===
- Jakob Friedrich Bussereau (1863–1919), Catholic cleric
- Emil Josef Clade (1916–2010), German combat pilot and aviation pioneer

=== People Who Have Worked and Lived in Hambach ===
- Karolina Burger (1879–1949), Catholic teacher and monastery founder, worked as a sick leave cover in Hambach in 1898.
- Eibe Riedel (born 1943), retired law professor, lives in Hambach.
- Johannes von Geissel (1796–1864), Catholic cleric, Bishop of Speyer, Archbishop of Cologne and Cardinal, was briefly a chaplain in Hambach in 1818/19.
- Georg Grohé (1846–1919), landowner and vintner in Hambach, was a Reichstag deputy and mayor.
- Franz Xaver Remling (1803–1873), Catholic cleric, minister of Hambach in 1833–1852, episcopal cleric advisor, Canon of the diocese of Speyer, produced many historic works.
- Franz Schwarzwälder (born 1949), goalkeeper with 1. FC Nürnberg and FSV Mainz 05, grew up in Hambach.
- Aloys Weisenburger (1815–1887), Catholic cleric, preacher, author and publicizer, lived in Hambach.
- Benno Zech (born 1928), was municipal administrator from 1969 to 1996, and a teacher at the Dr. Albert Finck School from 1957 to 1983, and head from 1977.

== Literature ==
- Alexander Thon (2002), "Hambach", in Jürgen Keddigkeit (ed.), Pfälzisches Burgenlexikon (in German), vol. 12, Kaiserslautern: Institut für Pfälzische Geschichte und Volkskunde, p. 271, ISBN 3-927754-48-X
- Paul Habermehl (1977), Hambach an der Weinstraße: Führer durch die Ortsgeschichte (in German), Neustadt-Hambach, "Festgabe zur Einweihung des Pfarrzentrums St. Jakobus"
- Philipp Otto Abel (1956), Hambach an der Weinstraße: Ein Gang durch die Ortsgeschichte (in German), Landau: Verlag Kraemer
