= Klaus Mayer =

German Roman Catholic priest (1923–2022)

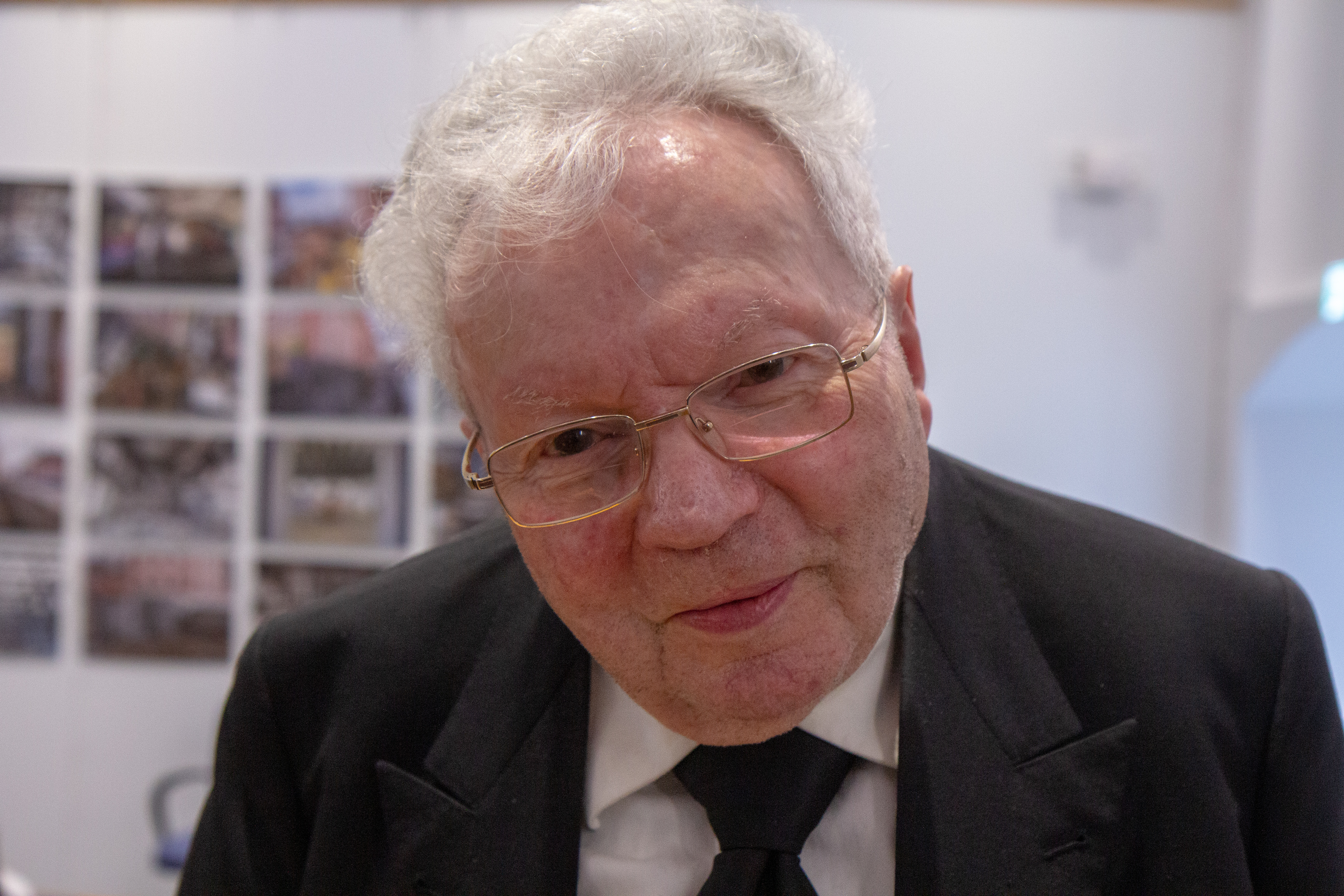
- Mayer in 2019
- Born: 24 February 1923; Darmstadt, Hesse, Germany
- Died: 16 December 2022 (aged 99); Mainz, Rhineland-Palatinate, Germany
- Education: Ettal Monastery; Rabanus-Maurus-Gymnasium; Priesterseminar Mainz
- Occupation: Catholic priest

Ecclesiastical career
- Religion: Christianity
- Church: Roman Catholic Church
- Ordained: 30 July 1950
- Congregations served: Collegiate Church of St. Stephan, Mainz

Klaus Mayer (24 February 1923 – 16 December 2022) was a German Roman Catholic priest in the Diocese of Mainz and was an honorary citizen of Mainz.

== Biography ==
Mayer was born in Darmstadt on 24 February 1923. Due to his half-Jewish heritage from his father, Karl Jakob Mayer, he received severe persecution from the Nazi Party. His father emigrated to Argentina in 1933, though he stayed in Germany with his mother, Emmi Meisinger. He found refuge at the Ettal Monastery, where he attended secondary school. After the abbey closed in 1942, he graduated from the Rabanus-Maurus-Gymnasium. He was not admitted to any universities and narrowly escaped deportation in February 1945.

After the end of World War II, Mayer entered the Priesterseminar Mainz and was ordained a priest by Bishop of Mainz Albert Stohr on 30 July 1950 at the Mainz Cathedral. He subsequently worked as a chaplain in Büdesheim, Seligenstadt, and Oppenheim. He was appointed pastor of a church in Gau-Bickelheim, where he served for six years. From 1965 until his retirement in 1991, he was pastor of the Collegiate Church of St. Stephan in Mainz and played a key role in the reconstruction of the church, which had sustained damages during World War II.

In 1973, Mayer asked Jewish artist Marc Chagall to create new windows for the church in an attempt to reconcile relations between Germany and the Jewish people. After the artist's death in 1985, the windows were completed by Charles Marq. Aside from the Mainz Cathedral, the windows became the most popular religious attraction in the city. He wrote the four-volume collection Die Chagall-Fenster zu St. Stephan in Mainz and his own memoir in 2007, titled Wie ich überlebte. Die Jahre 1933–1945. Until 2019, he held public lectures about the windows several times a month.

Mayer died in Mainz on 16 December 2022, at the age of 99.

== Works ==
- Die Chagall-Fenster zu St. Stephan in Mainz
  - Der Gott der Väter. Das Mittelfenster (1993)
  - "Ich stelle meinen Bogen in die Wolken." Die flankierenden Mittelfenster (1994)
  - Herr, mein Gott, wie groß bist du!. Die seitlichen Fenster (1994)
  - Die Himmel der Himmel fassen dich nicht. Die Querhausfenster. Brief an meinen Freund (1995)
- Psalmen in Bildern (1995)
- Traumbilder (1997)
- St. Stephan in Mainz (2001)
- Zeitzeugenbericht von Monsignore Klaus Mayer (2004)
- Wie ich überlebte. Die Jahre 1933–1945 (2007)

== Documentary ==
- Die Chagall-Fenster in Mainz (SWR Fernsehen, 2007)
