= Georg Scholz (politician) =

German politician (1958–2022)

Member of the Landtag of North Rhine-Westphalia
- In office 2 June 2000 – 2 June 2005

Personal details
- Born: 15 January 1958 Hamm, North Rhine-Westphalia, West Germany
- Died: 14 October 2022 (aged 64)
- Party: SPD
- Education: Ruhr University Bochum
- Occupation: Medical officer

Georg Scholz (15 January 1958 – 14 October 2022) was a German medical officer and politician. A member of the Social Democratic Party, he served in the Landtag of North Rhine-Westphalia from 2000 to 2005.

Scholz died on 14 October 2022, at the age of 64.
