= Mainz =

Capital of Rhineland-Palatinate, Germany

Mainz Määnz / Meenz (Hessian)
- City
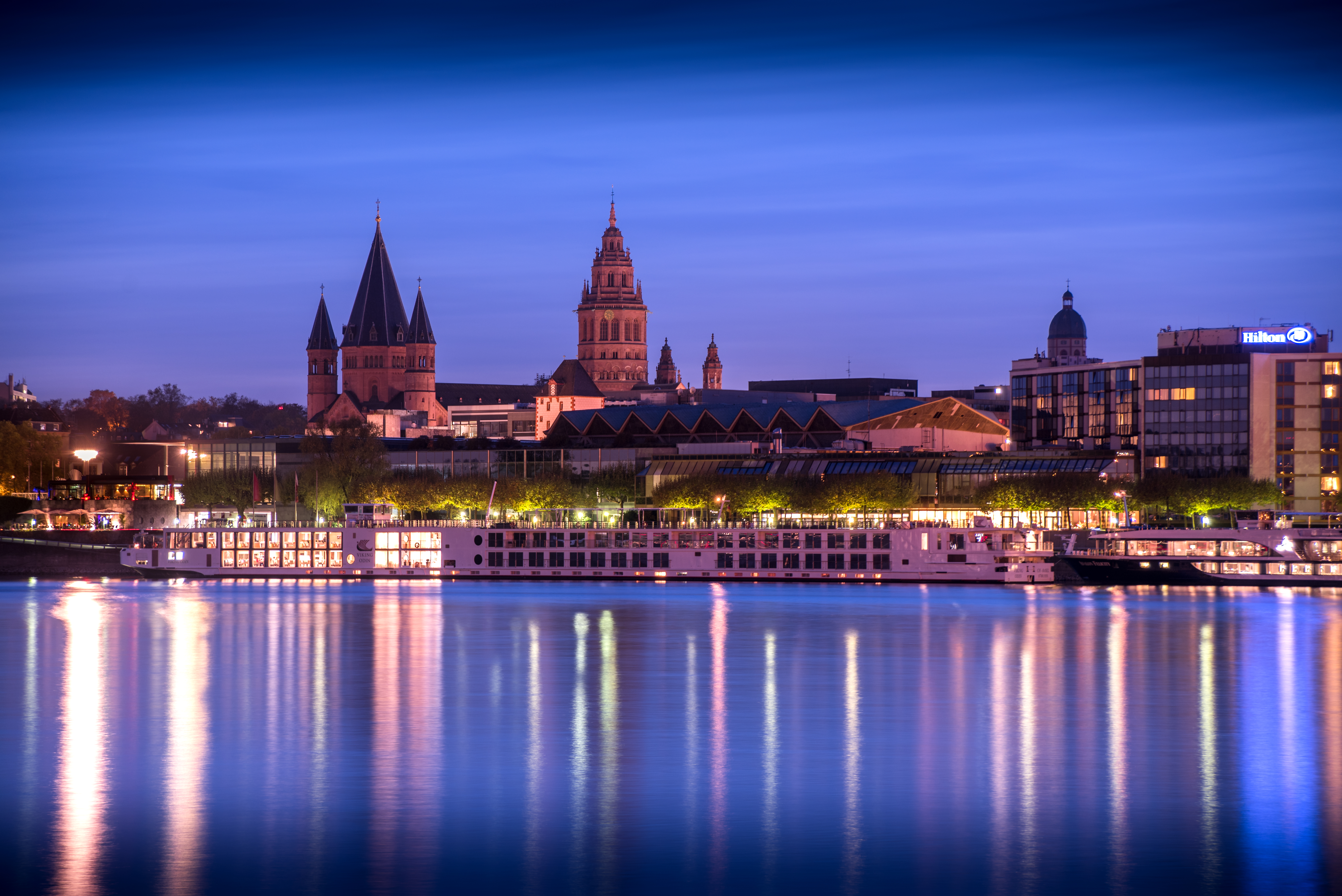
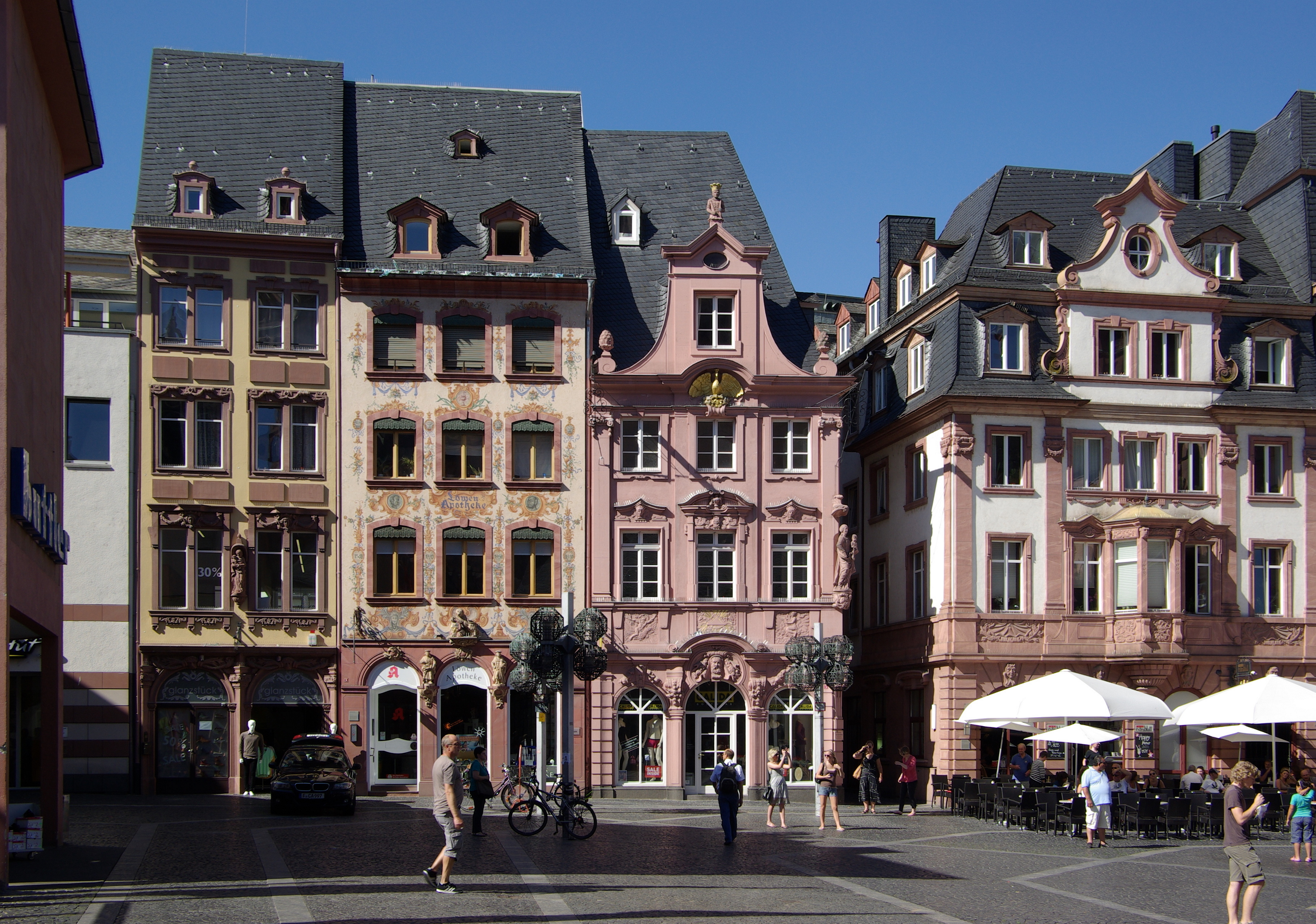
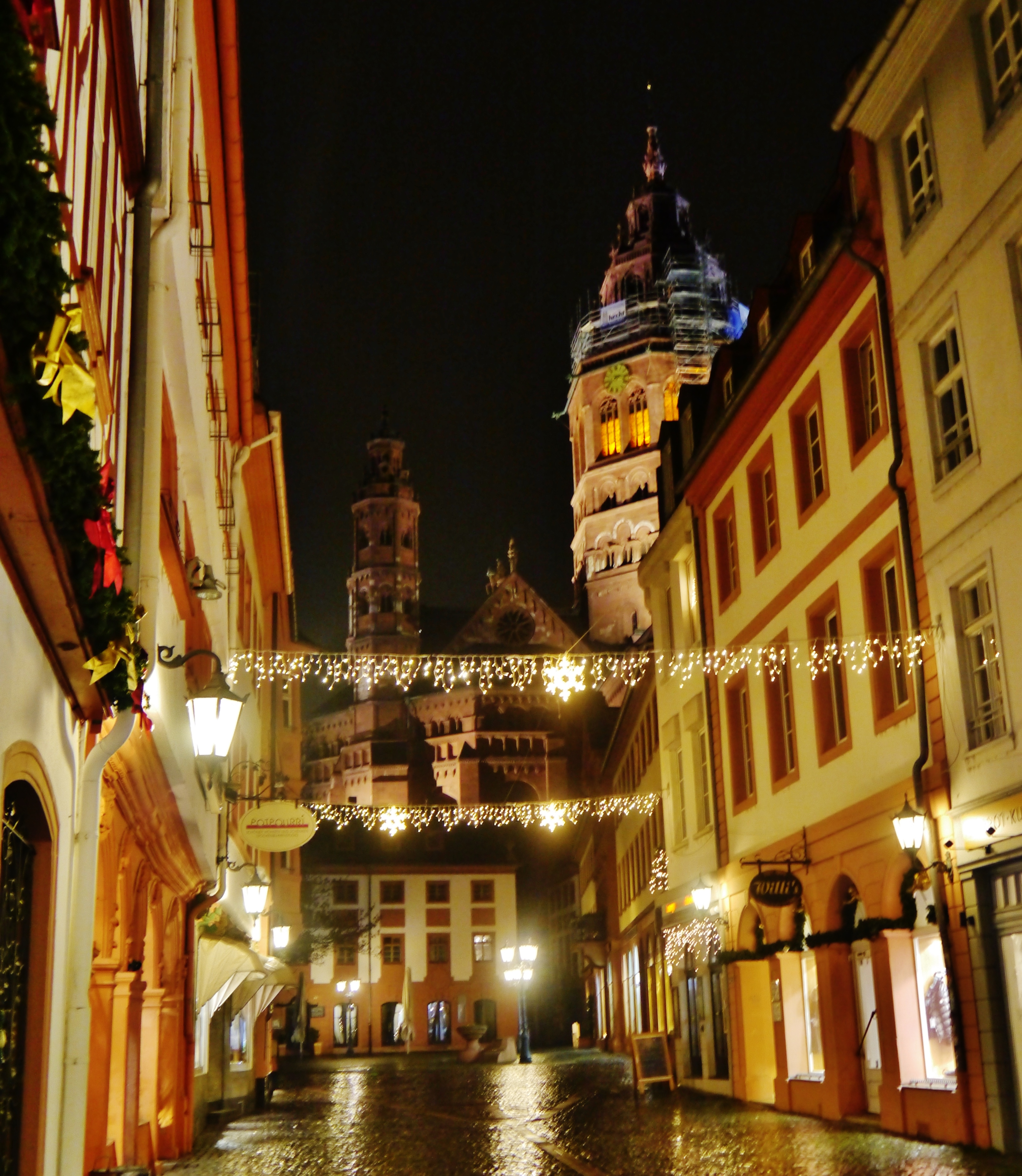
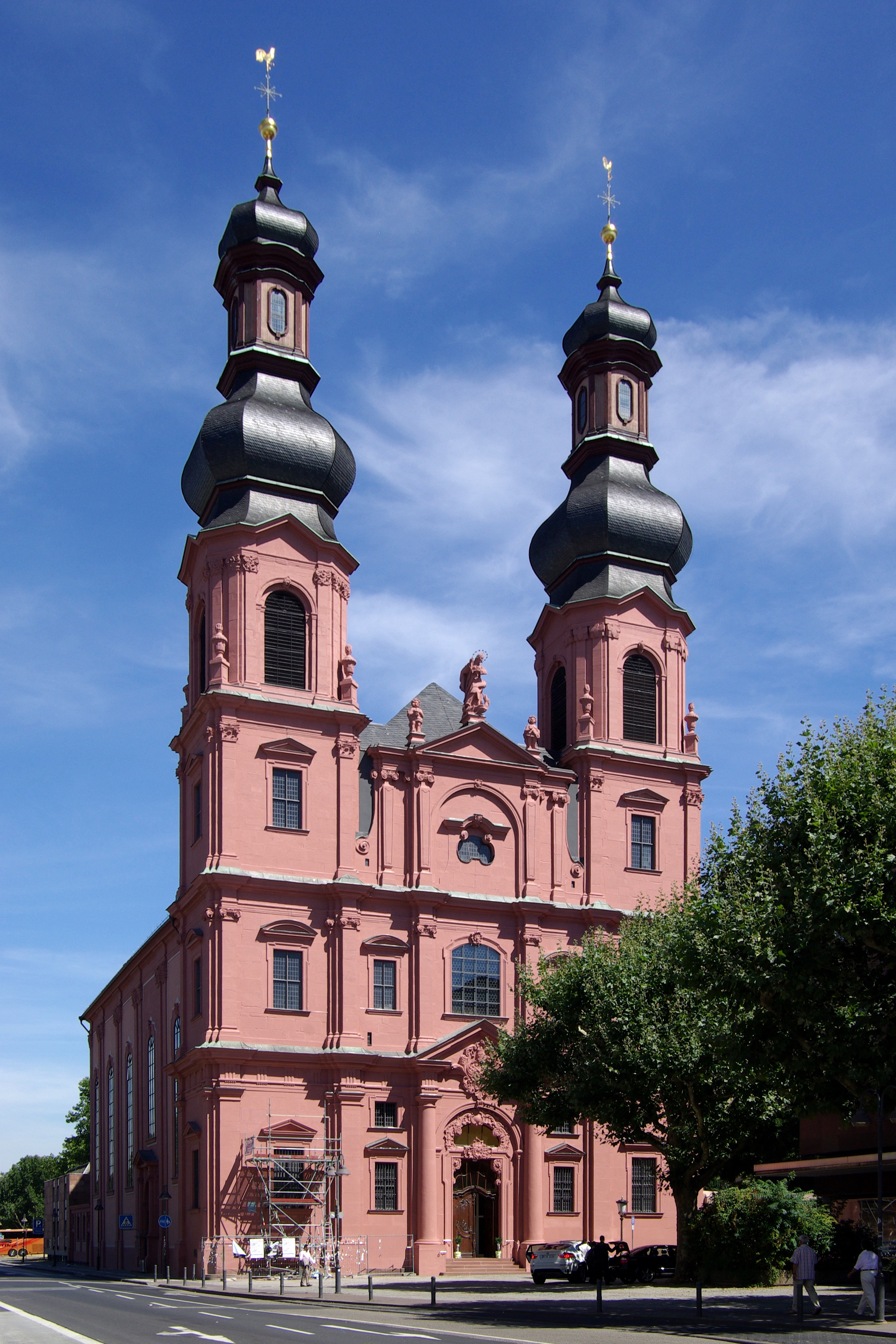
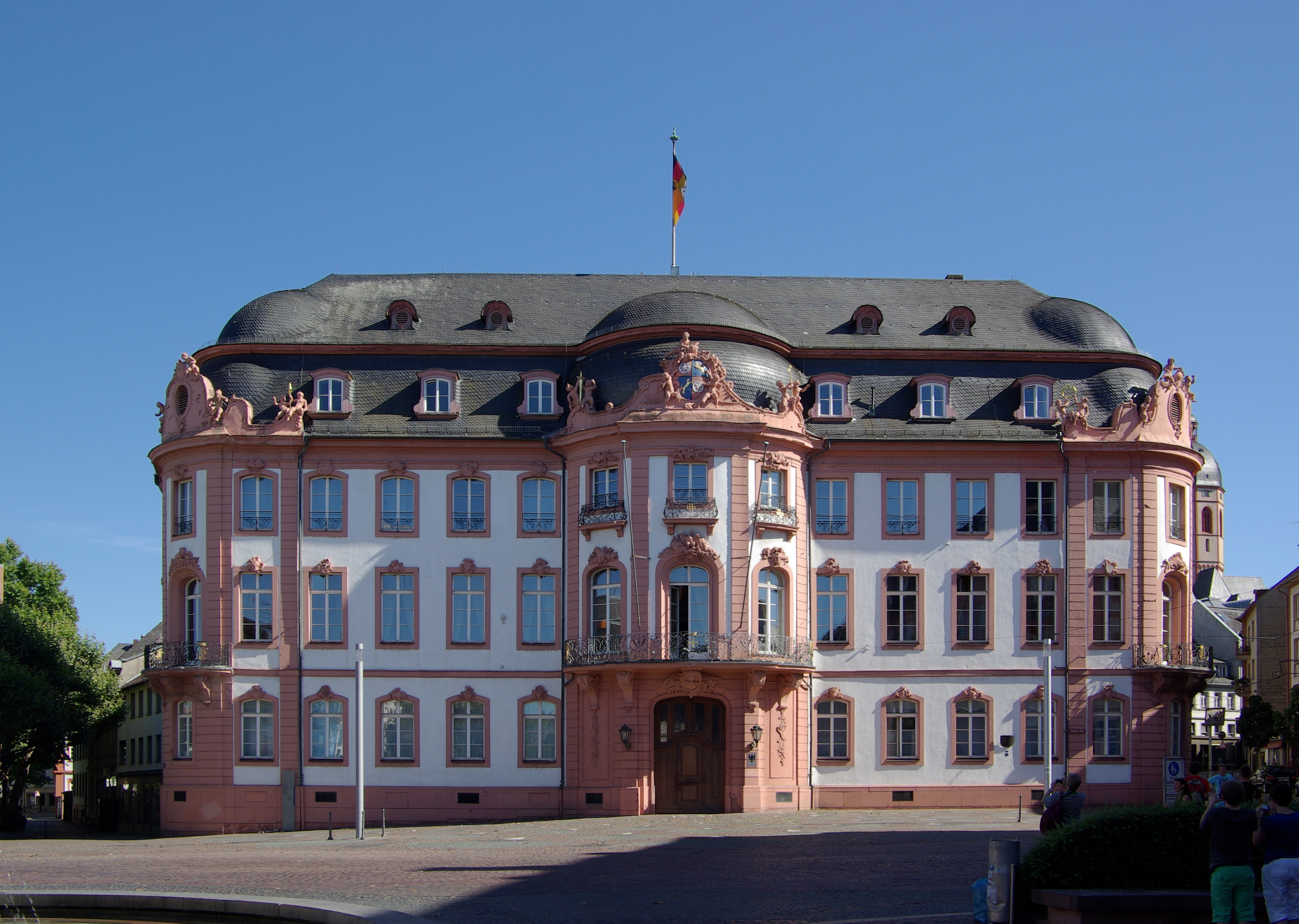
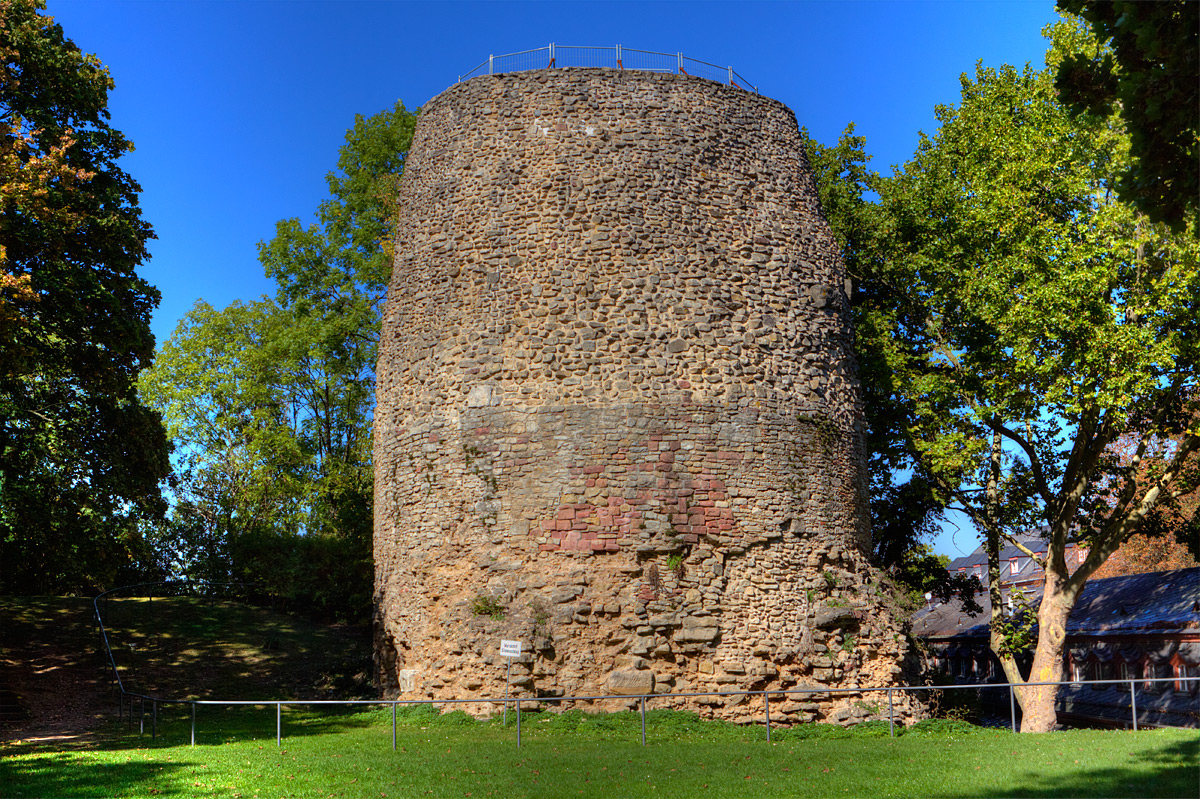
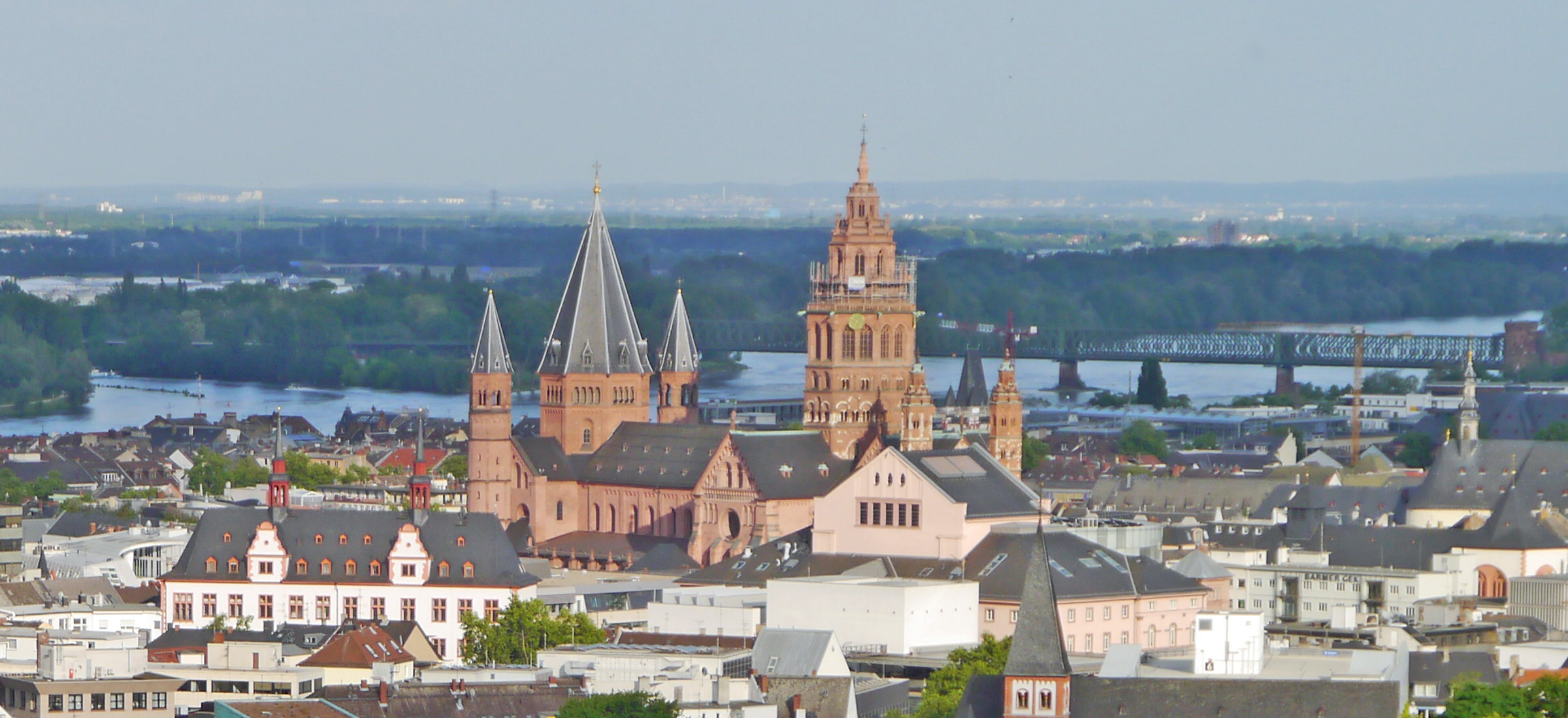
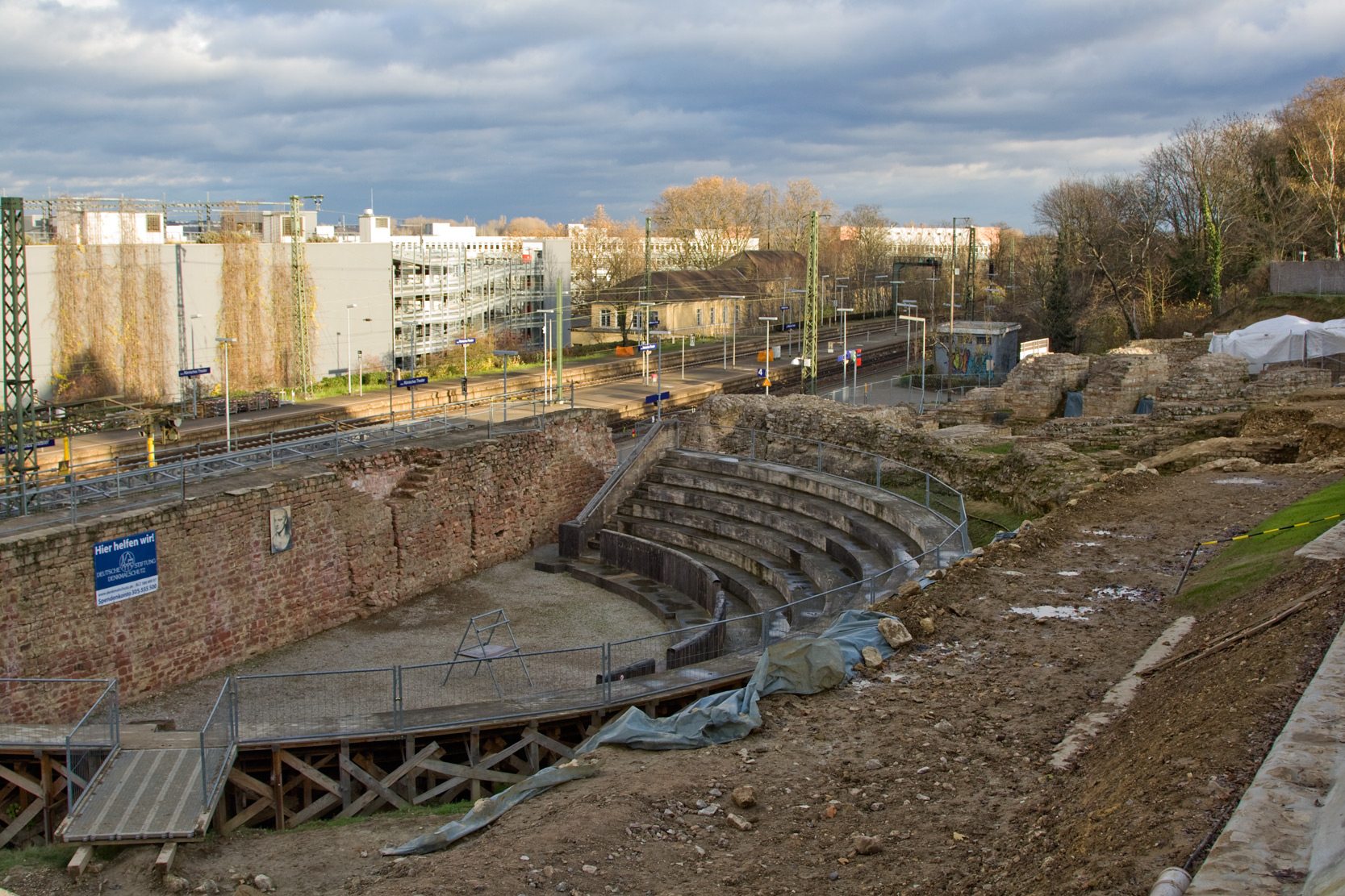
- View of Mainz Cathedral from Wiesbaden Houses on Markt Old Town St. Peter Osteiner Hof Drususstein Mainz Cathedral and Rhine (Upper Rhine) Roman Theatre

- Flag Coat of arms
- Interactive map of Mainz
- Location within Germany Location within Rhineland-Palatinate
- Coordinates: 49°59′58″N 08°16′25″E
- Country: Germany
- State: Rhineland-Palatinate
- District: Urban district
- Founded: 13/12 BC
- Subdivisions: 15 boroughs

Government
  - Mayor (2023—31): Nino Haase (Ind.)

Area
  - Total: 97.75 km^{2} (37.74 sq mi)
- Elevation: 85–285 m (279–935 ft)

Population (2025-12-31)
  - Total: 223,888
  - Density: 2,290/km^{2} (5,932/sq mi)
- Time zone: UTC+01:00 (CET)
  - Summer (DST): UTC+02:00 (CEST)
- Postal codes: 55116–55131
- Dialling codes: 06131, 06136
- Vehicle registration: MZ
- Website: www.mainz.de

UNESCO World Heritage Site
- Official name: ShUM Sites of Speyer, Worms and Mainz
- Type: Cultural
- Criteria: (ii)(iii)(iv)
- Designated: 2021
- Reference no.: 1636

Mainz (German: [maɪnts]; see below) is the capital and largest city of the German state of Rhineland-Palatinate, and with around 223,000 inhabitants, it is Germany's 35th-largest city. It lies in the Rhine-Main Metropolitan Region — Germany's third-largest metropolitan region after Rhine-Ruhr and Berlin-Brandenburg — which also encompasses the cities of Frankfurt am Main, Wiesbaden, Darmstadt, Offenbach am Main, and Hanau.

Mainz is located at the northern end of the Upper Rhine Plain, on the left bank of the Rhine. It is the largest city of Rhenish Hesse, a region of Rhineland-Palatinate that was historically part of Hesse, and is one of Germany's most important wine regions because of its mild climate. Mainz is connected to Frankfurt am Main by the Rhine-Main S-Bahn rapid transit system. Before 1945, Mainz had six boroughs on the other side of the Rhine (see: de:Rechtsrheinische Stadtteile von Mainz). Three have been incorporated into Wiesbaden (see: de:AKK-Konflikt), and three are now independent.

Mainz was founded as Castrum Mogontiacum by Roman general Nero Claudius Drusus in the 1st century BC on the northern frontier of the Roman Empire, and became the capital of the Roman province of Germania Superior. The city was settled by the Franks from 459 on, and in the 8th century it became an important city within the Holy Roman Empire, as capital of the Electorate of Mainz and seat of the Archbishop-Elector of Mainz, the primate of Germany. Mainz Cathedral is one of the three Rhenish Imperial Cathedrals along with Speyer Cathedral and Worms Cathedral. Since the 12th century, Mainz was one of the ShUM-cities — a league formed by the cities of Speyer, Worms and Mainz — which are referred to as the cradle of Ashkenazi Jewish life and as the center of Jewish life during medieval times. The Jewish heritage of these cities is one of a kind, and has been declared the UNESCO World Heritage Site of "ShUM Sites of Speyer, Worms and Mainz". Mainz is the birthplace of Johannes Gutenberg, who invented the printing press and introduced letterpress printing to Europe, starting the global spread of the printing press. Mainz was heavily damaged in World War II; more than 30 air raids destroyed around half of the old town in the city centre, but many buildings were rebuilt post-war.

Like most cities in the Rhineland, Mainz holds extensive carnival celebrations, which are known as the second-most important in Germany, after the celebrations in Cologne.

== Names and etymology ==
Although the city is situated opposite the mouth of the Main, the name of Mainz is not from Main, the similarity being perhaps reinforced by folk-etymological reanalysis. Main is from Latin Moenis (also Moenus or Menus), the name the Romans used for the river. Linguistic analysis of the many forms that the name "Mainz" has taken on makes it clear that it is a simplification of Mogontiacum. The name appears to be Celtic, although it had also become Roman and was selected by them with a special significance. The Roman soldiers defending Gallia had adopted the Gallic god Mogons (Mogounus, Moguns, Mogonino), for the meaning of which etymology offers two basic options: "the great one", similar to Latin magnus, which was used in aggrandizing names such as Alexander magnus, "Alexander the Great" and Pompeius magnus, "Pompey the Great", or the god of "might" personified as it appears in young servitors of any type whether of noble or ignoble birth. (Note: A second hypothesis suggests that Moguns was a wealthy Celt whose estate was taken for the fort and that a tax district was formed on the area parallel to other tax districts with a -iacum suffix (Arenacum, Mannaricium). There is no evidence for this supposedly wealthy man or his estate, but there is plenty for the god. According to Carl Darling Buck in Comparative Grammar of Greek and Latin, -yo- and -k- are general Indo-European formative suffices and are not related to taxes. As the loyalty of the Vangiones was unquestioned and Drusus was campaigning over the Rhine, it is unlikely Mogontiacum would have been built to collect taxes from the Vangiones, who were not a Roman municipium.)

Mainz has a number of different names in other languages and dialects. In Latin it is known as Mogontiacum (pronounced [mɔɡɔnˈti.akũː]) or Moguntiacum and, in the local Hessian dialect, it is Määnz [mɛːnt͡s] or Meenz [meːnt͡s]. It is known as Mayence [majɑ̃s] in French, Magonza [maˈɡontsa] in Italian, Maguncia [maˈɣunθja] in Spanish, Mogúncia [muˈɣũsjɐ] in Portuguese, Moguncja [mɔˈɡunt͡sja] in Polish, Magentza (מגנצא) in Hebrew, and Mohuč in Czech and Slovak (Czech pronunciation: [ˈmoɦutʃ]).

Before the 20th century, Mainz was commonly known in the Anglosphere either as Mentz, its English version, or by its French version Mayence. It is the namesake of two American cities named Mentz.

== Geography ==
=== Topography ===
Mainz is on the 50th latitude north, on the left bank of the Rhine. The east of the city is opposite where the Main falls into it. As of 2021, the population was 217,272. The city is part of the FrankfurtRheinMain area of 5,9 million people. Mainz can easily be reached from Frankfurt International Airport in 30 minutes by commuter railway or regional trains RE 2 RE 3 RB 31.

The river port of Mainz is located on the Rhine and thus on one of the most important waterways in Germany. The container port hub is north of the town centre.

After the last ice age, sand dunes were deposited in the Rhine valley at what was to become the western edge of the city. The Mainz Sand Dunes area is now a nature reserve with a unique landscape and rare steppe vegetation for this area.

While the Mainz legion camp was founded in 13/12 BC on the Kästrich hill, the associated vici and canabae (civilian settlements) were erected towards the Rhine. Historical sources and archaeological findings both prove the importance of the military and civilian Mogontiacum as a port city on the Rhine.

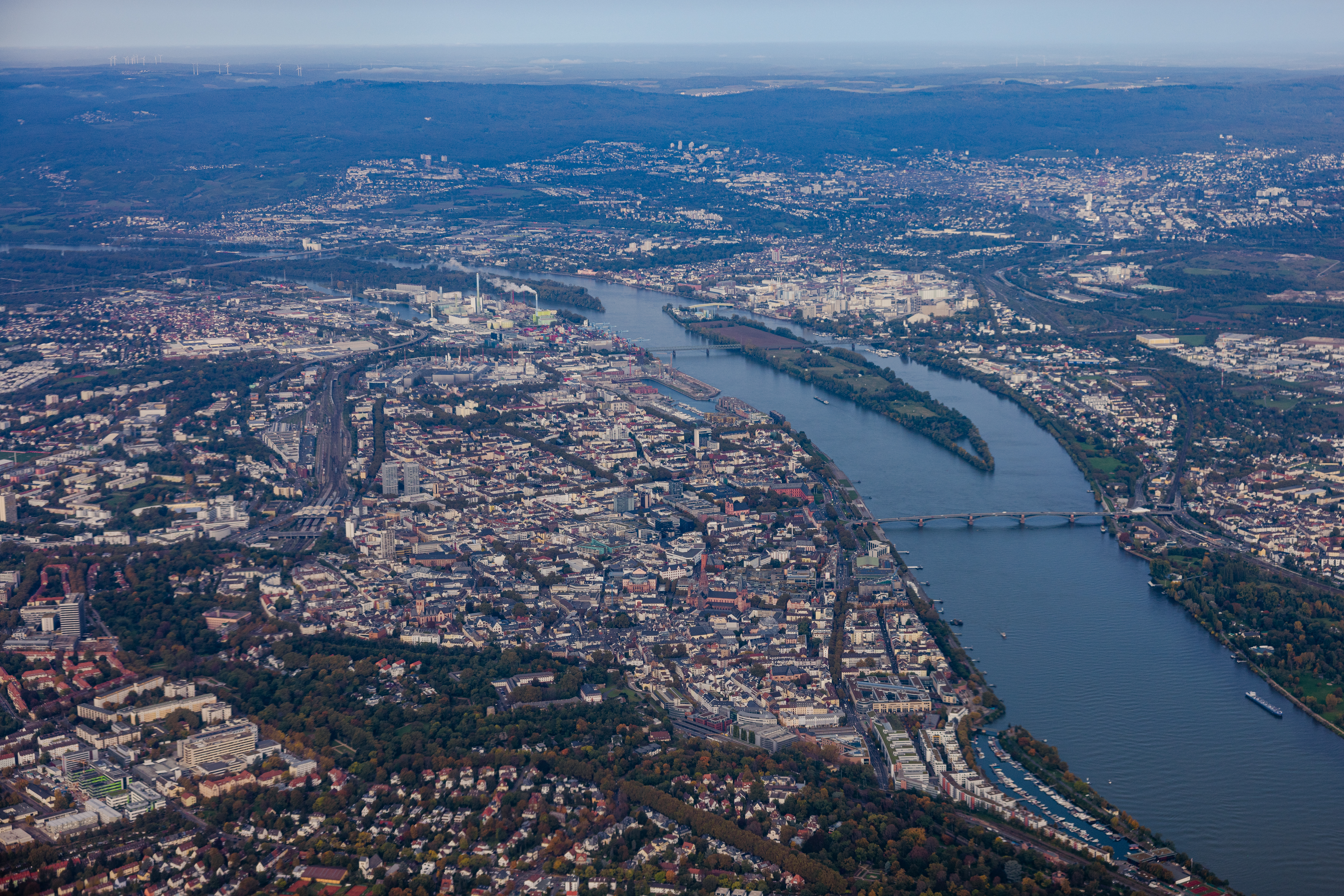
View north along the Rhine with the old Winterhafen in the lower right and the former port facilities further north

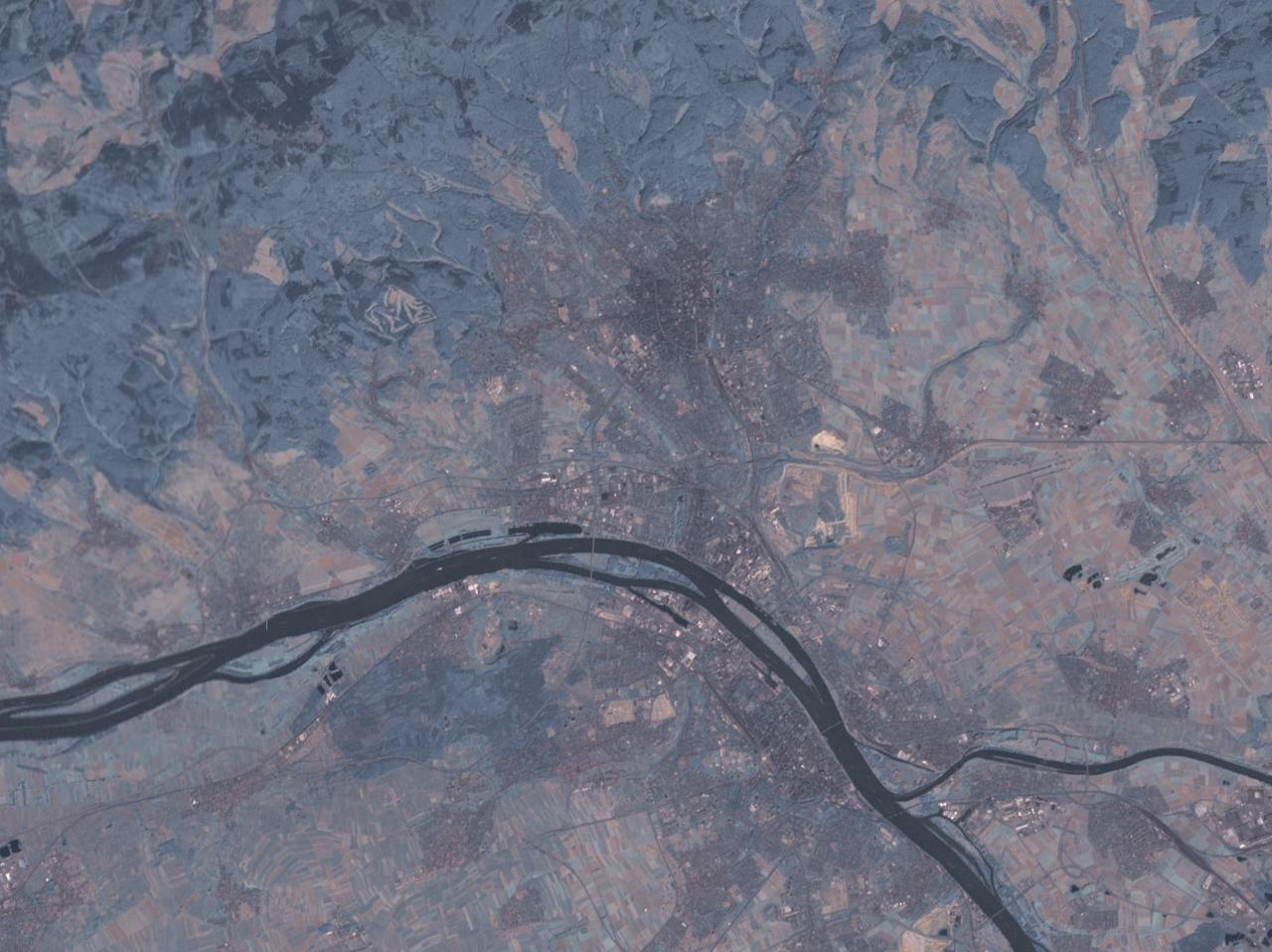
Satellite view of Mainz (south of the Rhine) and Wiesbaden

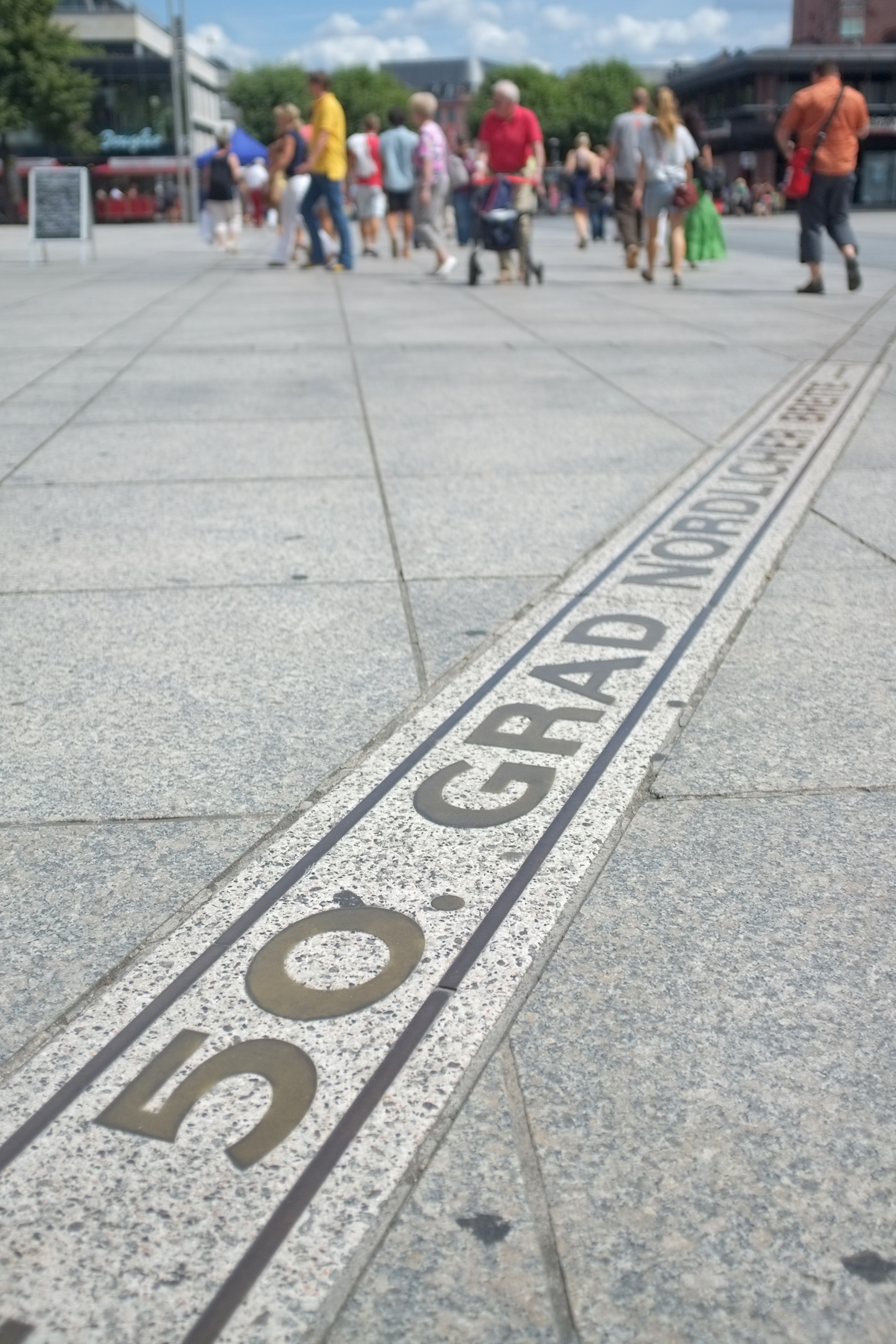
Line showing 50° north latitude on the Gutenbergplatz

=== Climate ===
Mainz features a temperate oceanic climate (Köppen: Cfb, Trewartha: Dobk). The city is one of the warmest in Germany in winter.

== History ==
=== Roman Mogontiacum ===
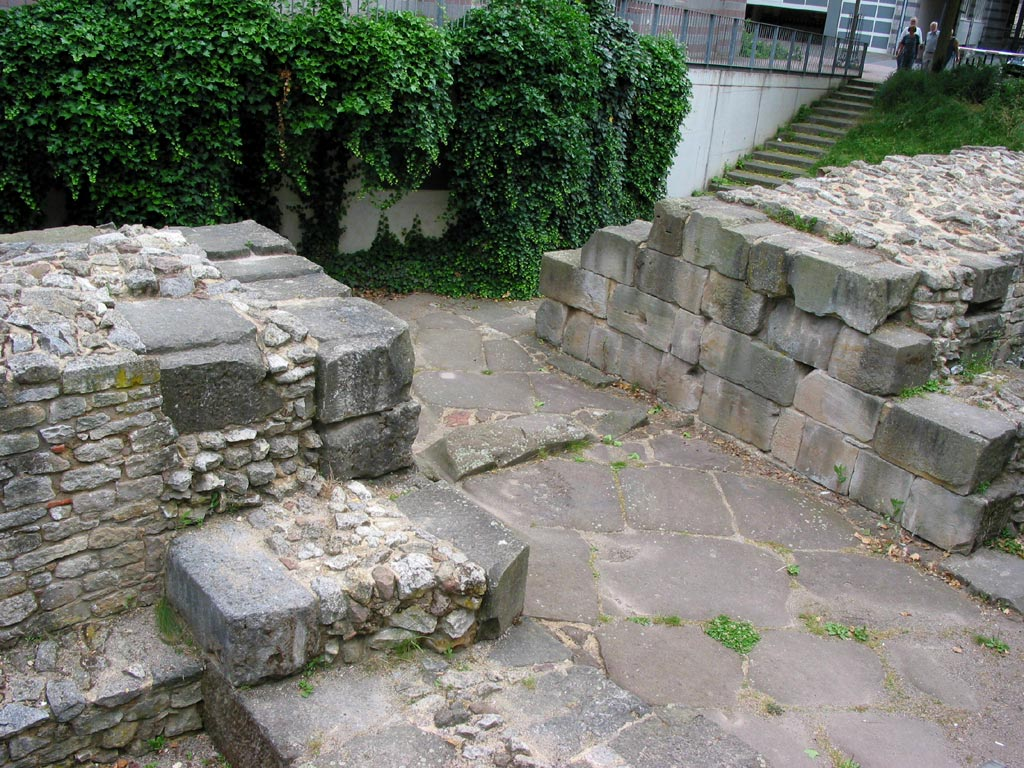
Remains of a Roman town gate from the late 4th century

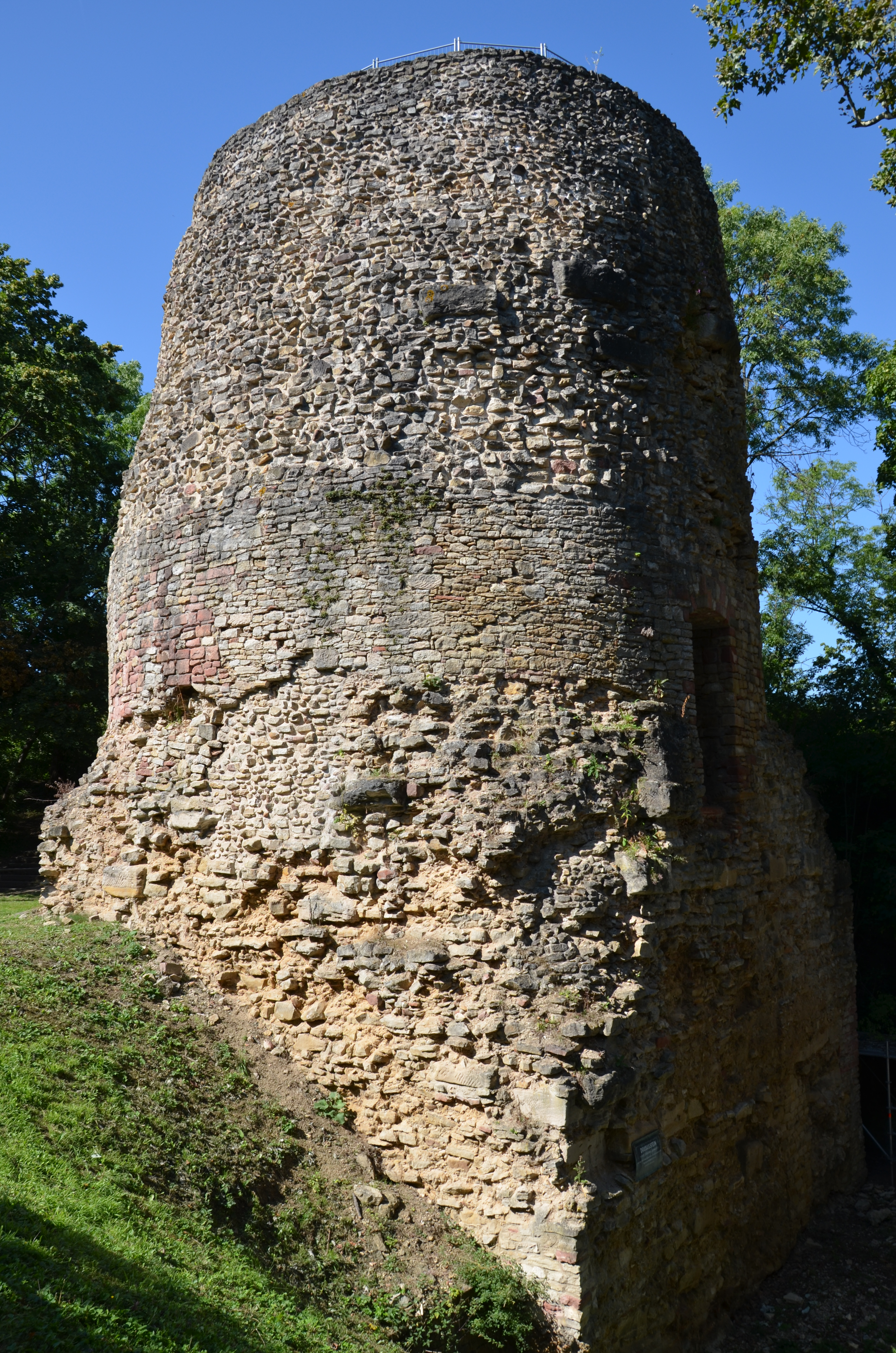
The Drusus monument or Drususstein (surrounded by the 17th century citadel) raised by the troops of Nero Claudius Drusus to commemorate him

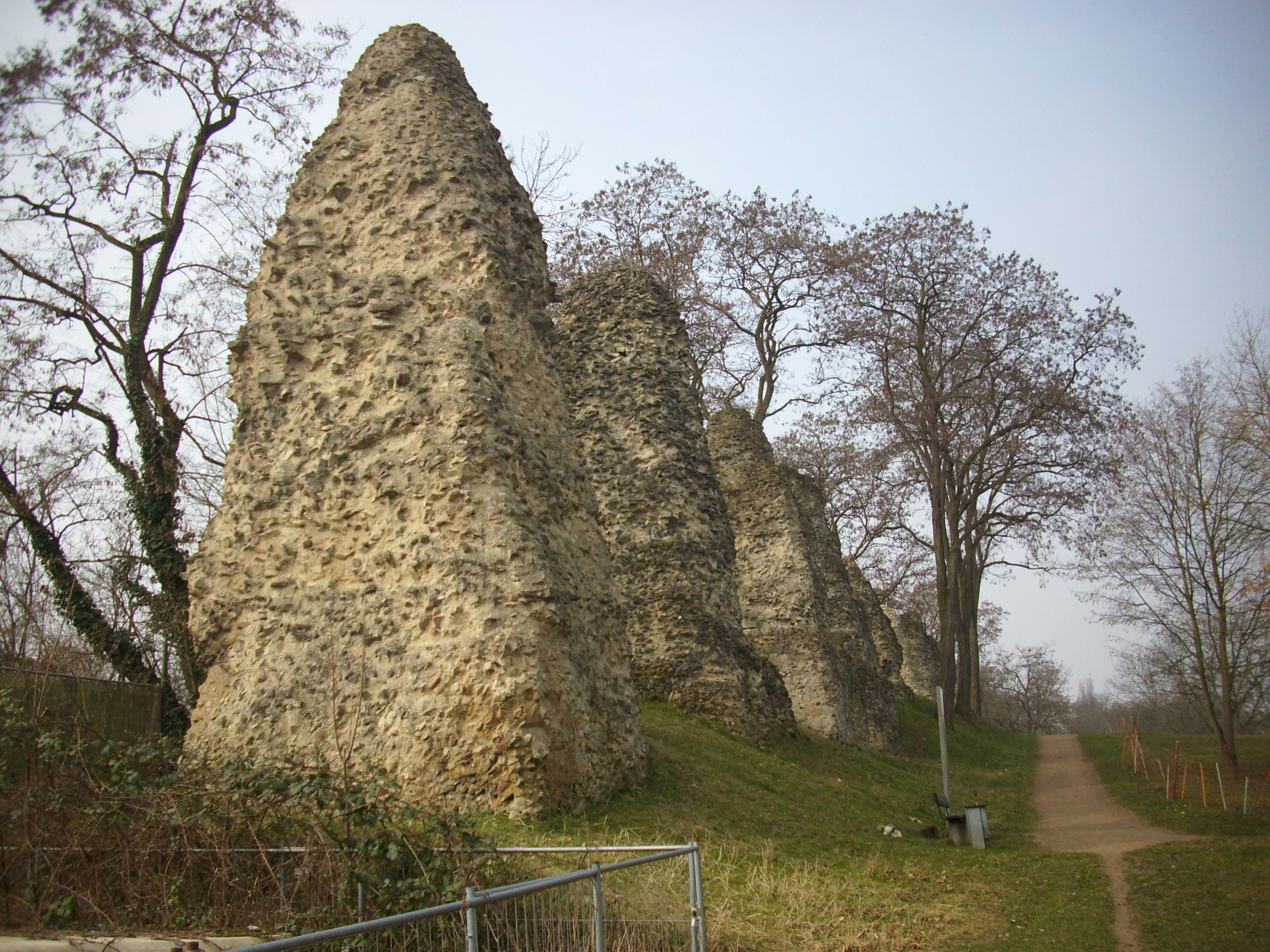
Remains of the Roman aqueduct of Mogontiacum

The Roman stronghold or castrum Mogontiacum, the precursor to Mainz, was founded by the Roman general Drusus, perhaps as early as 13/12 BC. As related by Suetonius the existence of Mogontiacum is well established by four years later (the account of the death and funeral of Nero Claudius Drusus).

Mogontiacum was an important military town throughout Roman times, probably due to its strategic position at the confluence of the Main and the Rhine. The town of Mogontiacum grew up between the fort and the river. The castrum was the base of Legio XIV Gemina and XVI Gallica (AD 9–43), XXII Primigenia, IV Macedonica (43–70), I Adiutrix (70–88), XXI Rapax (70–89), and XIV Gemina (70–92), among others. Mainz was also a base of a Roman river fleet, the Classis Germanica. Remains of Roman troop ships (navis lusoria) and a patrol boat from the late 4th century were discovered in 1982/1986 and may now be viewed in the Museum of Ancient Seafaring. A temple dedicated to Isis Panthea and Magna Mater was discovered in 2000 and is open to the public. The city was the provincial capital of Germania Superior, and had an important funeral monument dedicated to Drusus, to which people made pilgrimages for an annual festival from as far away as Lyon. Among the famous buildings were the largest theatre north of the Alps and a bridge across the Rhine. The city was also the site of the assassination of Emperor Severus Alexander in 235.

Alemanni forces under Rando sacked the city in 368. From the last day of 405 or 406, the Siling and Asding Vandals, the Suebi, the Alans, and other Germanic tribes crossed the Rhine, possibly at Mainz. Christian chronicles relate that the bishop, Aureus, was put to death by the Alemannian Crocus.

Throughout the changes of time, the Roman castrum never seems to have been permanently abandoned as a military installation, which is a testimony to Roman military judgement. Different structures were built there at different times. The current citadel originated in 1660, but it replaced previous forts. It was used in World War II. One of the sights at the citadel is still the cenotaph raised by legionaries to commemorate their general, Drusus.

=== Frankish Mainz ===
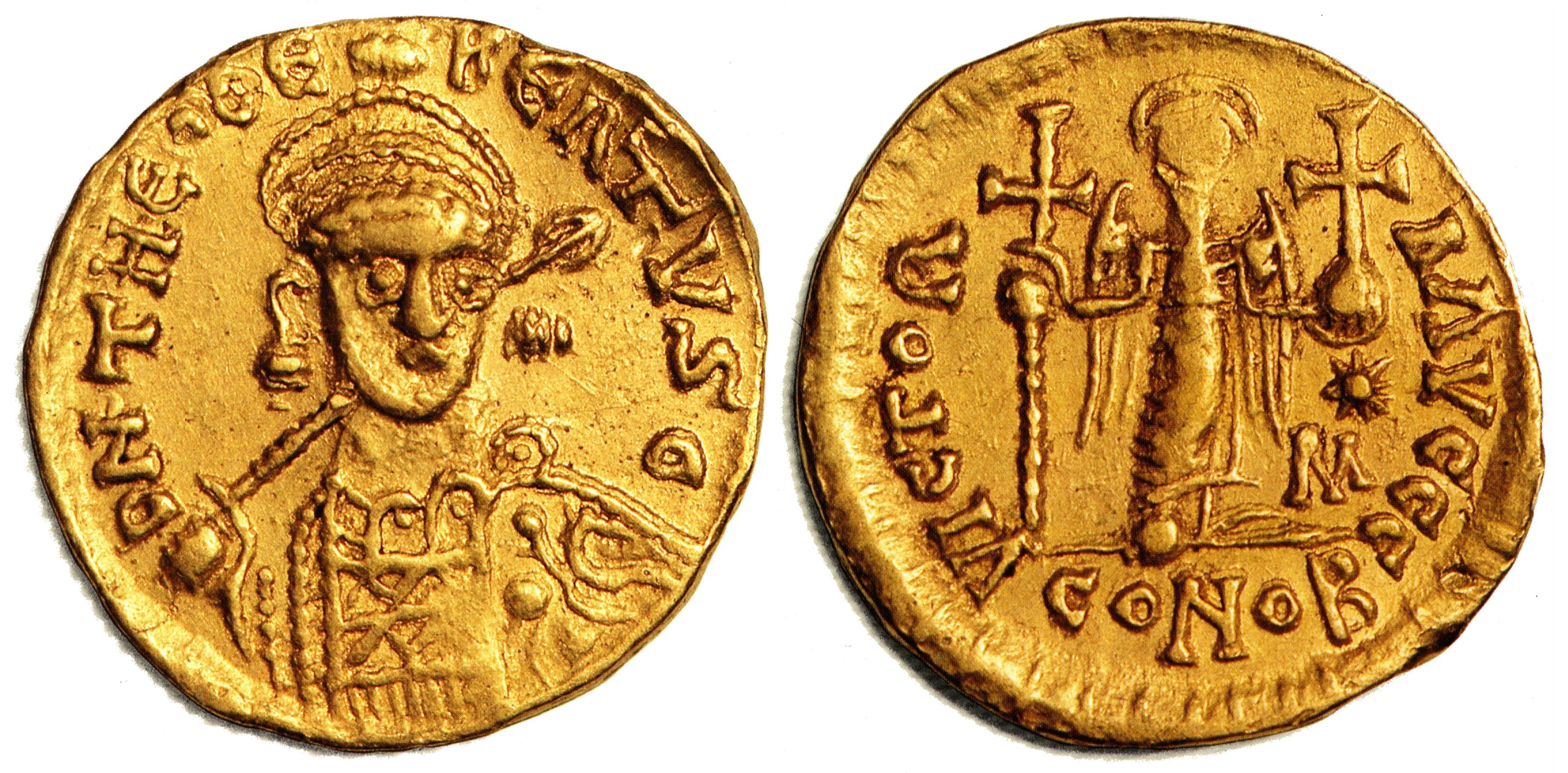
Gold solidus of the Frankish king Theudebert I, Mainz mint, c. 534

In the 4th century, Alemans repeatedly invaded the neighborhood of Mogontiacum. In 357, the city was liberated by the Emperor Julian. The last emperor to station troops serving the western empire at Mainz was Valentinian III (reigned 425–455), who relied heavily on his Magister militum per Gallias, Flavius Aëtius. In 451, Attila's Huns sacked the city.

The Franks from the middle and upper Rhine area took Mainz shortly before 460. After the fall of the Western Roman Empire in 476, the Franks under the rule of Clovis I gained control over western Europe by the year 496. Clovis, son of Childeric, became king of the Salians in 481, ruling from Tournai. He converted from paganism to Catholic Christianity. Theudebert I (c. 500–547 or 548) had installed Sidonius as bishop of Mainz. Dagobert I (605/603–639) reinforced the walls of Mainz.

Charlemagne (768–814), through a succession of wars against other tribes, built a vast Frankish empire in Europe. Mainz from its central location became important to the empire and to Christianity. Meanwhile, language change was gradually working to divide the Franks.

After the death of Charlemagne, distinctions between France and Germany began to be made. The Rhine roughly formed the border of their territories, whereby the three important episcopal cities of Mainz, Worms and Speyer with their counties to the left of the Rhine were assigned to East Francia.

=== Christian Mainz ===
In the early Middle Ages, Mainz played a significant role in the Christianisation of the German and Slavic peoples. The first archbishop in Mainz, Boniface, was killed in 754 while attempting to convert the Frisians to Christianity and is buried in Fulda. The archbishopric of Mainz was established in 781 when Boniface's successor Lullus was granted the pallium by Pope Adrian I. Throughout history, the Archbishops of Mainz held high positions, including serving as archchancellors of the Holy Roman Empire. Notably, the Roman Catholic Diocese of Mainz is unique as it is the only diocese in the world with an episcopal see called a Holy See (sancta sedes).

Ibrahim ibn Yaqub, a 10th-century Hispano-Arabic, Sephardi Jewish traveler, writes the following about the city:

Mainz [Maghānja] is a very large city, partly inhabited and partly cultivated fields. It is in the land of the Franks, on a river called the Rhine [Rīn]. Wheat, barley, rye, grapevines and fruit are plentiful.

In 1244, Archbishop Siegfried III granted Mainz a city charter, allowing the citizens to establish and elect a city council. In 1461, a feud between two archbishops, Diether von Isenburg and Adolf II von Nassau, caused unrest in the city. Following Archbishop Adolf's raid on Mainz in 1462, those who opposed him, including Johannes Gutenberg, were either expelled or imprisoned. Ultimately, after the death of Archbishop Adolf II, Diether von Isenburg was reinstated as the Archbishop of Mainz, duly elected by the chapter and appointed by the Pope.

=== Early Jewish community ===
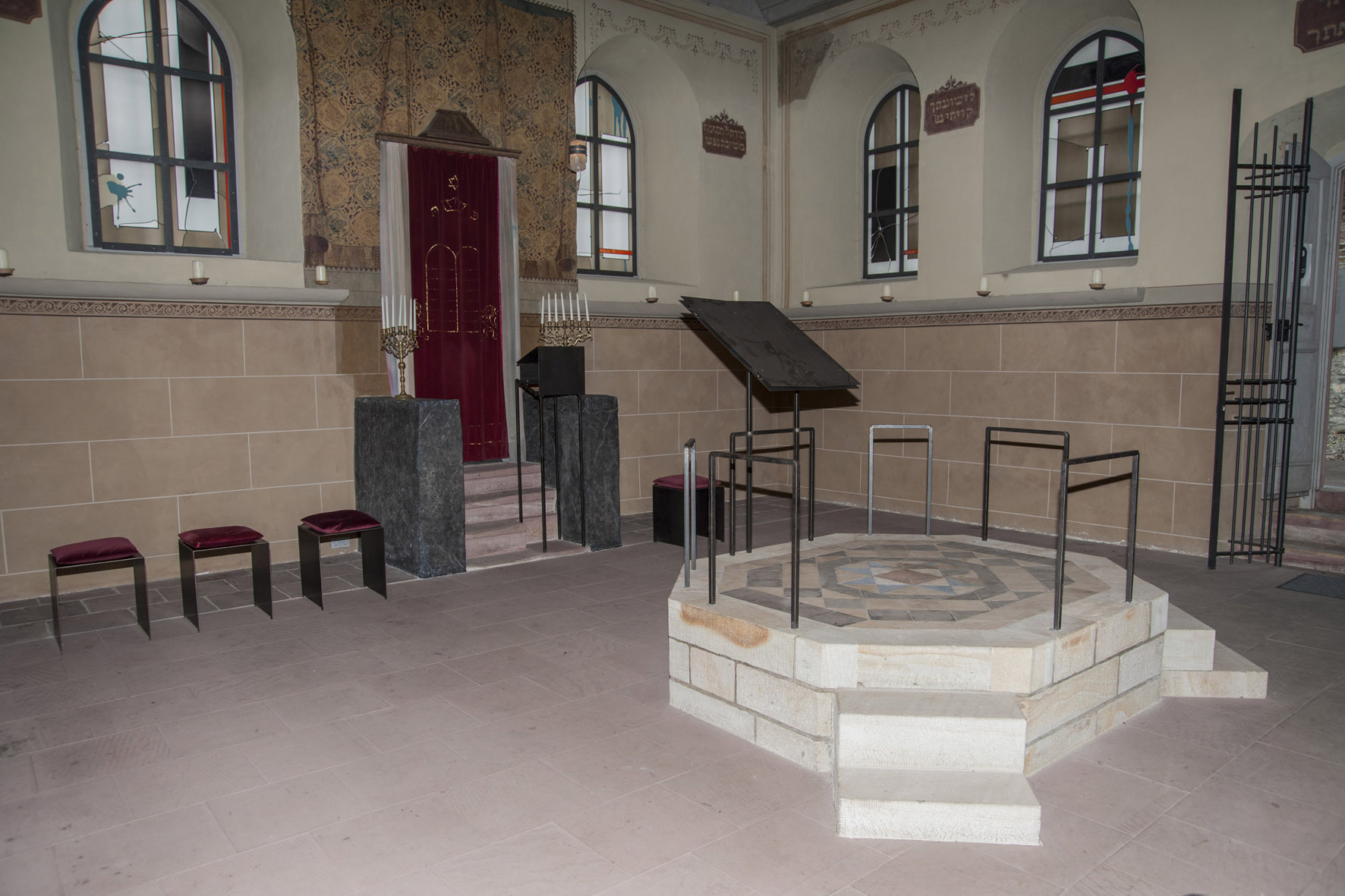
Interior of the Weisenau Synagogue, built in the first half of the 18th century

The Jewish community of Mainz dates back to the 10th century CE. It is noted for its religious education. Rabbi Gershom ben Judah (960–1040) taught there, among others. He concentrated on the study of the Talmud, creating a German Jewish tradition. Mainz is also the legendary home of the martyred Rabbi Amnon of Mainz, that the composition of the Unetanneh Tokef prayer is attributed to him. From the late 12th century rabbis met in synods.

The city of Mainz responded to the Jewish population in a variety of ways, behaving in a capricious manner towards them. Sometimes they were allowed freedom and were protected; at other times, they were persecuted. Jews were attacked in the Rhineland massacres of 1096 and by mobs in 1283. The Jews were expelled in 1438, 1462 (after which they were invited to return), and in 1470. Outbreaks of the Black Death were usually blamed on the Jews, at which times they were massacred, such as the murder of 6000 Jews in 1349.

Outside of the medieval city centre, there is a Jewish cemetery, with over 1500 headstones dating from the 11th through the 19th centuries. The earliest known gravestone is date to 1062 or 1063, and these early gravestones resemble those found in Italy in the 8th–9th centuries.

=== Republic of Mainz ===
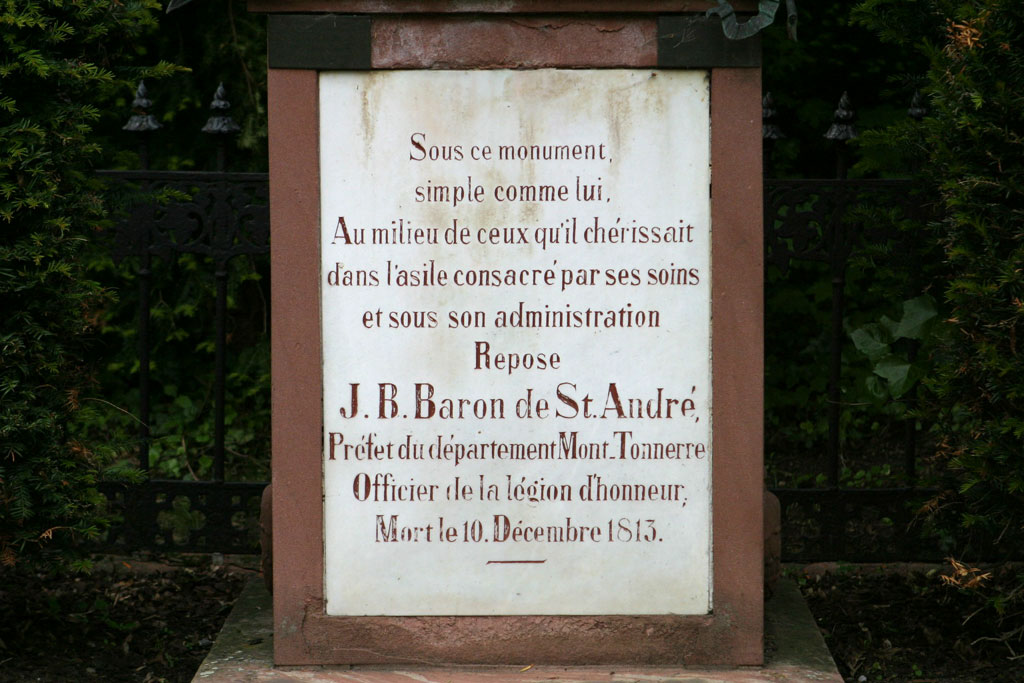
Tombstone of Jeanbon Baron de St. André, Prefect of Napoleonic Mainz

During the French Revolution, the French Revolutionary army occupied Mainz in 1792; the Archbishop-elector of Mainz, Friedrich Karl Josef von Erthal, had already fled to Aschaffenburg by the time the French marched in. On 18 March 1793, the Jacobins of Mainz, with other German democrats from about 130 towns in the Rhenish Palatinate, proclaimed the "Republic of Mainz". Led by Georg Forster, representatives of the Mainz Republic in Paris requested political affiliation of the Mainz Republic with France, but too late: Prussia was not entirely happy with the idea of a democratic free state on German soil (although the French dominated Mainz was neither free nor democratic). Prussian troops had already occupied the area and besieged Mainz by the end of March 1793. After a siege of 18 weeks, the French troops in Mainz surrendered on 23 July 1793; the Prussians occupied the city and ended the Republic of Mainz. It came to the Battle of Mainz in 1795 between Austria and France. Members of the Mainz Jacobin Club were mistreated or imprisoned and punished for treason.

In 1797, the French returned. The army of Napoleon Bonaparte occupied the German territory to the west of the Rhine, and the Treaty of Campo Formio awarded France this entire area, initially as the Cisrhenian Republic. On 17 February 1800, the French Département du Mont-Tonnerre was founded here, with Mainz as its capital, the Rhine being the new eastern frontier of la Grande Nation. Austria and Prussia could not but approve this new border with France in 1801. However, after several defeats in Europe during the War of the Sixth Coalition, the weakened Napoleon and his troops had to leave Mainz in May 1814.

=== Rhenish Hesse ===
In 1816, the part of the former French Département which is known today as Rhenish Hesse (German: Rheinhessen) was awarded to the Hesse-Darmstadt, Mainz being the capital of the new Hessian province of Rhenish Hesse. From 1816 to 1866, a part of the German Confederation, Mainz was the most important fortress in the defence against France, and had a strong garrison of Austrian, Prussian and Bavarian troops.

On the afternoon of 18 November 1857, a huge explosion rocked Mainz when the city's powder magazine, the Pulverturm, exploded. Approximately 150 people were killed and at least 500 injured; 57 buildings were destroyed and a similar number severely damaged in what was to be known as the Powder Tower Explosion or Powder Explosion.

During the Austro-Prussian War in 1866, Mainz was declared a neutral zone. After the founding of the German Empire in 1871, Mainz no longer was as important a stronghold, because in the Franco-Prussian War France had lost the territory of Alsace-Lorraine to Germany (which France had occupied bit by bit from 1630 to 1795), and this defined the new border between the two countries.

=== Industrial expansion ===
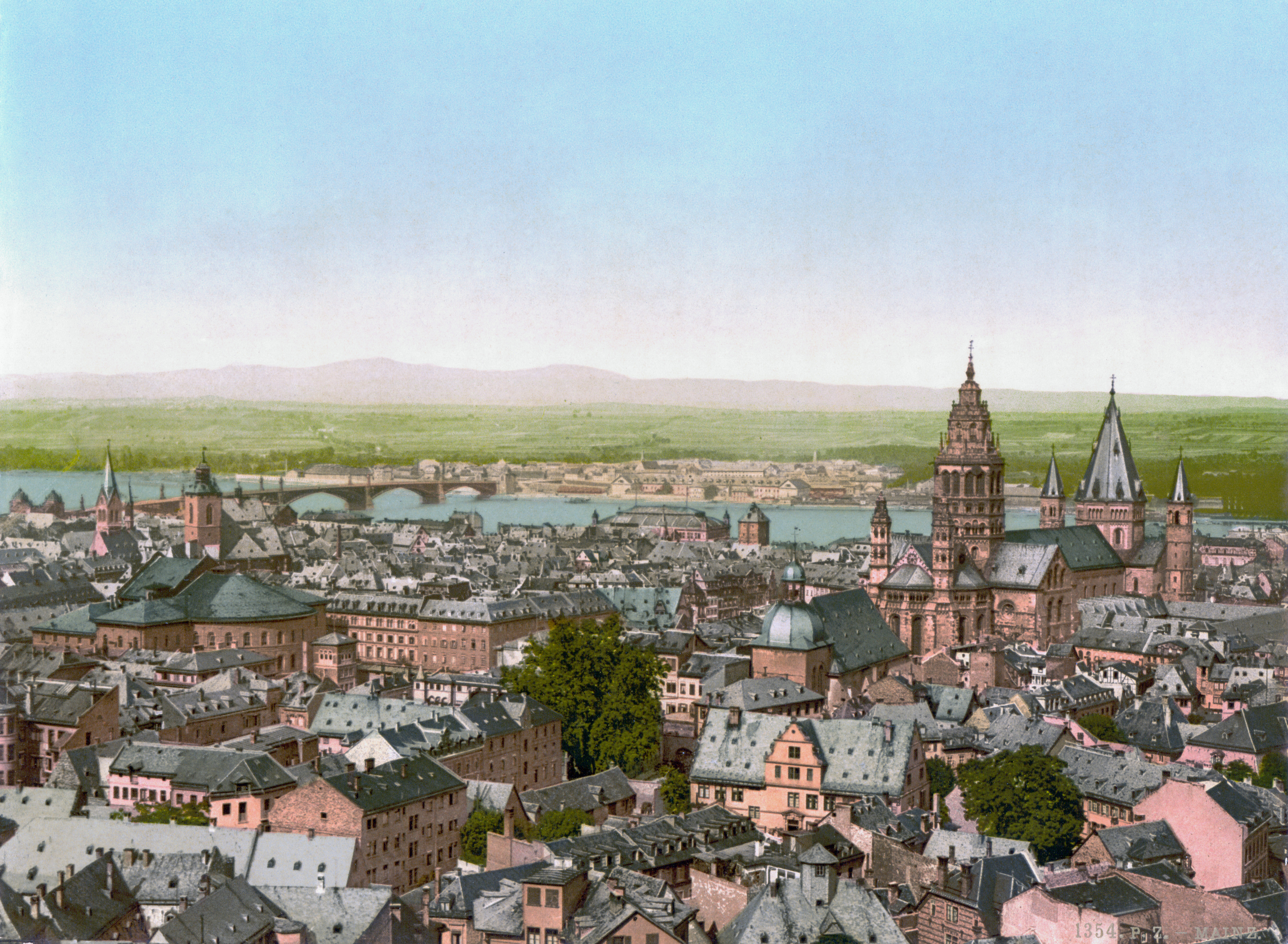
Mainz towards the Rhine (around 1890)

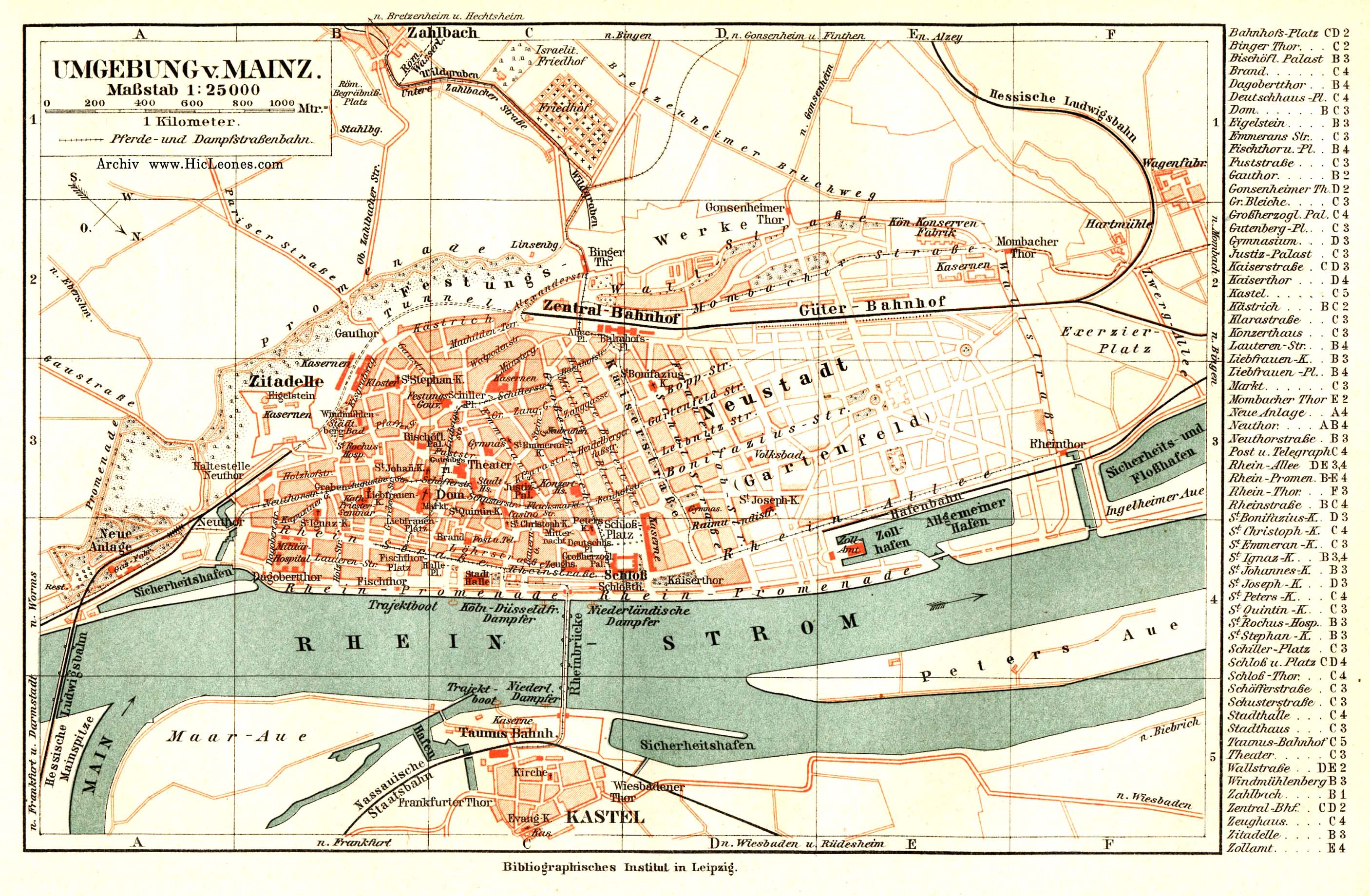
Mainz including expansion zone upstream the Rhine (1898)

For centuries, the inhabitants of the fortress of Mainz had suffered from a severe shortage of space which led to disease and other inconveniences. In 1872, Mayor Carl Wallau and the council of Mainz persuaded the military government to sign a contract to expand the city. Beginning in 1874, the city of Mainz assimilated the Gartenfeld, an idyllic area of meadows and fields along the banks of the Rhine to the north of the rampart. The city expansion more than doubled the urban area which allowed Mainz to participate in the Industrial Revolution which had previously avoided the city for decades.

Eduard Kreyßig was the man who made this happen. Having been the master-builder of the city of Mainz since 1865, Kreyßig had the vision for the new part of town, the Neustadt. He also planned the first sewer system for the old part of town since Roman times and persuaded the city government to relocate the railway line from the Rhine side to the west end of the town. The main station was built from 1882 to 1884 according to the plans of Philipp Johann Berdellé.

Kreyßig constructed a number of state-of-the-art public buildings, including the Mainz town hall – which was the largest of its kind in Germany at that time – as well a synagogue, the Rhine harbour and a number of public baths and school buildings. Kreyßig's last work was Christ Church (Christuskirche), the largest Protestant church in the city and the first building constructed solely for the use of a Protestant congregation. In 1905 the demolition of the entire circumvallation and the Rheingauwall was taken in hand, according to the imperial order of Wilhelm II.

=== 20th century ===
During the German Revolution of 1918 the Mainz Workers' and Soldiers' Council was formed which ran the city from 9 November until the arrival of French troops under the terms of the occupation of the Rhineland agreed in the Armistice. The French occupation was confirmed by the Treaty of Versailles which went into effect 28 June 1919. The Rhineland (in which Mainz is located) was to be a demilitarised zone until 1935 and the French garrison, representing the Triple Entente, was to stay until reparations were paid.

In 1923 Mainz participated in the Rhineland separatist movement that proclaimed a Rhenish Republic. It collapsed in 1924. The French withdrew on 30 June 1930. Adolf Hitler became chancellor of Germany in January 1933 and his political opponents, especially those of the Social Democratic Party, were either incarcerated or murdered. Some were able to move away from Mainz in time. One was the political organizer for the SPD, Friedrich Kellner, who went to Laubach, where, as the chief justice inspector of the district court, he continued his opposition against the Nazis by recording their misdeeds in a 900-page diary.

In March 1933, a detachment from the National Socialist Party in Worms brought the party to Mainz. They hoisted the swastika on all public buildings and began to denounce the Jewish population in the newspapers. In 1936, the Nazis remilitarized the Rhineland with great fanfare, the first move of Nazi Germany's meteoric expansion. The former Triple Entente took no action.

During World War II the citadel at Mainz hosted the Oflag XII-B prisoner of war camp. The city was also the location of four subcamps of the Hinzert concentration camp, mostly for Luxembourgish, Polish, Dutch and Soviet prisoners, but also Belgian, French and Italian.

During World War II, several air raids destroyed about 80 percent of the city's centre, including most of the historic buildings. Mainz was captured on 22 March 1945 against uneven German resistance (staunch in some sectors and weak in other parts of the city) by the 90th Infantry Division under William A. McNulty, a formation of the XII Corps under Third Army commanded by General George S. Patton Jr.

From 1945 to 1949, the city was part of the French zone of occupation. When the state of Rhineland-Palatinate was founded on 30 August 1946 by the commander of the French army on the French occupation zone Marie Pierre Kœnig, Mainz became the capital of the new state. In 1962, the diarist, Friedrich Kellner, returned to spend his last years in Mainz. His life in Mainz, and the impact of his writings, is the subject of the Canadian documentary My Opposition: The Diaries of Friedrich Kellner.

Following the withdrawal of French forces from Mainz, the United States Army Europe occupied the military bases in Mainz.

=== Recent history ===
Nowadays the Jewish community is growing rapidly, and a new synagogue by the architect Manuel Herz was constructed in 2010 on the site of the one destroyed by the Nazis on Kristallnacht in 1938. As of 2021, the Jewish community Mainz has 985 members.

Today the United States Army Europe and Africa only occupies McCulley Barracks in Wackernheim and the Mainz Sand Dunes as training areas. Mainz is home to the headquarters of the Bundeswehr's Landeskommando Rhineland-Palatinate and other units.

== Cityscape ==
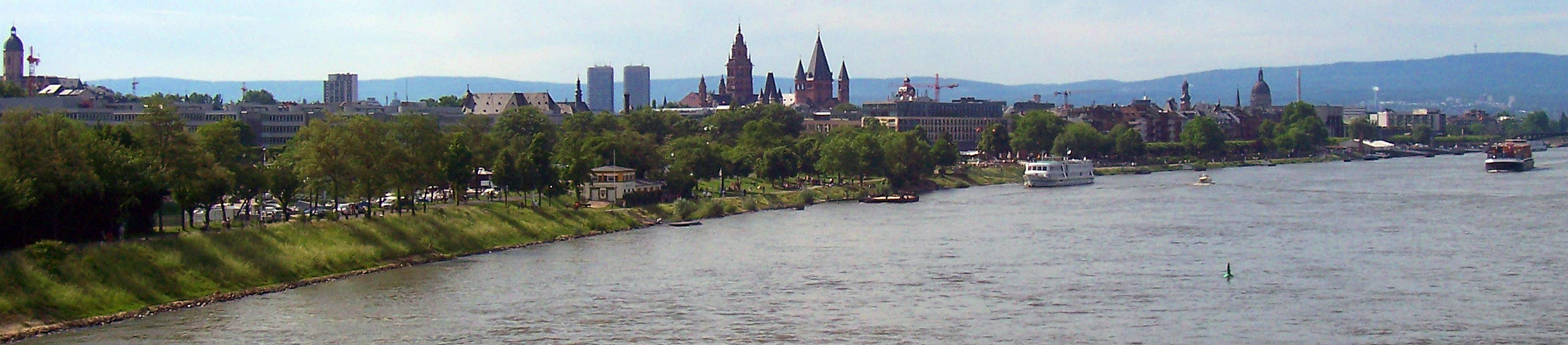
Mainz skyline May 2007, from South Railway bridge over the Rhine looking north
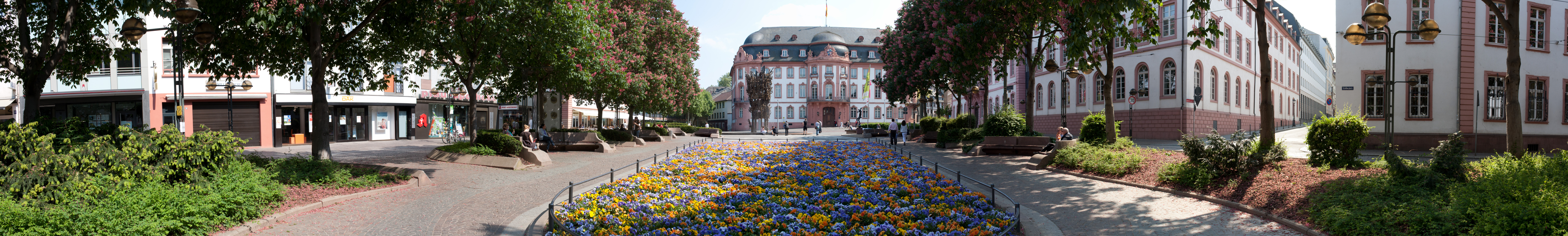
Mainz May 2011, Schillerplatz, looking southeast
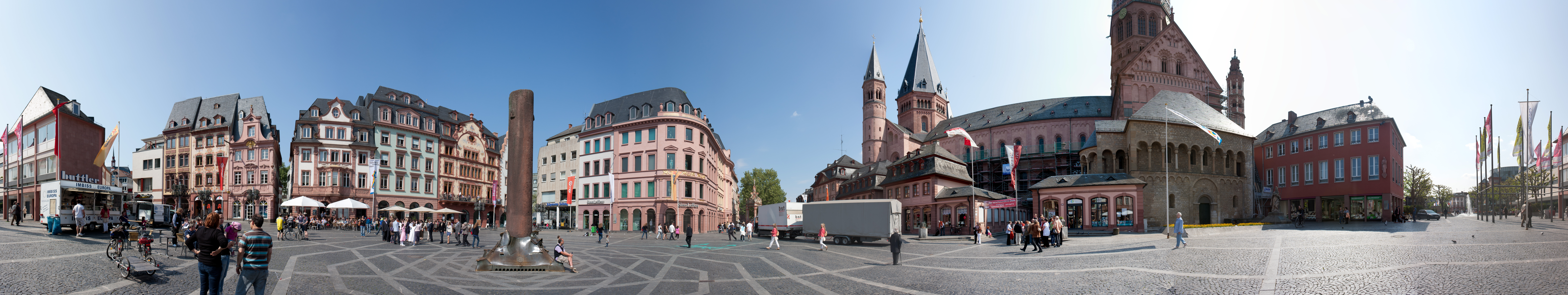
Market square and cathedral

=== Architecture ===
The destruction caused by the Bombing of Mainz in World War II led to the most intense phase of building in the history of the town. During the last war in Germany, more than 30 air raids destroyed about 80 per cent of the city's centre, including most of the historic buildings. The attack on the afternoon of 27 February 1945 remains the most destructive of all 33 bombings that Mainz has suffered in World War II in the collective memory of most of the population living then. This air raid made an already hard-hit city even more levelled.

Nevertheless, the post-war reconstruction took place very slowly. While cities such as Frankfurt had been rebuilt fast by a central authority, only individual efforts were initially successful in rebuilding Mainz. The reason for this was that the French wanted Mainz to expand and become a model city. Mainz lay within the French-controlled sector of Germany and it was a French architect and town-planner, Marcel Lods, who produced a Le Corbusier-style plan of an ideal architecture. But the first interest of the inhabitants was the restoration of housing areas. Even after the failure of the model city plans it was the initiative of the French (founding of the Johannes Gutenberg University of Mainz, elevation of Mainz to the state capital of Rhineland-Palatinate, the early resumption of the Mainz carnival) driving the city in a positive development after the war. The City Plan of 1958 by Ernst May allowed a regulated reconstruction for the first time. In 1950, the seat of the government of Rhineland-Palatinate had been transferred to the new Mainz and in 1963, the seat of the new ZDF, notable architects were Adolf Bayer, Richard Jörg and Egon Hartmann. At the time of the two-thousand-years-anniversary in 1962 the city was largely reconstructed. During the 1950s and 1960s, the Oberstadt had been extended, Münchfeld and Lerchenberg added as suburbs, the Altstadttangente (intersection of the old town), new neighbourhoods as Westring and Südring contributed to the extension. By 1970, there remained only a few ruins. The new town hall of Mainz had been designed by Arne Jacobsen and finished by Dissing+Weitling. The town used Jacobsens activity for the Danish Novo company erecting a new office and warehouse building to contact him. The urban renewal of the old town changed the inner city. In the framework of the preparation of the cathedral's millennium, pedestrian zones were developed around the cathedral, in a northern direction to the Neubrunnenplatz and in a southern direction across the Leichhof to the Augustinerstraße and Kirschgarten. The 1980s brought the renewal of the façades on the Markt and a new inner-city neighbourhood on the Kästrich. During the 1990s the Kisselberg and the "Fort Malakoff Center" at the site of the old police barracks were built.

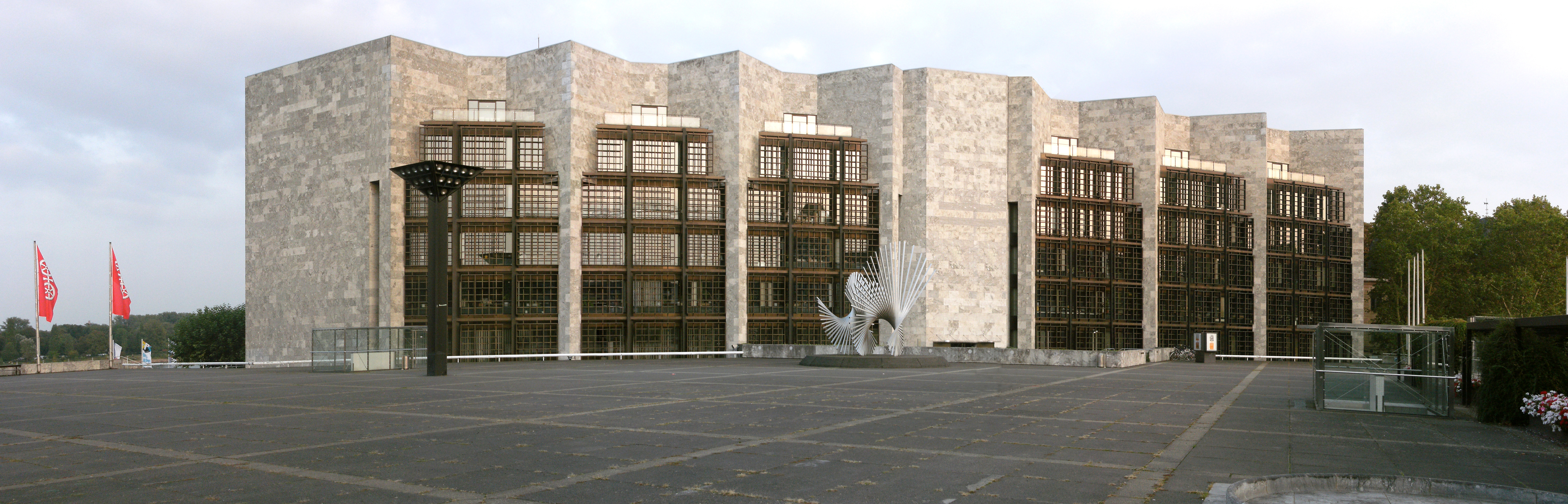
Town Hall by Jacobsen

== Main sights ==
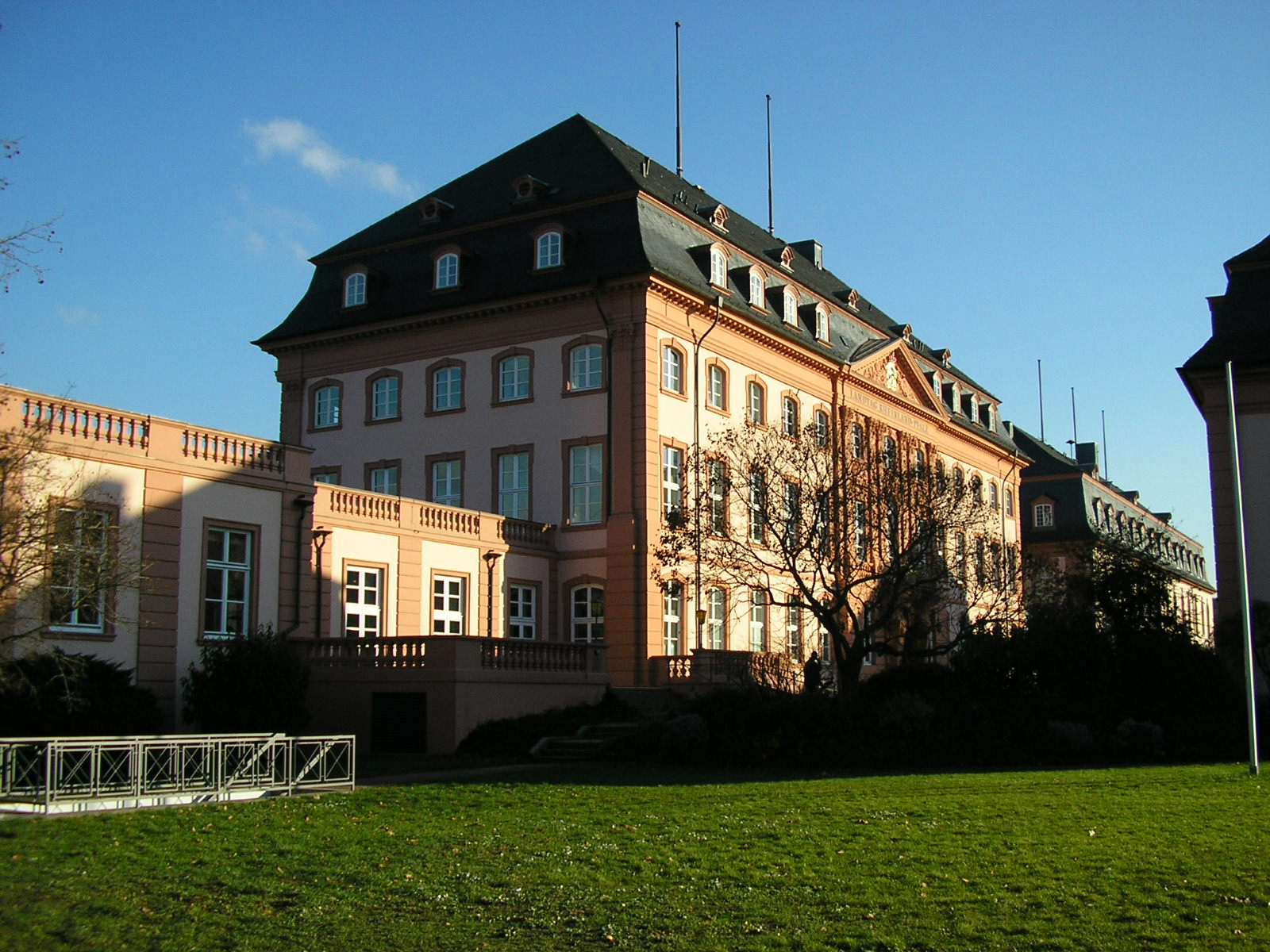
The Deutschhaus, the House of Parliament of Rhineland-Palatinate

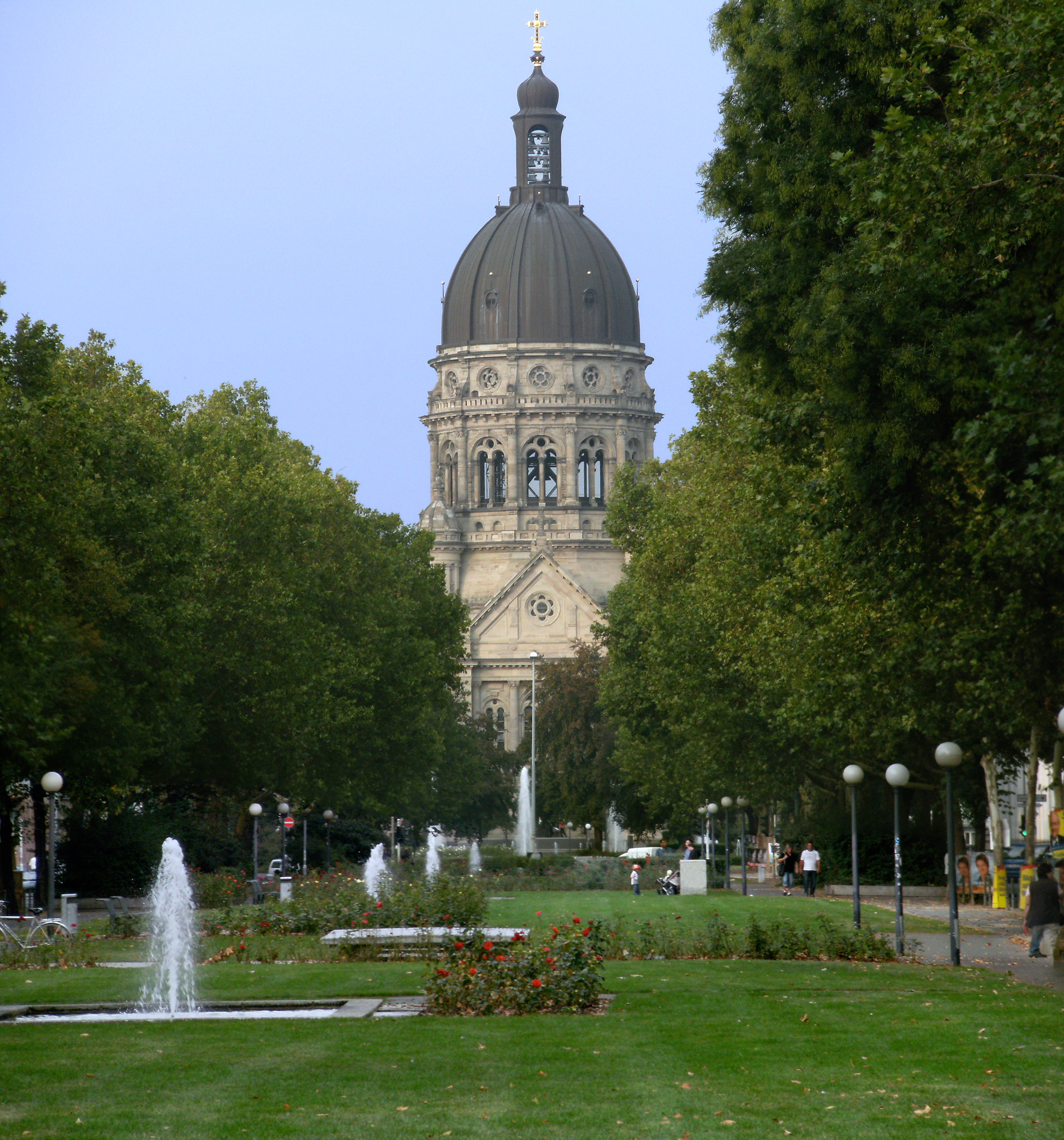
Kaiserstraße ("Emperor Street") with boulevard and Christuskirche

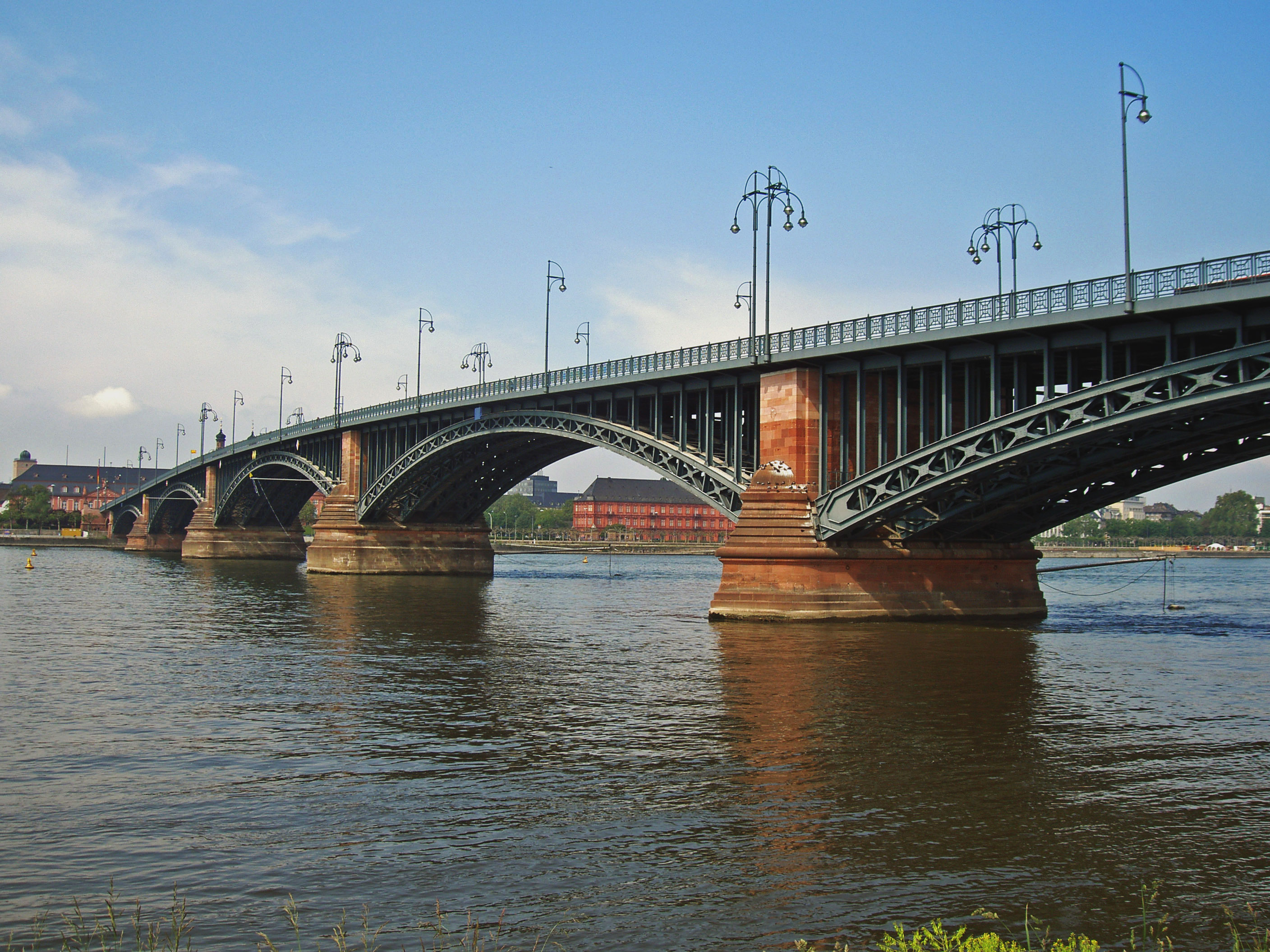
Theodor Heuss Bridge

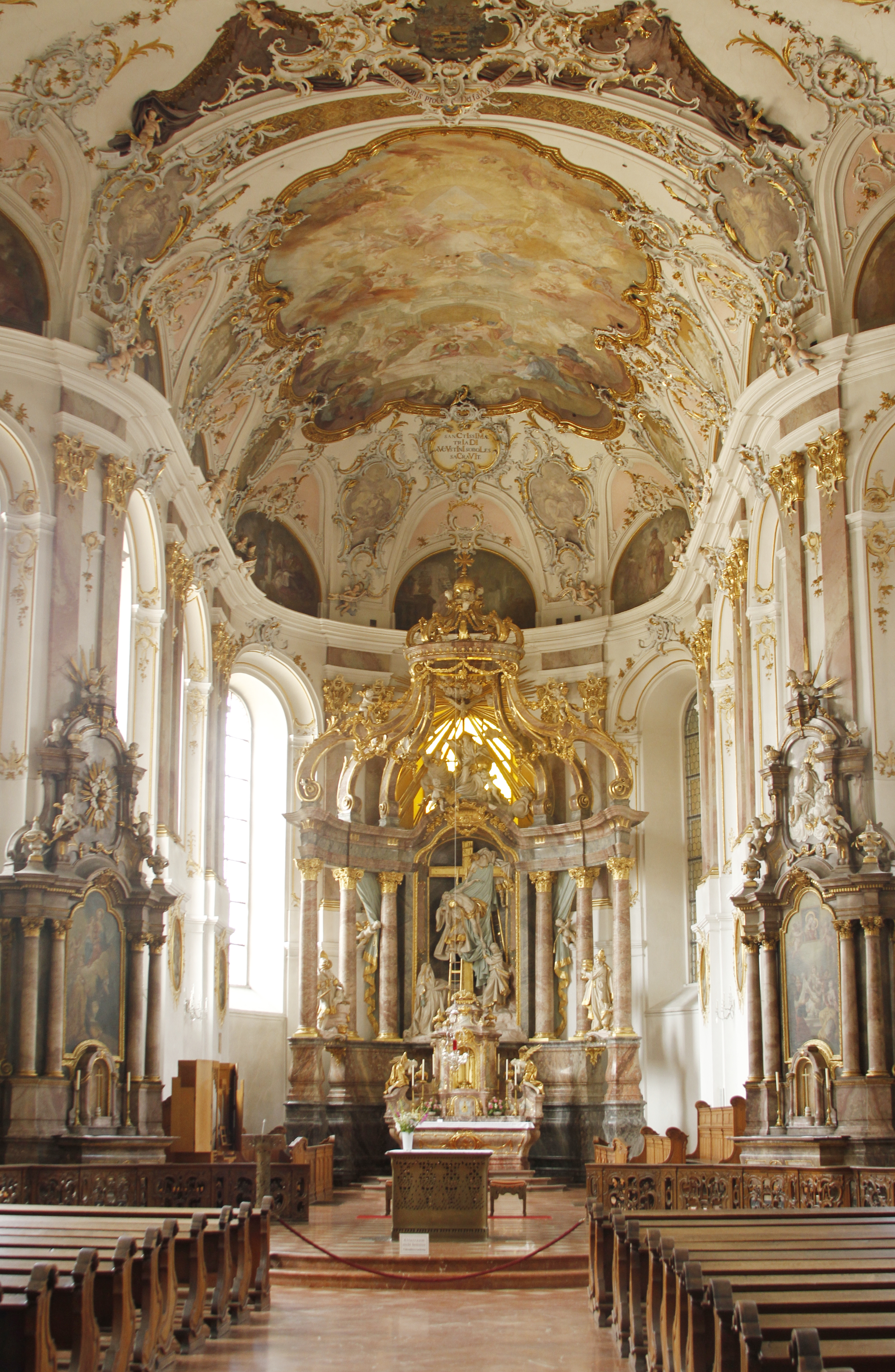
Interior of the Augustinian Church

- Romano-Germanic Central Museum (Römisch-Germanisches Zentralmuseum). It is home to Roman, Medieval, and earlier artefacts.
- Museum of Ancient Seafaring (Museum für Antike Schifffahrt). It houses the remains of five Roman boats from the late 4th century, discovered in the 1980s.
- Roman remains, including Jupiter's column, Drusus' mausoleum, the ruins of the theatre and the aqueduct.
- Mainz Cathedral of St. Martin (Mainzer Dom), over 1,000 years old.
- St. John's Church, 7th century church building
- Staatstheater Mainz
- The Iron Tower (Eisenturm, tower at the former iron market), a 13th-century gate-tower.
- The Wood Tower (Holzturm, tower at the former wood market), a 15th-century gate tower.
- The Gutenberg Museum – exhibits an original Gutenberg Bible amongst many other printed books from the 15th century and later.
- The Mainz Old Town – the half south of the cathedral survived World War II.
- The old arsenal, the central arsenal of the fortress Mainz during the 17th and 18th centuries
- The Electoral Palace (Kurfürstliches Schloss), residence of the prince-elector.
- The Marktbrunnen, one of the largest Renaissance fountains in Germany.
- Domus Universitatis (1615), a former Jesuit college building and for centuries the tallest edifice in Mainz.
- Christ Church (Christuskirche), built 1898–1903, bombed in 1945 and rebuilt in 1948–1954.
- The Church of St. Stephan, with post-war windows by Marc Chagall.
- Mainz Citadel
- The ruins of the church St. Christoph, a World War II memorial
- Schönborner Hof (1668).
- Rococo churches of St. Augustin (the Augustinerkirche, Mainz) and St. Peter (the Peterskirche, Mainz).
- Churches of St. Ignatius (1763) and St. Quintin.
- Erthaler Hof (1743)
- The Baroque Bassenheimer Hof (1750)
- The Botanischer Garten der Johannes Gutenberg-Universität Mainz, a botanical garden maintained by the university
- Landesmuseum Mainz, state museum with archaeology and art.
- Zweites Deutsches Fernsehen (ZDF) – one of the largest public German TV-broadcasters.
- New synagogue in Mainz
- Hauptfriedhof Mainz
- Old Jewish Cemetery Mainz (Judensand) – ShUM city of Mainz, UNESCO World Heritage Site
- Kunsthalle Mainz – museum for contemporary art
- Humbrechthof, later called Schöfferhof, the building in which Johannes Gutenberg developed his technique of printing

== Administration ==
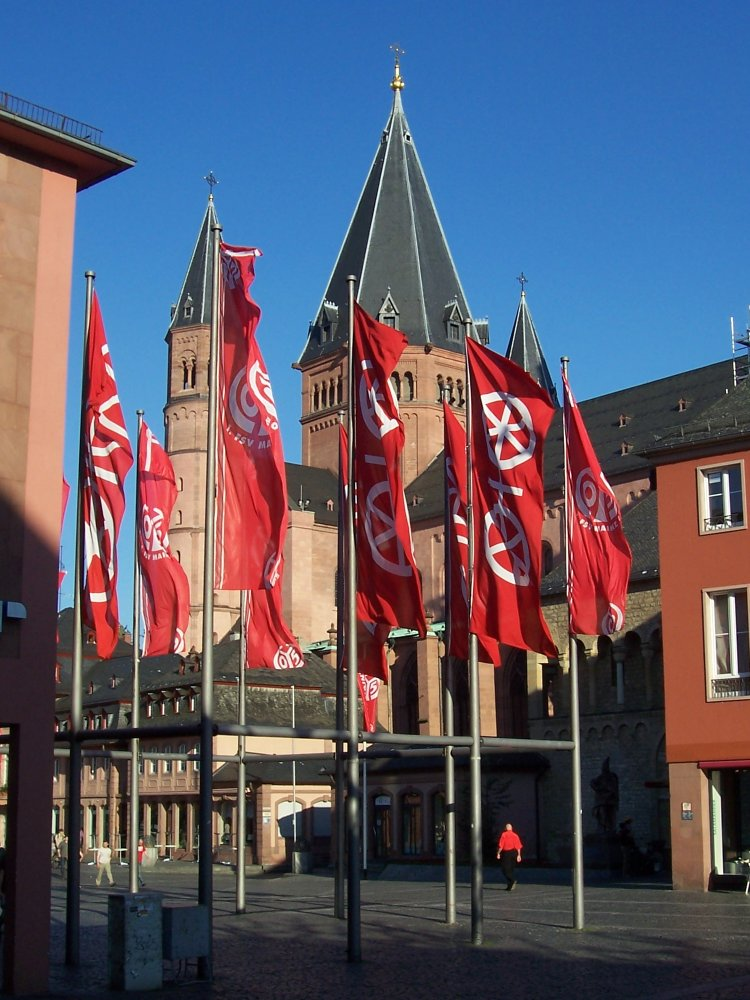
Mainz Rad and FSV Mainz 05 flags on the Domplatz

The city of Mainz is divided into 15 local districts according to the main statute of the city of Mainz. Each local district has a district administration of 13 members and a directly elected mayor, who is the chairman of the district administration. This local council decides on important issues affecting the local area; however, the final decision on new policies is made by Mainz's municipal council.

In accordance with section 29 paragraph 2 Local Government Act of Rhineland-Palatinate, which refers to municipalities of more than 150,000 inhabitants, the city council has 60 members.

Districts of the town are:

- Altstadt
- Bretzenheim
- Drais
- Ebersheim
- Finthen
- Gonsenheim
- Hartenberg-Münchfeld
- Hechtsheim
- Laubenheim
- Lerchenberg
- Marienborn
- Mombach
- Neustadt
- Oberstadt
- Weisenau

Until 1945, the districts of Bischofsheim (now an independent town), Ginsheim-Gustavsburg (which together are an independent town) belonged to Mainz. The former districts Amöneburg, Kastel, and Kostheim – (in short, AKK) are now administered by the city of Wiesbaden (on the north bank of the river). The AKK was separated from Mainz when the Rhine was designated the boundary between the French occupation zone (the later state of Rhineland-Palatinate) and the U.S. occupation zone (Hesse) in 1945.

=== Coat of arms ===
The coat of arms of Mainz is derived from the coat of arms of the Archbishops of Mainz and features two six-spoked silver wheels connected by a silver cross on a red background.

== Population ==
Historical population
| Year | Pop. | ±% |
|---|---|---|
| 50 | 16,000 | — |
| 750 | 5,000 | −68.8% |
| 1300 | 24,000 | +380.0% |
| 1545 | 10,000 | −58.3% |
| 1700 | 20,000 | +100.0% |
| 1816 | 25,251 | +26.3% |
| 1871 | 53,902 | +113.5% |
| 1900 | 84,251 | +56.3% |
| 1910 | 110,634 | +31.3% |
| 1925 | 108,552 | −1.9% |
| 1933 | 142,627 | +31.4% |
| 1939 | 158,333 | +11.0% |
| 1945 | 40,000 | −74.7% |
| 1951 | 96,005 | +140.0% |
| 1956 | 115,812 | +20.6% |
| 1961 | 135,192 | +16.7% |
| 1966 | 149,387 | +10.5% |
| 1971 | 178,639 | +19.6% |
| 1981 | 187,564 | +5.0% |
| 1991 | 182,867 | −2.5% |
| 2001 | 185,293 | +1.3% |
| 2006 | 196,425 | +6.0% |
| 2011 | 200,957 | +2.3% |
| 2016 | 213,528 | +6.3% |
| 2019 | 218,578 | +2.4% |
| 2023 | 223,318 | +2.2% |
Population size may be affected by changes in administrative divisions.

Mainz has a population of about 223,000 and is the largest city in Rhineland-Palatinate. Mainz passed 100,000 in 1908. In 1945, After WWII, right side of the Rhine river, which were a part of Mainz, became a part of Wiesbaden and other part of Hesse due to its occupation zone where Mainz and Rhineland-Palatinate were French occupation zone and Wiesbaden and Hesse were American occupation zone where both cities became its state capital in 1946. Mainz lost 21,1% of its population at this time. Mainz and Wiesbaden have rivalries who the better city on the Rhine river are even today. Mainz became an attractive city, especially for young people due to its radio and television broadcasters, universities, and good workplaces. Mainz's population grew normally and Mainz passed 200,000 in 2011.

=== Foreign populations ===
The following list shows the largest foreign populations in Mainz as of 2022:

| Rank | Nationality | Population (2022) |
|---|---|---|
| 1 | Turkey | 5,424 |
| 2 | Italy | 3,875 |
| 3 | Poland | 3,300 |
| 4 | Serbia | 2,739 |
| 5 | Ukraine | 2,587 |
| 6 | Bulgaria | 2,126 |
| 7 | Portugal | 1,920 |
| 8 | Russia | 1,790 |
| 9 | Syria | 1,612 |
| 10 | Morocco | 1,325 |
| 11 | Spain | 1,106 |
| 12 | France | 942 |

== Politics ==
=== Mayor ===
Results of the second round of the 2019 mayoral election

The mayor of Mainz was Michael Ebling of the Social Democratic Party (SPD) until he was promoted State Minister of the Interior in the government of Rhineland-Palatinate in October 2022. The new mayoral election was held on 12 February 2023, with a runoff after Mainz carnival. The final election took place on 5 March 2023. The newly elected mayor is Nino Haase, independent.

Election 2019 of the council:

| Candidate | Party | First round | | Second round | |
| Candidate | Party | Votes | % | Votes | % |
|---|---|---|---|---|---|
| Michael Ebling | Social Democratic Party | 30,278 | 41.0 | 35,752 | 55.2 |
| Nino Haase | Independent (CDU, ÖDP, FW) | 23,968 | 32.4 | 29,029 | 44.8 |
| Tabea Rößner | Alliance 90/The Greens | 16,621 | 22.5 | | |
| Martin Malcherek | The Left | 2,063 | 2.8 | | |
| Martin Ehrhardt | Die PARTEI | 999 | 1.4 | | |
| Valid votes | | 73,929 | 99.6 | 64,781 | 99.4 |
| Invalid votes | | 289 | 0.4 | 372 | 0.6 |
| Total | | 74,218 | 100.0 | 65,153 | 100.0 |
| Electorate/voter turnout | | 161,967 | 45.8 | 162,030 | 40.2 |
Source: City of Mainz (1st round, 2nd round)

=== City council ===
Results of the 2019 city council election

The Mainz city council governs the city alongside the Mayor. The most recent city council election was held on 26 May 2019, and the results were as follows:

| Party | Votes | % | +/- | Seats | +/- |
|---|---|---|---|---|---|
| Alliance 90/The Greens (Grüne) | 1,582,459 | 27.7 | ▲7.5 | 17 | ▲5 |
| Christian Democratic Union (CDU) | 1,339,561 | 23.5 | ▼6.9 | 14 | ▼4 |
| Social Democratic Party (SPD) | 1,151,572 | 20.2 | ▼7.2 | 12 | ▼5 |
| Free Democratic Party (FDP) | 340,501 | 6.0 | ▲0.9 | 4 | ▲1 |
| The Left (Die Linke) | 335,459 | 5.9 | ▲1.3 | 4 | ▲1 |
| Alternative for Germany (AfD) | 302,604 | 5.3 | ▲2.3 | 3 | ▲1 |
| Ecological Democratic Party (ÖDP) | 238,727 | 4.2 | ▲0.2 | 2 | ±0 |
| Die PARTEI | 127,581 | 2.2 | New | 1 | New |
| Free Voters (FW) | 108,701 | 1.9 | ▲0.9 | 1 | ±0 |
| Pirate Party (Piraten) | 78,595 | 1.4 | ▼0.4 | 1 | ±0 |
| Volt Germany (Volt) | 67,376 | 1.2 | New | 1 | New |
| Alliance for Innovation and Justice (BIG) | 31,419 | 0.6 | ▲0.1 | 0 | ±0 |
| Total votes | 5,704,555 | 100.0 | | | |
| Total ballots | 100,522 | 100.0 | | 60 | ±0 |
| Electorate/voter turnout | 162,321 | 61.9 | ▲11.0 | | |
Source: City of Mainz

== Culture ==
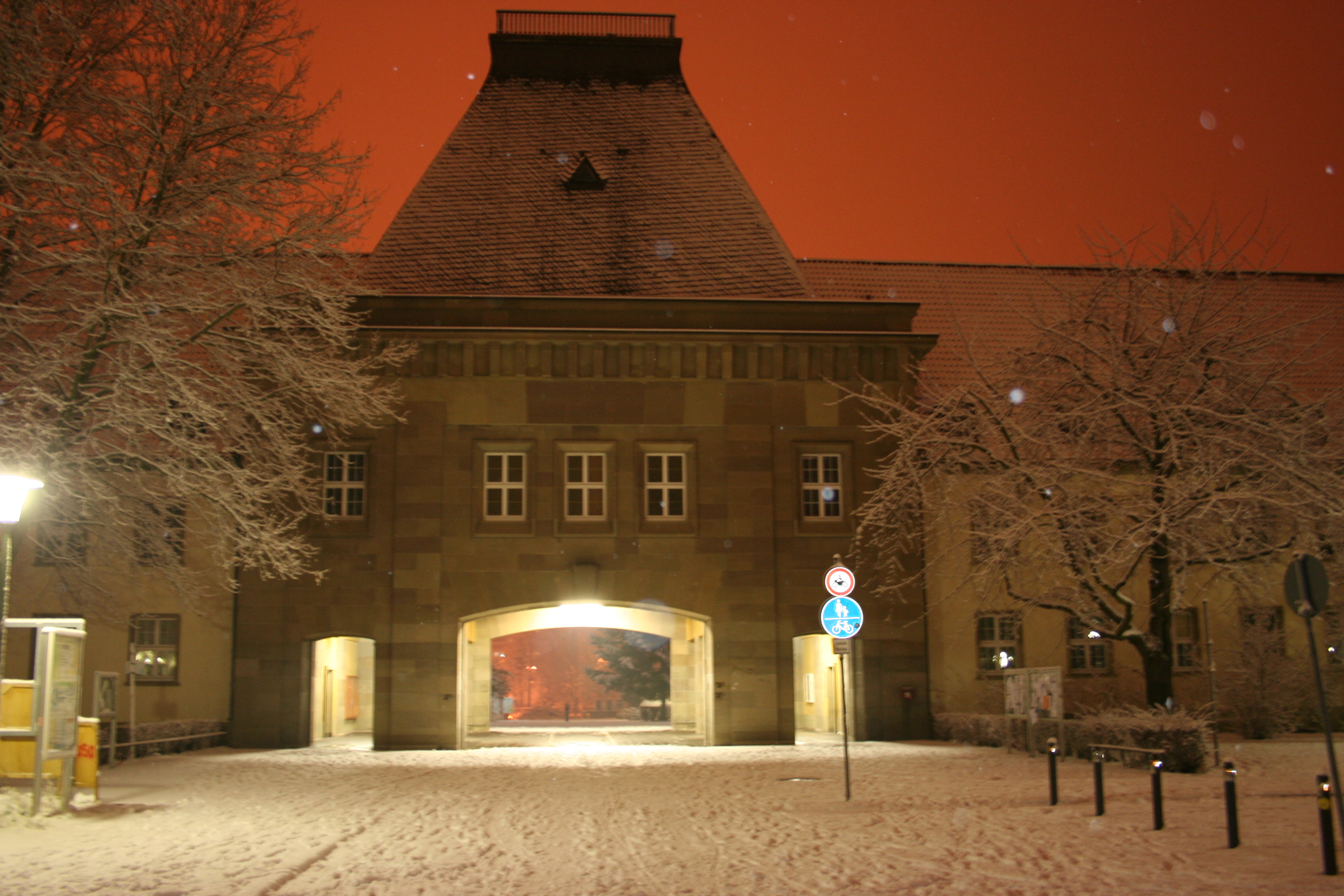
Forum of the Johannes Gutenberg University of Mainz

Mainz is home to a Carnival, the Mainzer Fassenacht or Fastnacht, which has developed since the early 19th century. Carnival in Mainz has its roots in the criticism of social and political injustices under the shelter of cap and bells. Today, the uniforms of many traditional Carnival clubs still imitate and caricature the uniforms of the French and Prussian troops of the past. The height of the carnival season is on Rosenmontag ("rose Monday"), when there is a large parade in Mainz, with more than 500,000 people celebrating in the streets.

The first-ever Katholikentag, a festival-like gathering of German Catholics, was held in Mainz in 1848.

Johannes Gutenberg, credited with the invention of the printing press, was born here and died here. Since 1968 the Mainzer Johannisnacht commemorates the person Johannes Gutenberg in his native city. The Mainz University, which was refounded in 1946, is named after Gutenberg; the earlier University of Mainz that dated back to 1477 had been closed down by Napoleon's troops in 1798.

Mainz was one of three important centres of Jewish theology and learning in Central Europe during the Middle Ages. Known collectively as Shum, the cities of Speyer, Worms and Mainz played a key role in the preservation and propagation of Talmudic scholarship.

The city is the seat of Zweites Deutsches Fernsehen (literally, "Second German Television", ZDF), one of two federal nationwide TV broadcasters. There are also a couple of radio stations based in Mainz. The Mainzer Stadtschreiber (City clerk in Mainz) is an annual German literature award.

Other cultural aspects of the city include:

- As a city in the Greater Region, Mainz participated in the program of the year of European Capital of Culture 2007.
- The Walk of Fame of Cabaret may be found nearby the Schillerplatz.
- The music publisher Schott Music is located in Mainz.
- One of the oldest brass instrument manufacturers in the world, Gebr. Alexander is located in Mainz.
- Fans of Gospel music enjoy the yearly performances of Colours of Gospel.
- Every one or two years, a festival for improvised music between jazz, avant-garde and rock with a line-up of internationally renowned musicians takes place, the Akut-Festival.
- Mainz is sometimes considered to be the birthplace of Spundekäs, a type of cheese that has remained popular in the region

== Education ==
- University of Mainz
- University of Applied Sciences Mainz
- Catholic University of Applied Sciences Mainz

== Sports ==
The local football club 1. FSV Mainz 05 has a long history in the German football leagues. Since 2004, it has competed in the Bundesliga (First German soccer league) except for a break in the second level in the 2007–2008 season. Mainz is closely associated with the renowned coach Jürgen Klopp, who spent the vast majority of his playing career at the club and was also the manager for seven years, leading the club to Bundesliga football for the first time. After leaving Mainz, Klopp went on to win two Bundesliga titles and reach a Champions League final with Borussia Dortmund. In the summer of 2011, the club opened its new stadium called Coface Arena, which was later renamed Opel Arena. Further relevant football clubs are TSV Schott Mainz, SV Gonsenheim, Fontana Finthen, FC Fortuna Mombach and FVgg Mombach 03.

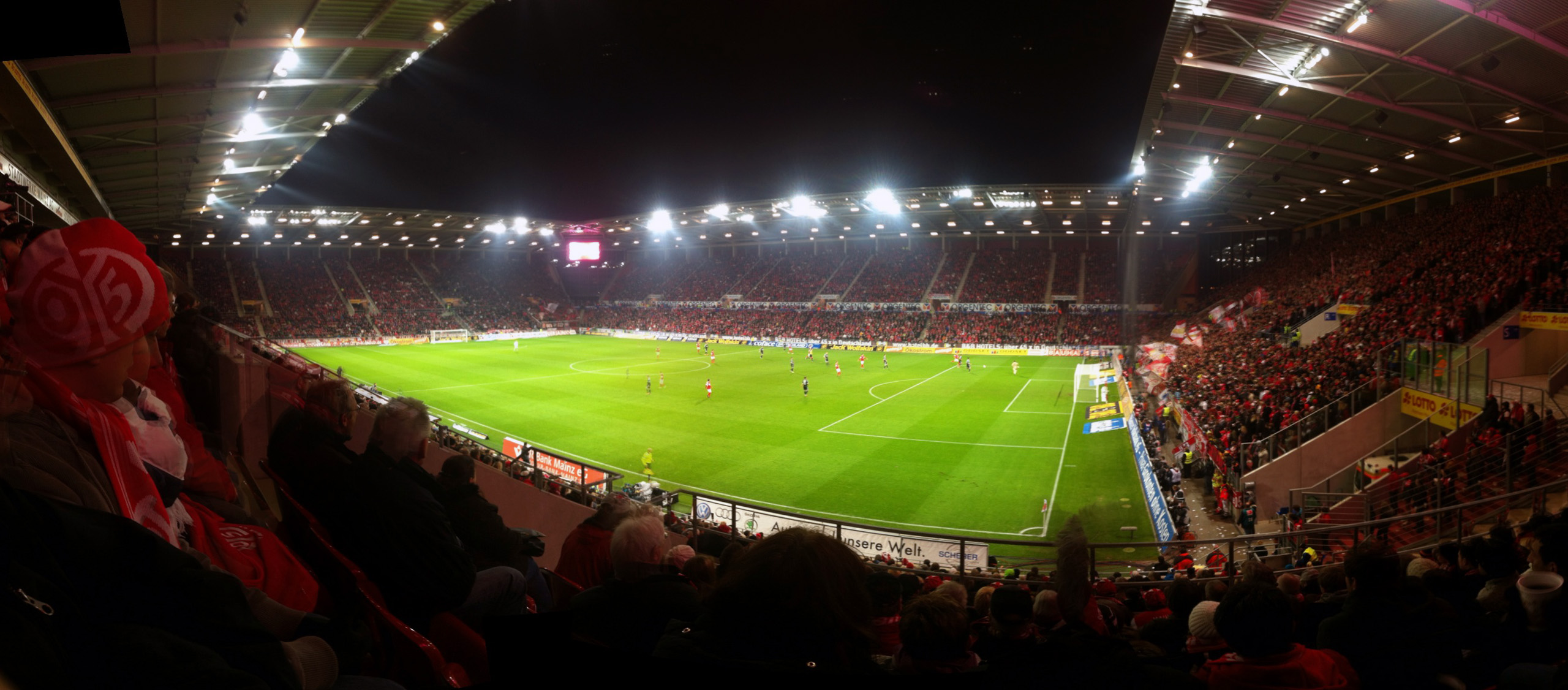
Mewa Arena

The local wrestling club ASV Mainz 1888 is currently in the top division of team wrestling in Germany, the Bundesliga. In 1973, 1977, 2012 and 2023, the ASV Mainz 1888 won the German championship.

In 2007 the Mainz Athletics won the German Men's Championship in baseball.

As a result of the 2008 invasion of Georgia by Russian troops, Mainz acted as a neutral venue for the Georgian Vs Republic of Ireland football game.

The biggest basketball club in the city is the ASC Theresianum Mainz. Its men's team is playing in the Regionalliga and its women's team is playing in the 2.DBBL.

=== USC Mainz ===
Universitäts-Sportclub Mainz (University Sports Club Mainz) is a German sports club based in Mainz (Germany). It was founded on 9 September 1959 by Berno Wischmann primarily for students of the University of Mainz. It is considered one of the most powerful Athletics Sports clubs in Germany. 50 athletes of USC have distinguished themselves in a half-century in club history at the Olympic Games, World and European Championships. In particular, in the decathlon dominated USC athletes for decades: Already at the European Championships in Budapest in 1966, Mainz won three (Werner von Moltke, Jörg Mattheis and Horst Beyer) all decathlon medals. In the all-time list of USC, there are nine athletes who have achieved more than 8,000 points – at the head of Siegfried Wentz (8762 points in 1983) and Guido Kratschmer (1980 world record with 8667 points). The most successful athlete of the association is more fighter, sprinter and long jumper, Ingrid Becker (Olympic champion in 1968 in the pentathlon and Olympic champion in 1972 in the 4 × 100 metres relay and European champion in 1971 in the long jump). The most famous athletes of the present are the sprinter Marion Wagner (world champion in 2001 in the 4 × 100 metres relay) and the pole vaulters Carolin Hingst (Eighth of the 2008 Olympics in Beijing) and Anna Battke.

Three world titles adorn the balance of USC Mainz. For the discus thrower, Lars Riedel attended (1991 and 1993) and the already mentioned sprinter Marion Wagner (2001). Added to 5 titles at the European Championships, a total of 65 international medals and 260 victories at the German Athletics Championships.

The players of USC's basketball section played from the season 1968/69 to the season 1974/1975 in the National Basketball League (BBL) of the German Basketball Federation (DBB). As a finalist to winning the DBB Cup in 1971 USC Mainz played in the 1971–72 FIBA European Cup Winners' Cup against the Italian Cup winners of Fides Napoli.

=== Mainz Athletics ===
The Baseball and Softball Club Mainz Athletics is a German baseball and softball club located in the city of Mainz in Rhineland-Palatinate. The Athletics is one of the largest clubs in the Baseball-Bundesliga Süd in terms of membership, claiming to have hundreds of active players. The club has played in the Baseball-Bundesliga for more than two decades and has won the German Championship in 2007 and 2016.

== Economy ==
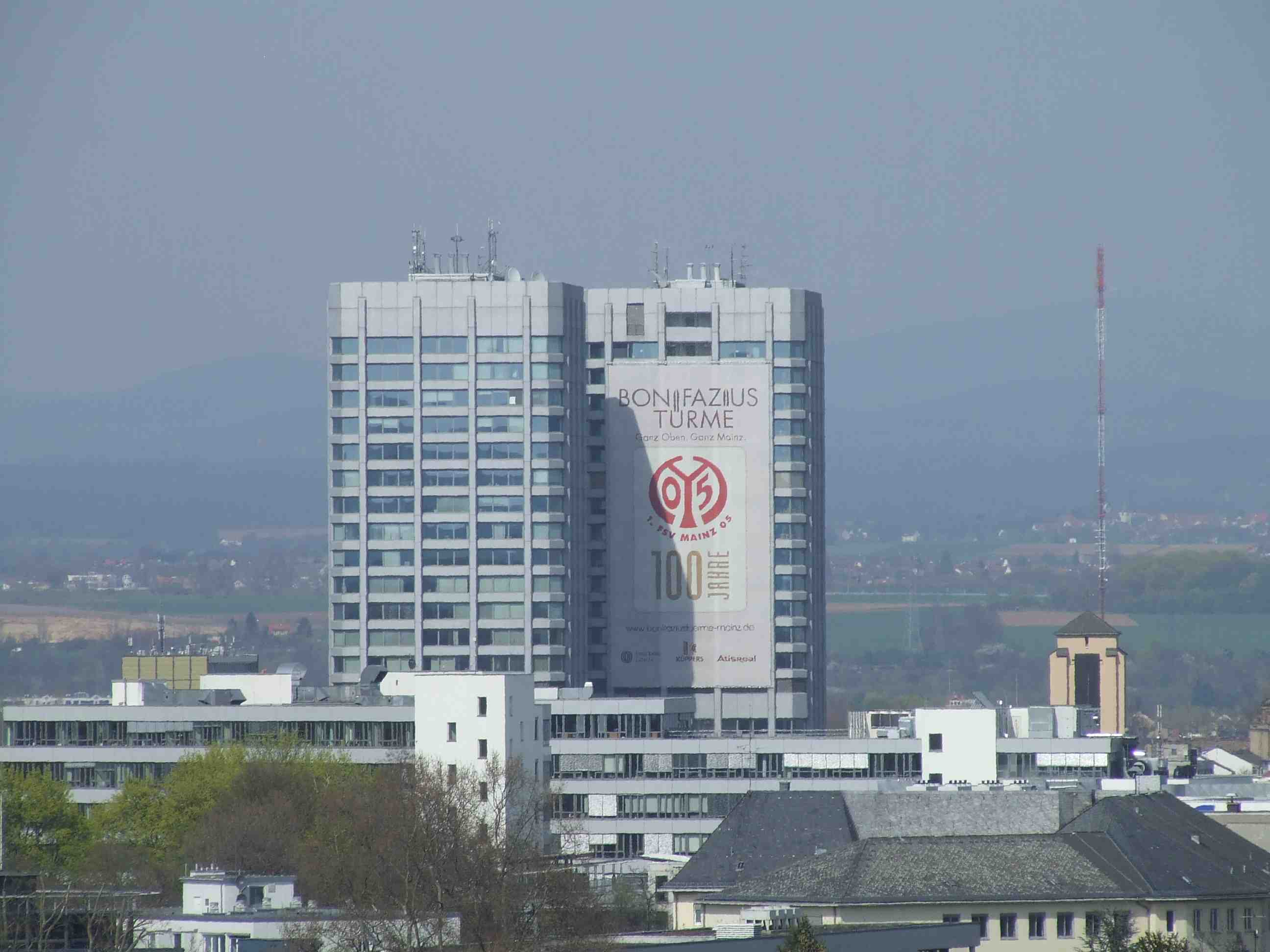
Bonifatius center building

Mainz is one of the top three "European Rising Innovative Cities 2022" and was awarded second place in the "European Rising Innovative City 2022" category. In the Future Map 2025, published by Handelsblatt, the city of Mainz was ranked seventh out of 400 German districts and independent cities, making it one of the places with 'high future opportunities'.

=== Wine centre ===
Mainz is documented to be a wine-growing region since bishop Boniface acquired a vineyard bordering the city wall and further vine plantations in Bretzenheim in 752 and is one of the centres of the German wine industry. Since 2008, the city is a member of the Great Wine Capitals Global Network (GWC), an association of well-known wine culture cities of the world. Many wine traders work in the city. The sparkling wine producer Kupferberg, produced in Mainz-Hechtsheim and Henkell – now located on the other side of the river Rhine – were once founded in Mainz. The famous Blue Nun, one of the first branded wines, was marketed by the Sichel family. The Haus des Deutschen Weines (House of German Wine) is located in the city. The Mainzer Weinmarkt (wine market) is one of the great wine fairs in Germany.

=== Other industries ===
The Schott AG, one of the world's largest glass manufacturers, as well as the Werner & Mertz, a large chemical factory, are based in Mainz. Other companies such as IBM, QUINN Plastics, or Novo have their German administration in Mainz as well. BioNTech, a biotechnology company developing immunotherapies including a vaccine against coronavirus disease 2019 (COVID-19) was founded in 2008 in Mainz by scientists Uğur Şahin, and Özlem Türeci, with the Austrian oncologist Christoph Huber.

Johann-Joseph Krug, founder of France's famous Krug champagne house in 1843, was born in Mainz in 1800.

=== Media ===
Some of the Germany's television broadcasters including ZDF (Zweites Deutsches Fernsehen, lit. "Second German Television"), the second-most important German public service television broadcaster, and 3sat, another television broadcaster that is jointly operated by public broadcasters from Germany (ARD and ZDF), Austria (ORF), and Switzerland (SRG SSR), are both based in the city. Regional television is provided by SWR which also has a broadcast centre and studios in the city.

Local radio in Mainz is provided by SWR1 Rheinland-Pfalz, RPR1 and Antenne Mainz,

Mainz's local newspaper is served by Allgemeine Zeitung which publishes daily on print and online.

== Transport ==
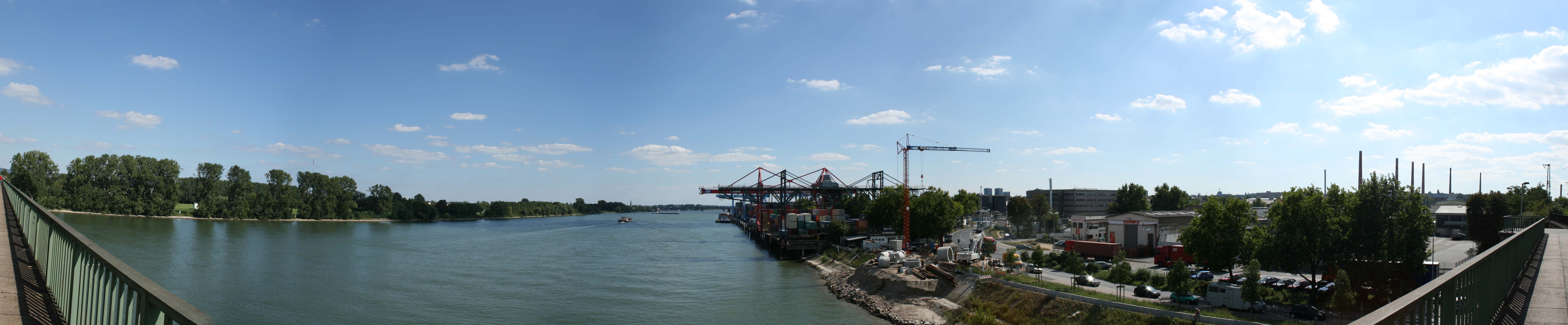
View to the Rheinreede, container cranes 2007, laid down in 2010

Mainz is a major transport hub in southern Germany. It is an important component in European distribution, as it has the fifth-largest intermodal port in Germany. The Port of Mainz, now handling mainly containers, is a sizable industrial area to the north of the city, along the banks of the Rhine. In order to open up space along the city's riverfront for residential development, it was shifted further northwards in 2010.

=== Rail ===
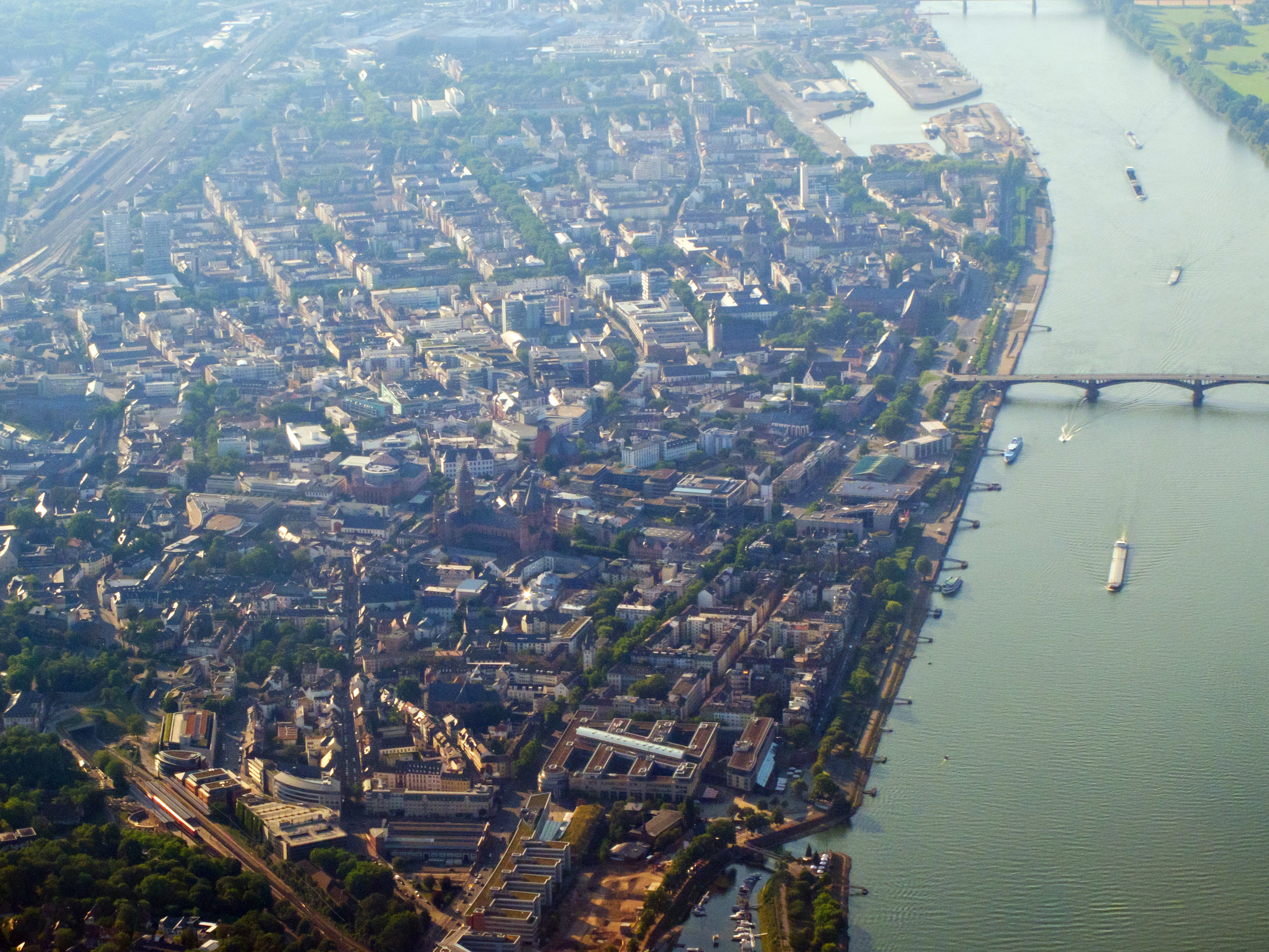
Aerial photograph of Mainz

Mainz Central Station or Mainz Hauptbahnhof, is frequented by 80,000 travelers and visitors each day and is therefore one of the busiest 21 stations in Germany. It is a stop for the S-Bahn line S8 of the Rhein-Main-Verkehrsverbund. Additionally, the Mainbahn line to Frankfurt Hbf starts at the station. It is served by 440 daily local and regional trains (StadtExpress, RE and RB) and 78 long-distance trains (IC, EC and ICE). Intercity-Express lines connect Mainz with Frankfurt (Main), Karlsruhe Hbf, Worms Hauptbahnhof and Koblenz Hauptbahnhof. It is a terminus of the West Rhine Railway and the Mainz–Ludwigshafen railway, as well as the Alzey–Mainz railway, erected by the Hessische Ludwigsbahn in 1871. Access to the East Rhine Railway is provided by the Kaiserbrücke, a railway bridge across the Rhine at the north end of Mainz.

=== Public transportation ===
Rhein-Main-Verkehrsverbund (RMV)

The Mainz Central Station is an interchange point for the Mainz tramway network, and an important bus junction for the city and region (Rhein-Nahe-Nahverkehrsverbund (RNN), Omnibusverkehr Rhein-Nahe (ORN) and Mainzer Verkehrsgesellschaft (MVG)).

In Mainz the fare of the Rhein-Main-Verkehrsverbund (RMV) as well as the Rhein-Nahe-Nahverkehrsverbund (RNN) apply.

=== Cycling ===
Mainz offers a wide array of bicycle transportation facilities and events, including several miles of on-street bike lanes. The Rheinradweg (Rhine Cycle Route) is an international cycle route, running from the source to the mouth of the Rhine, traversing four countries at a distance of 1,300 km (810 mi). Another cycling tour runs towards Bingen and further to the Middle Rhine, a UNESCO World Heritage Site (2002).

=== Air transportation ===
Mainz is served by Frankfurt Airport, the busiest airport by passenger traffic in Germany by far, the third busiest in Europe and the ninth busiest worldwide in 2009. Located about 10 miles (16 kilometres) east of Mainz, it is connected to the city by an S-Bahn line.

The small Mainz Finthen Airport, located just 3 miles (5 km) southwest of Mainz, is used by general aviation only. Another airport, Frankfurt-Hahn Airport located about 50 miles (80 km) west of Mainz, is served by a few low-cost carriers.

== Notable people ==
- List of people from Mainz
- Archbishops of Mainz
- List of mayors of Mainz

== Twin towns – sister cities ==
Mainz is twinned with:

- Watford, United Kingdom (1956)
- Dijon, France (1957)
- Zagreb, Croatia (1967)
- Valencia, Spain (1978)
- Haifa, Israel (1981)
- Erfurt, Germany (1988)
- Louisville, United States (1994)
- Odesa, Ukraine (2024)
- Longchamp, France (1966, with Mainz-Laubenheim)
- Rodeneck, Italy (1977, with Mainz-Finthen)

Mainz has friendly relations with:

- Kigali, Rwanda (1982)
- Baku, Azerbaijan (1984)

== See also ==
- Johann Fust
- Johannes Gutenberg
- Peter Schöffer, apprentice of Gutenberg and early printer
