= Akut-Festival =

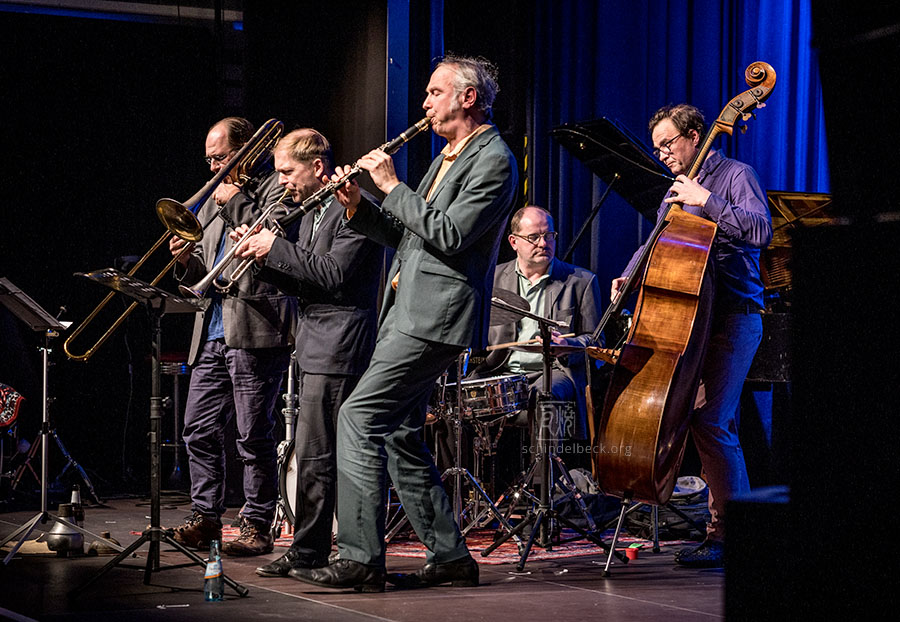
"Die Enttäuschung" at Akut-Festival 2018

The Akut-Festival is a jazz festival that was established in 1987 in Mainz, Germany and is held every one or two years. The festival, organized by non-profit upArt e.V., takes place on one or two consecutive days in November at the venue "Frankfurter Hof" and is highly acclaimed by national media. The focus is on the more free varieties of jazz and the exploration of improvised music between jazz, avant-garde and rock. Among the musicians who have been presented in this series in the past are: Peter Brötzmann, Aki Takase, Alexander von Schlippenbach, Eve Risser, Bobby Previte, Elliott Sharp, Christian Lillinger, Fred Frith, Günter Sommer, Ken Vandermark, The Sun Ra Arkestra, Maggie Nicols, Phil Minton, Ray Anderson, Rudi Mahall, Tim Berne.
