= Marcelle Lafont =

French chemist, resistance fighter, politician (1905–1982)

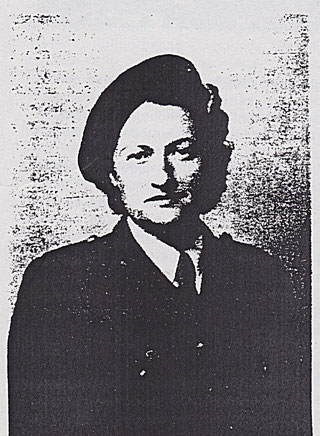
- Born: 23 November 1905; Lyon
- Died: 8 October 1982 (aged 76); Songieu
- Occupations: Chemist, chemical engineer, French Resistance member, politician.
- Partner: André Clayeux
- Parents: Adolphe Lafont (father); Pauline Lafont (mother)

Marcelle Lafont (23 November 1905 - 8 October 1982) was a chemist, chemical engineer, member of the French Resistance and later a politician. Born into the successful bourgeois Lafont family (owners of the Adolphe Lafont company) she broke with tradition and earned a degree in chemical engineering, became a truck driver, an aviator and spoke several languages. In 1935 she ran for election in Villeurbanne when women still did not have the right to vote in France. During the Second World War, her work in the French Resistance earned her the Resistance Medal. She later took up politics in Songieu.

== Early life and education ==
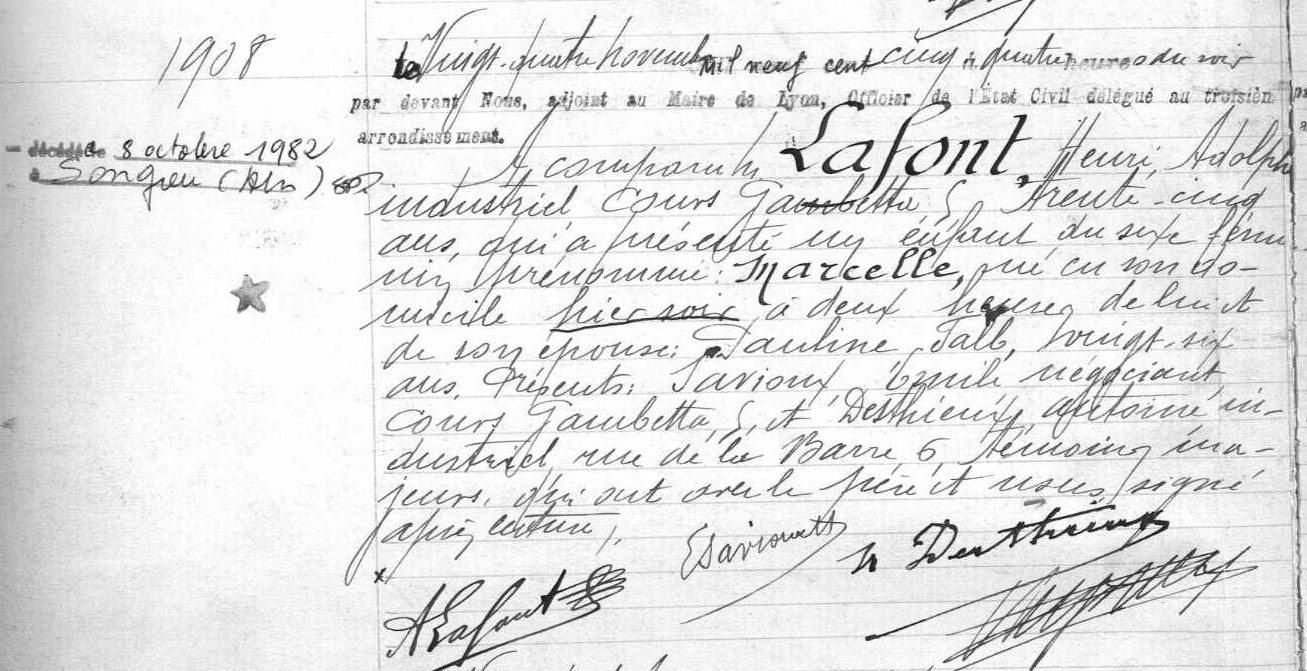
Birth record of Marcelle LAFONT

Marcelle Lafont was born in the 3rd arrondissement of Lyon on 23 November 1905, the only daughter of Pauline (née Falb) and Adolphe Lafont. Her father was an industrialist and founder of the company Adolphe Lafont, the first inventors of salopettes. Her mother used the family fortune and connections in her philanthropic work. The young Marcelle often accompanied her father to the factory, and learned how the industrial and technical world worked in the workshops.

As an only child, Marcelle Lafont was brought up to be her father's successor, encouraged to pursue a rigorous education, not usual at the time for a young girl who was part of the Lyonnaise bourgeoisie. Her mother Pauline Lafont was well educated, having graduated from the lycée Edgar Quinet, and was involved in running the family business. From 1921 - 1925, Madame Lafont oversaw the development of the now listed Art Deco family home, Villa Lafont aka Villa La Ferrandière, near the family factory. She commissioned interiors inspired by those discovered at Pompei, seen on a family visit there. The house was designed by the Bureau Technique de Construction led by engineers Léon Lelièvre (1878-1938) and Léon Barbier (1849-1930) and incorporated cutting-edge technologies in a house. It was connected to the factory by an electrical circuit, a water supply and an underground passage.

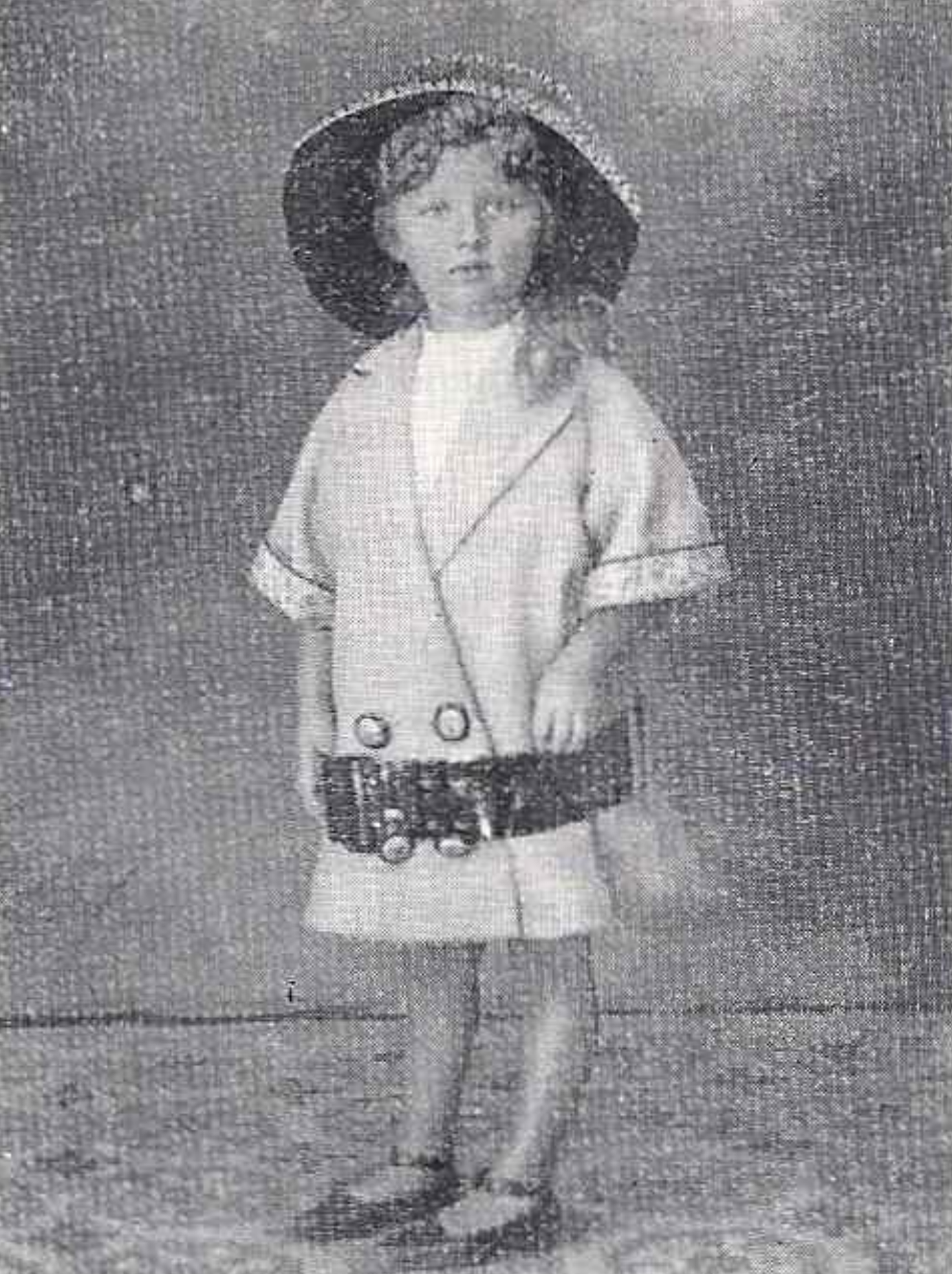
Marcelle Lafont as a child.

Marcelle Lafont passed her Baccalauréat in elementary mathematics and earning a licence ès sciences, a higher level secondary education qualification. She then passed the entrance examination to the engineering college l'école de chimie de Lyon and graduated as a chemical engineer in 1930.

Her maternal grandparents were German-speaking Swiss, so she grew up fluent in the language, which proved useful later in life. She was also fluent in English and Malagasy.

In the 1930s, she obtained her HGV license and in 1937, she was certified as a pilot and flew as a member of the Lyon flying club.

== Career ==
As a qualified chemical engineer, Marcelle would have been able to start her career in the family business, but wanted to prove herself independently, and found employment at the Bertholus airography factory in Caluire.

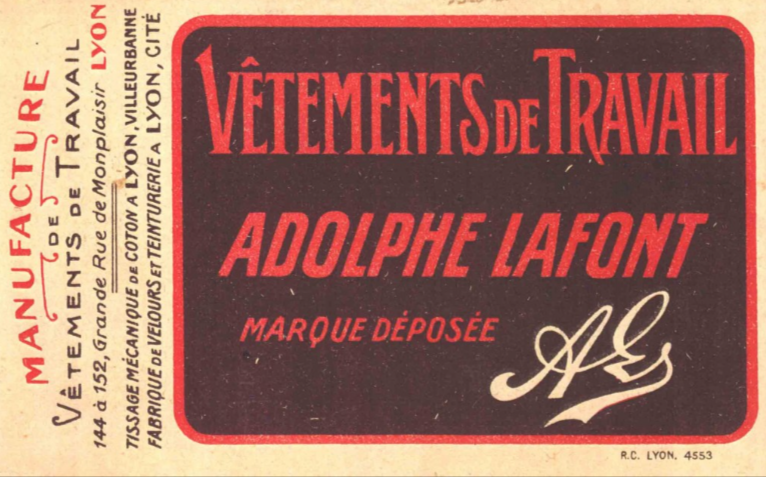
The Adolphe Lafont company sold work clothes

After this, she returned to the Lafont family company, working in the dyeing workshop. In 1937 when the company became a Société Anonyme, a public limited liability company, her father appointed her to the board of directors and described her as "mon fils” (my son).

In 1935, her uncle Ernest Lafont became Minister of Health and Sports, and asked her to take care of child welfare in his cabinet. She was in charge of crèches, orphanages, and the monitoring of young offenders and sick children. When his ministerial position came to an end in 1936, she remained with him as his assistant while he was a député.

In 1947, after the Second World War, she returned to a position in the family company until her father's death in 1952. She then resigned from the board of directors and she and her mother divided the shares held by Adolphe Lafont between them and the Lafont factory employees' association. They retired to the family property at Songieu in the Ain region.

== Social work ==
Marcelle Lafont inherited her Protestant mother's commitment to social action. She worked to improve conditions for factory workers and was active in organisations with educational or medical aims at a national level, including the Ligue d'Études et de Réformes de l'Enfance délinquante (League for the Study and Reform of Delinquent Children) and Guérir et Revivre (Healing and Living). These associations had been set up by the Reformed Church of France.

In 1934, together with her mother, she hosted the women's programme L'heure de la femme on the Lyon radio station La-Doua, opened by her uncle Ernest Lafont.

== 1935 political candidacy in Villeurbanne ==
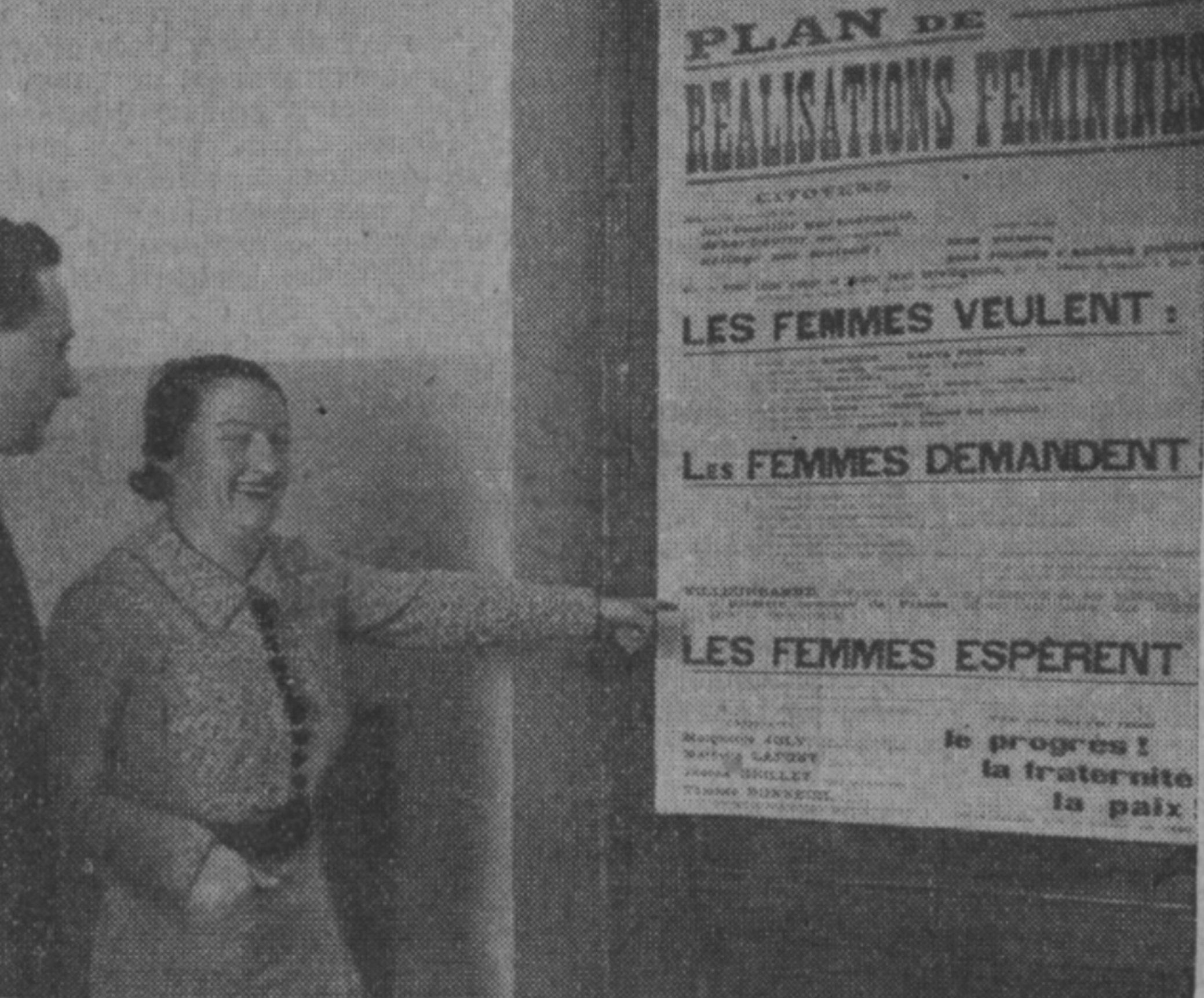
Marcelle Lafont on her electoral campaign in Villeurbanne en 1935.

In 1935, at the request of Lazare Goujon, mayor of Villeurbanne, Lafont ran as a conseillère municipale privée (private municipal councillor) in Villeurbanne, an election organised in parallel with the official elections for the town hall. Women would not have the right to vote in France until 1944, so this function of private municipal councillor was experimental. They were elected by the electorate, could take part in the work of the commissions, be given projects, and attend the public meetings of the town council, but their voice was only consultative and they could not take part in the discussions. Lazare Goujon's idea was to change the law on women's suffrage by proving that they were capable of taking on political responsibilities.

In an interview with Paris-Soir, Marcelle Lafont presented her manifesto: Le respect des consciences, le respect de la mère et de l'enfant, l'enseignement ménager obligatoire, l'espéranto dans les programmes scolaires et le développement de la pratique des sports. (Respect for consciences, respect for mothers and children, compulsory domestic education, esperanto in the school curriculum and the development of sports". She also explained: "We are women of no party, we are women".

The list presented by Marcelle Lafont's Union française pour le suffrage des femmes was defeated by the communist list, and came second out of three. These experimental women's lists received interest from over 50% of voters.

== Second World War - resistance work ==
In 1939, Lafont asked to join the air force as a pilot but was refused. She was assigned to Home Front duties, specifically defence against aerial attacks and was deputy to the departmental director of the Rhône. Her role included organising flying teams for detecting poison gas.

On 19 June 1939, on the cusp of the invasion of Lyon, she transported armed soldiers out of the city in her truck to prevent them from being taken prisoner. She also hid some troops in her Home Front defence post. She managed to infiltrate the Casernes de la Part-Dieu barracks in Lyon, which had been requisitioned by the Germans as a prison camp, to provide the men with food and medicine.

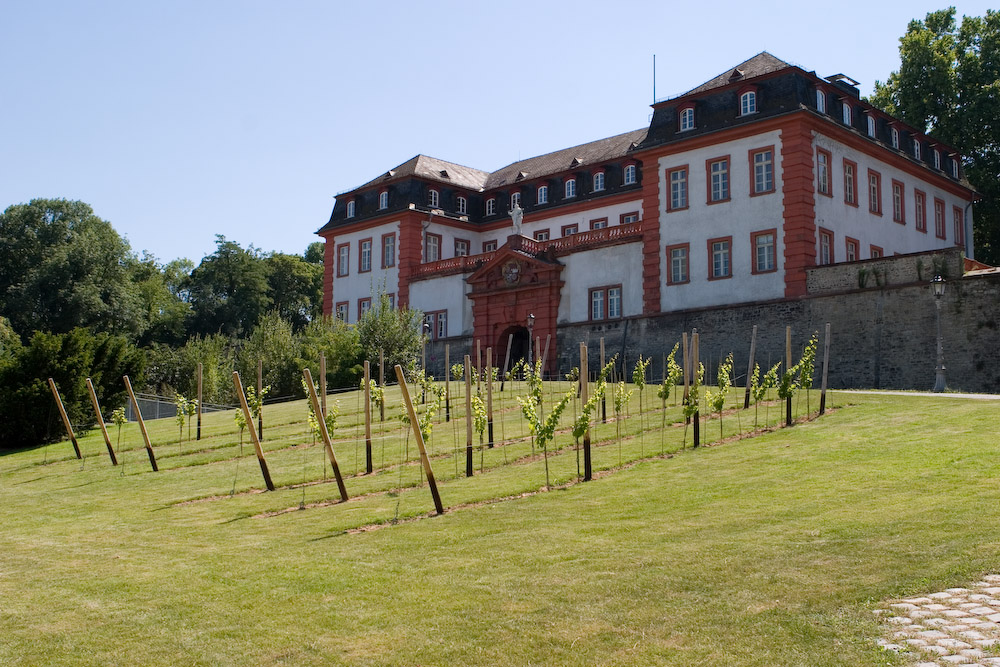
Oflag XII-B was located in the Mainz Citadel.

After to fall of France, Lafont looked after refugees and people expelled from Alsace and Lorraine. In November 1940, she joined the women's section of the Amitiés africaines drivers and supplied the prison camps and hospitals. She repatriated about 300 sick and wounded people from metropolitan France and the French colonies in her lorry.

She twice travelled to Germany without official papers to bring food and clothing to the kommandos (forced labour workers) in the Stuttgart region and to the Oflag XII-B prisoner of war camp in Mainz.

While delivering supplies to the Charleville stalag, on 25 October 1941, she helped the non-commissioned officer Antoine Blanquez escape by hiding him in her truck to take him to Paris. She later repeated this operation and helped another prisoner escape under similar circumstances.

In 1942, as she was no longer allowed to go to Germany, she stayed in the zone libre (free zone) to look after soldiers from the colonies. She became the director of a home in Fréjus which looked after these units. She also asked the Ministry of the Colonies to create a corps d'assistantes coloniales and became its director from December 1942 until the end of 1947. The service was then dissolved because all the men were repatriated.

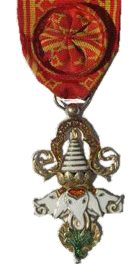
Insignia of an d’officier de l’ordre du Million d’Éléphants.

From 23 August 1944 to the liberation of Lyon on 2 September 1944, the corps d'assistantes coloniales provided supplies to army units from the French colonies: around 500 men stationed in Villeurbanne, Décines, Saint-Fons and Vaulx-en-Velin. Later, they did the same in the towns of Péage-de-Rousillon and Saint-Rambert-d'Albon .

She was promoted to the rank of captain on 28 September 1945 by the Minister for the Colonies.

She received letters of thanks and recognition from the soldiers until her death in 1982 and she recognised with official commendations by these soldiers' home countries.

== Medals and commendations ==
Marcelle Lafont received several medals and orders of commendation in recognition of her actions and bravery. She was awarded the Médaille de la Résistance In March 1947, and later was made a Chevalier de l'Ordre impérial du Dragon d'Annam, an Officier de l'Ordre indochinois du Million d'éléphants et du Parasol blanc, was awarded the Médaille de la Santé publique and the Mérite agricole.

== Personal life ==
In 1935 Lafont met André Clayeux at the Ministry of Health and Sport. He became her life partner, although they did not marry. He was a sports champion, a triple jumper, seconded from his infantry regiment, and was responsible for organising French participation in the 1936 Berlin Olympics. Marcelle Lafont was appointed to represent the Minister at the 1936 Winter Olympics and left for Garmisch-Partenkirchen in February 1936. Together they broadcast the opening ski jumping event.

Clayeux was Commander of the French 62nd Tank Battalion during the Second World War and taken prisoner on 25 June 1940. He was detained at Oflag XII-B, a German prisoner of war camp for officers in Mainz Citadel. Lafont discovered his presence there in 1942 as part of her work for the French Red Cross.

After the war Clayeux became Director of Sports at the Ministry of National Education and created l’Institut National des Sports.

The couple retired together to Songieu where Clayeux died on 30 January 1971.

Lafont was actively involved in village life of Songieu. She was deputy mayor from March 1959 to March 1966 and mayor from March 1966 to March 1973. With André Clayeux, she founded the Cercle Amical de Songieu. After his death, she tried her hand at raising dairy cows and pheasants, as her father had wished when he bought the property. The inhabitants nicknamed her "La demoiselle de Songieu".
