= Roman Theatre (Mainz) =

Ancient Roman theater in Mainz, Germany

Coordinates: 49°59′35″N 8°16′41″E

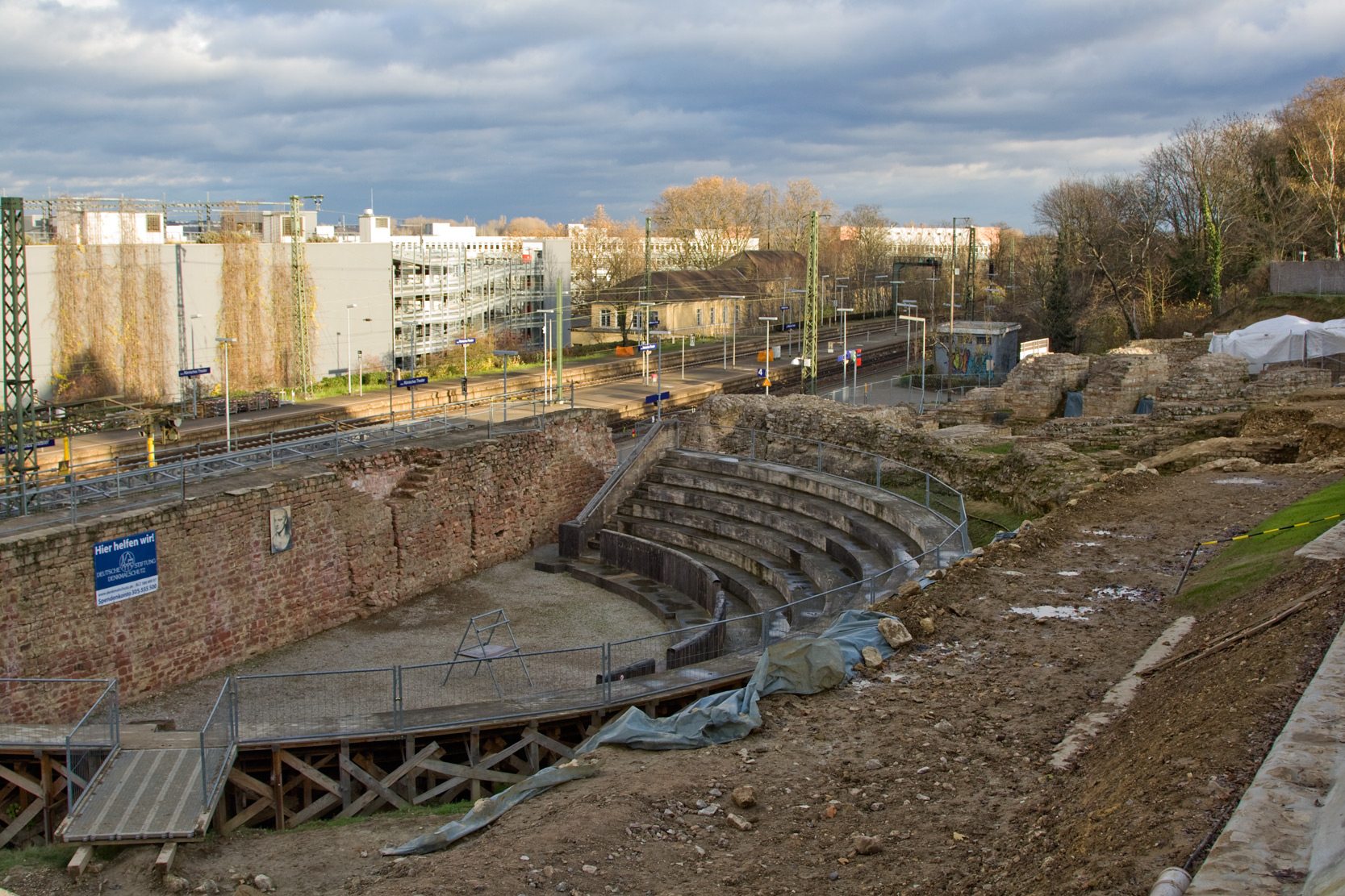
Roman theatre of Mogontiacum (Mainz)

The Roman Theatre in Mainz, Rhineland Palatinate (ancient Mogontiacum) was excavated in the late 1990s. It is located immediately next to the Mainz Römisches Theater station and was once the largest Roman theatre north of the Alps, with a diameter of 116 metres, a stage-width of 42 metres, and a capacity of roughly ten thousand people.

== History ==
Mogontiacum owed its significance to its location at the meeting point of the Main and the Rhine. The city provided a convenient base for the defense of the nearby border of the Roman Empire, the limes, and for the organisation of military campaigns against the Germani. As a result, a double legionary camp was built on the site in 13/12 BC, which remained in place until some time after AD 350.

Over time a civilian settlement (Latin vicus) also developed on the site, which became the provincial capital of the newly created province of Germania Superior around AD 80. In this city, a Roman theatre was built, which was probably closely associated with the funerary games held in honour of Drusus. From 9 BC, military parades (decursio militum) were held in honour of Drusus at his cenotaph, the Drususstein, which was only 340 metres away from the theatre. Accordingly, the Roman theatre may have been used for the thanksgiving ceremony (supplicatio) by the representations of the sixty local Gallic communities (Galliarum civitates) in honour of Drusus. Suetonius mentions a theatre at Mogontiacum in his account of events in AD 39. Probably the currently visible stone structure was preceded by an earlier structure in wood.

The theatre was the largest Roman theatre north of the Alps, seating some 10,000 visitors. The diameter of the seating area is 116 metres and the diameter of the orchestra in 42 metres. After the construction of the city wall in the middle of the fourth century AD, for which stone from the theatre was used, the theatre was left outside the walled area and fell into ruin. More and more of the stone from the theatre was taken away for reuse in new construction projects.

The massive vaults of the theatre survived for a few centuries. From the 6th century they were used as catacombs for burials of the surrounding monasteries, especially St Nikomedes (which itself no longer exists). Graves associated with this period have been found in the recent excavations.

The theatre is mentioned for a final time in the 11th century. Gozwin writes in his "Passio sancti Albani Martyris Moguntini" "The remaining ruins of the theatre there, which was built in the Roman manner for circus games and theatrical spectacles, provided this too."

During the construction of the Mainz Citadel in the middle of the 17th century, the area was completely levelled. The final visible remains of the masonry disappeared and the theatre was forgotten.

== Rediscovery and excavation ==
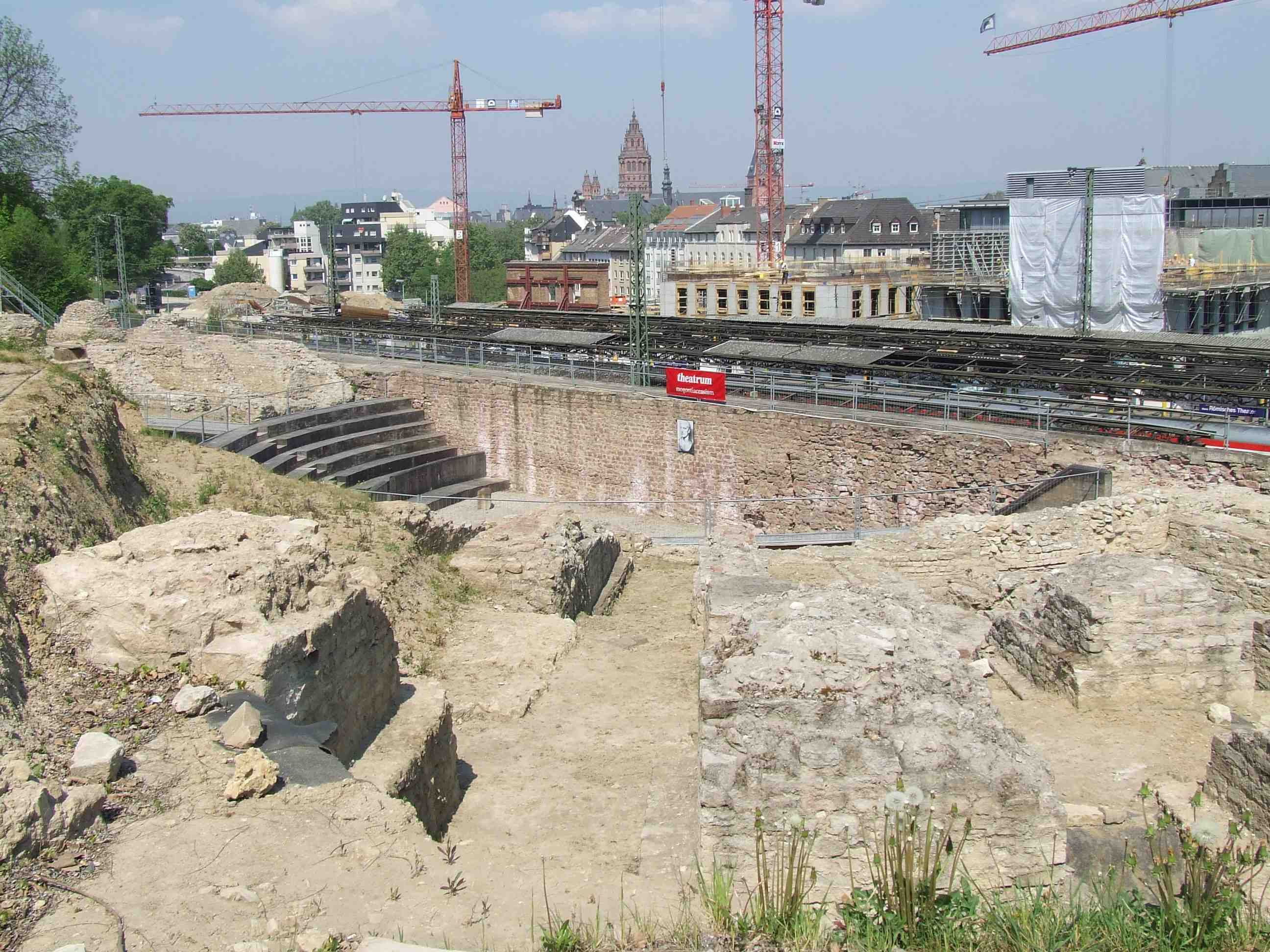
State of excavation at the end of April 2007; new railway station building in the background.

Foundations of the stage building were found in 1884 during the construction of the railway and were recorded before being demolished to make way for the tracks and platforms of the South Station (now the Mainz Römisches Theater station). The finds were not connected with the long lost theatre. In 1914, when further remains were discovered during the construction of a canal, the art historian Ernst Neeb identified the remains as part of a Roman theatre building. An exploratory excavation in 1916 supported his case, but because of the First World War, no further excavations could be undertaken. The remains were covered over once more and were completely forgotten.

In 1998, after several years of planning, several pillars were uncovered as part of a first test trench. From 1999, general excavations of the structure were undertaken, funded by sponsorship and donations and the assistance of local volunteers.

The theatre and its environs, including the neighbouring trains station and citadel, are to be further renovated in the near future. Musical and theatrical performances will be held in the theatre. There are also plans to extend the excavation area to the citadel and to reconstruct part of the theatre.

== Amphitheatre ==
Mogontiacum very likely also had an amphitheatre. For a long time this could not be specifically located, but historical records and excavations suggest it was located in Zahlbach, near the Dahlheim cloister (itself no longer extant). In the notes of the Mainz monk Siegehard c. 1100 AD, there is mention of the ruins of a theatre in Zahlbach, which was said to have been used for gladiatorial fights and circus races. In the Alten Geschichte von Mainz' by Father Joseph Fuchs, the amphitheatre is placed on another site, betweenthe modern Innenstadt and Hechtsheim. There would have been a large semicircle in which remains of solid pillars should have been found. So far, however, archaeological evidence for either site is lacking. The existence of an amphitheatre is only asserted indirectly, through signs like the dedication of gladiators.

== See also ==
- List of Roman theatres

== Bibliography ==
- Günter Walz: Die Geschichte des Theaters in Mainz. Ein Rückblick auf 2000 Jahre Bühnengeschehen Verlag Philipp von Zabern, Mainz 2004, ISBN 978-3-8053-3333-7
- Armin & Renate Schmid: Die Römer an Rhein und Main. Societäts-Verlag, Frankfurt 2006, ISBN 3-7973-0985-6
