= Pauline Lafont (philanthropist) =

French philanthropist

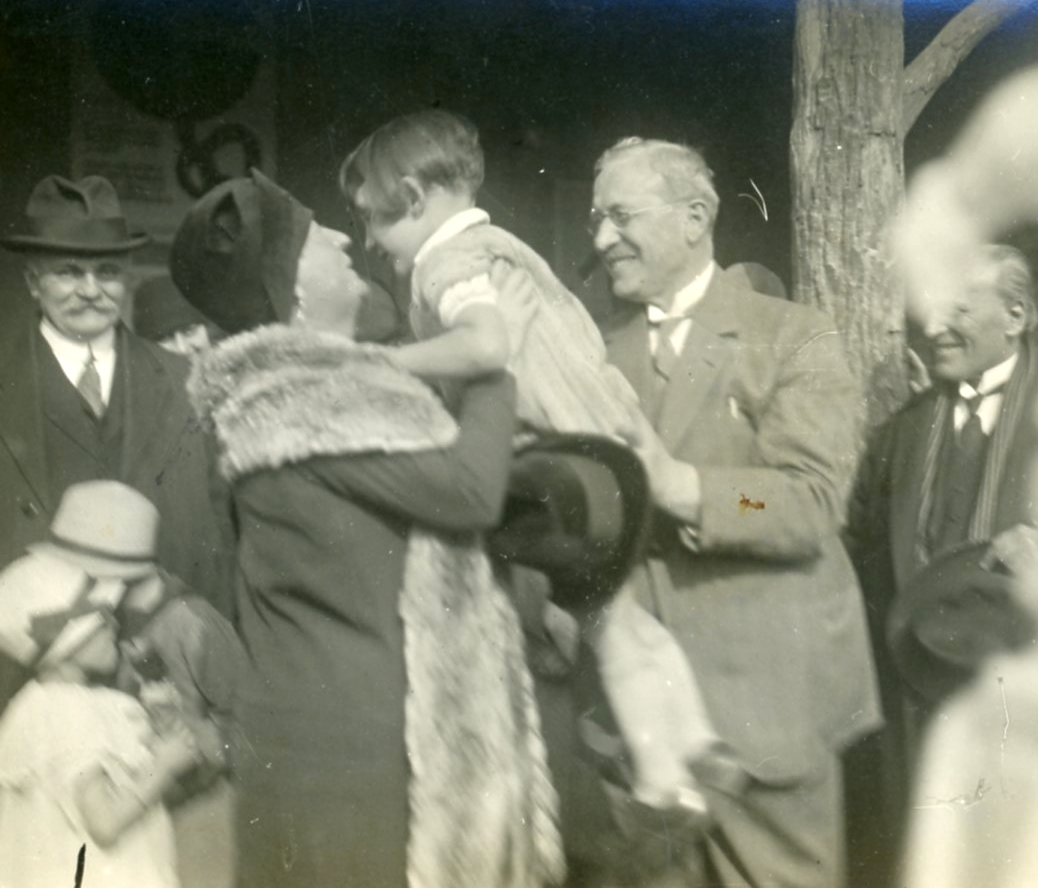
- Born: Pauline Falb; May 7, 1879; 3rd arrondissement of Lyon
- Died: February 22, 1955 (aged 75); Songieu
- Education: Lycée Édouard-Herriot
- Occupations: Benefactress, philanthropist
- Children: Marcelle Lafont

Pauline Lafont (née Falb) (7 May 1879 - 22 February 1955) was a French philanthropist. She ran the family business alongside her husband Adolphe Lafont, and was actively involved in social and cultural causes. She donated the land and rose garden surrounding her villa, which she had designed herself, to the city of Villeurbanne. These became the Jardin des Tout-petits-Adolphe-Lafont and the Square de la Roseraie.

== Early life and marriage ==
Pauline Falb was born on 7 May 1879 in the 3rd arrondissement of Lyon, the daughter of Jacques Adolphe Falb, a schoolteacher, and Charlotte Gurtrium, a merchant. (Note: Acte de naissance de Pauline Falb (Pauline Falb's birth certificate), Registre des naissances du 3e arrondisement de la ville de Lyon en 1879, acte No. 714, p. 102/302, (read online).)

Her Protestant father came from German-speaking Switzerland, and her mother Charlotte from Prussia. They were naturalized in 1891. Pauline Falb was educated at the Lycée de Jeunes Filles. From an early age, she and her parents got into the habit of helping others. They welcomed young Swiss girls who came to work in Lyon, and her father was very active in the Protestant community. (Note: Bazin, M.-J. «La famille Adolphe Lafont (partie 1/2)» (in French), No. 97 June 1986, pp. –15-17, (read online))

The day before her 17th birthday, on May 5, 1896, Pauline married Adolphe Lafont, nine years her senior. (Note: Acte de mariage d'Henri Adolphe Lafont et de Pauline Falb (Marriage certificate of Henri Adolphe Lafont and Pauline Falb), Registre des mariages du 3e arrondisement de la ville de Lyon en 1896, acte No. 332, p. 180/548, (read online)) Their parents were neighbors in Lyon's Cours Gambetta and friends, having known each other since Pauline's birth.

Pauline and her husband stayed in Lyon's 3rd arrondissement. Their marriage produced a daughter, Marcelle, on November 23, 1905. (Note: Acte de naissance de Marcelle Lafont (Registre des naissances du 3e arrondisement de la ville de Lyon au second semestre de l'année 1905, acte No. 1908, p. 135/172, (read online))

They left Lyon to move into their new villa in Villeurbanne, in the La Ferrandière district.

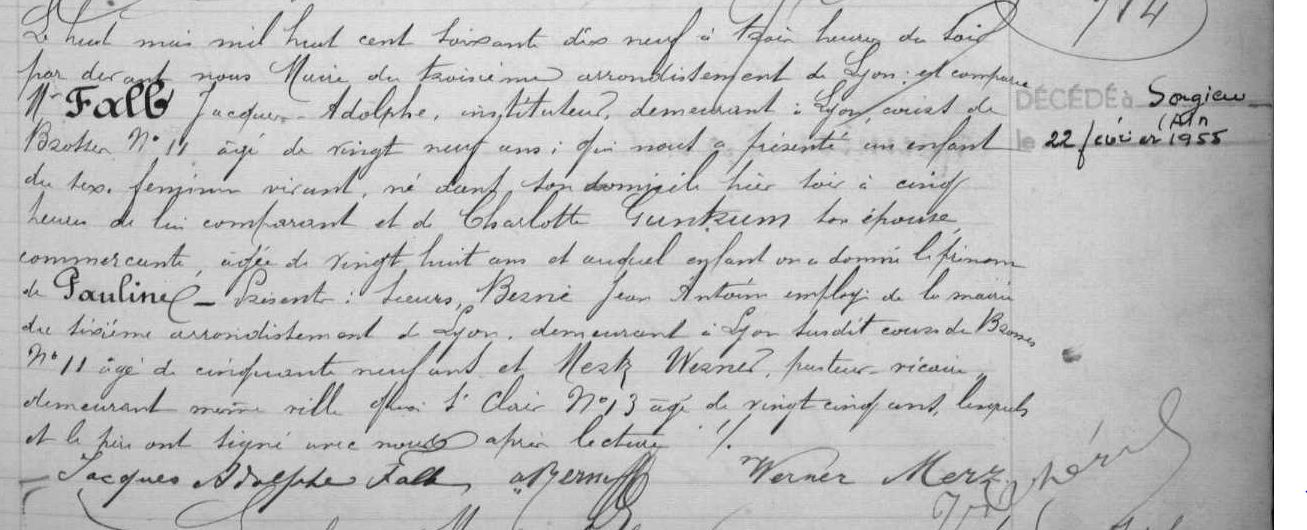
1879.05.07 - Pauline Falb birth certificate.

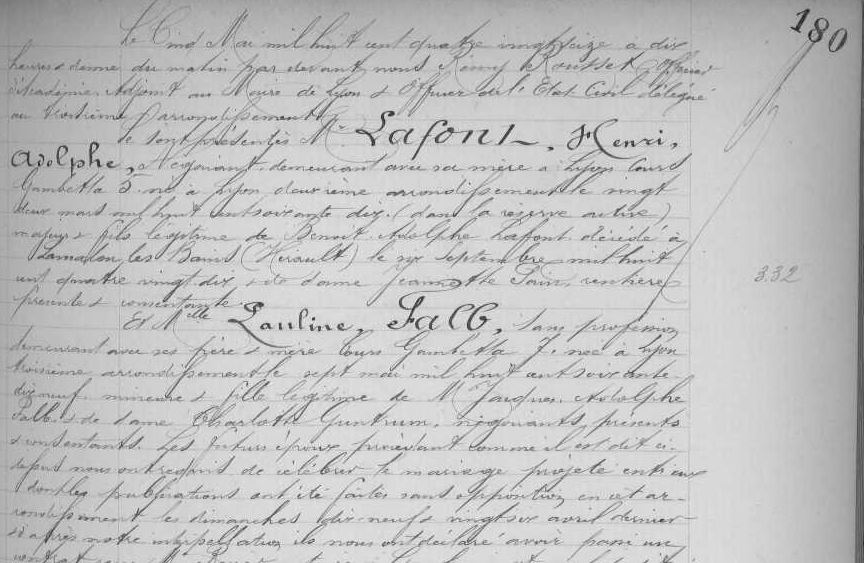
1896.05.05 - Marriage certificate for Henri Adolphe Lafont and Pauline Falb.

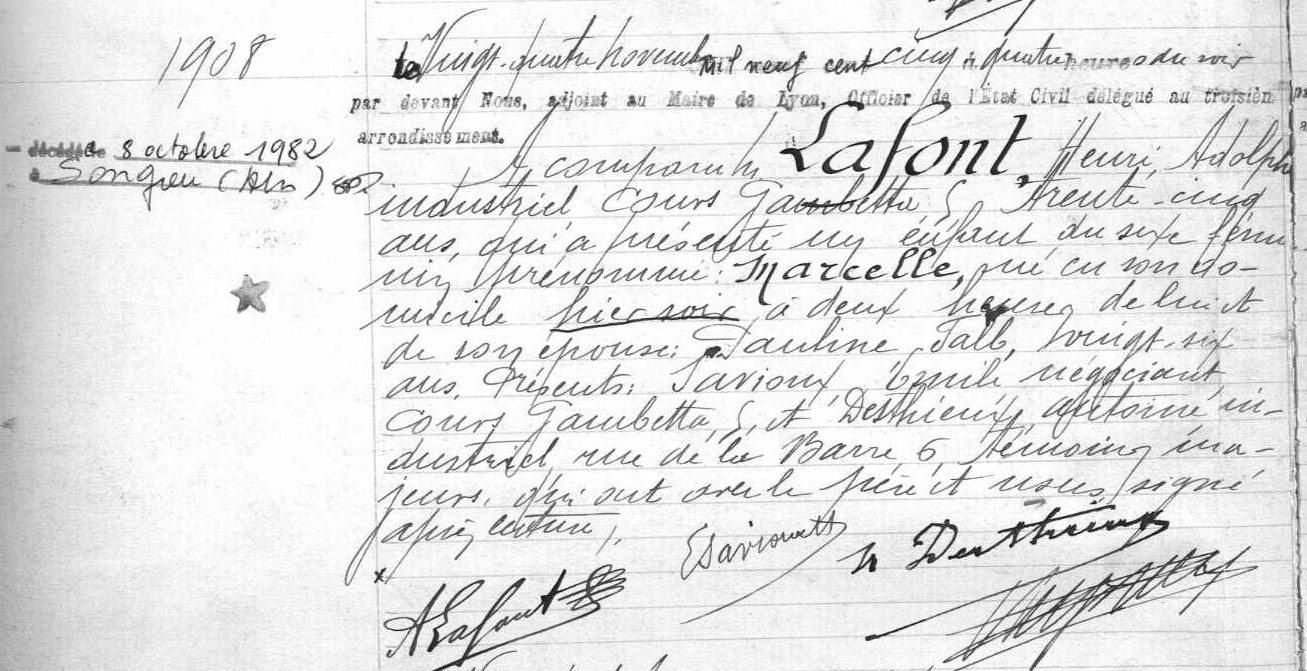
1905.11.23 - Birth certificate for Marcelle Lafont.

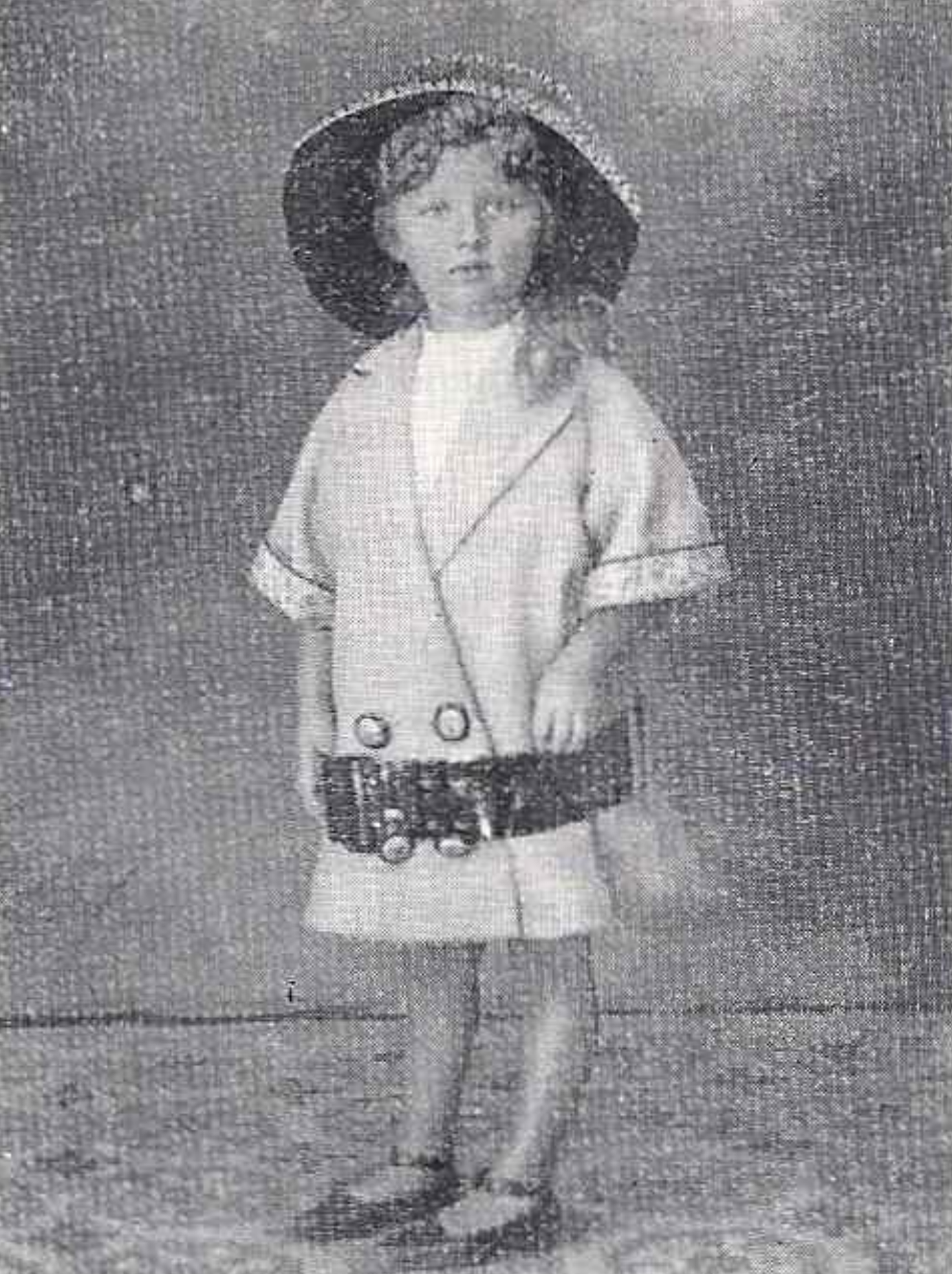
Marcelle Lafont as a young child in 1910

== Career in the Adolphe Lafont company ==
From the moment she married, Pauline was very active in the Lafont company. At first, she was the cashier at the store on rue de La Guillotière, and from 1906 onwards, although she didn't have the official title, she quickly became financial director. She was heavily involved in seeking financing and proposing subscriptions to increase share capital. She was also involved in clothing production, proposing new models and cuts and monitoring manufacturing costs. (Note: Navrot, Jacques, «La saga des Lafont» (in French), No. 164 March 2002, p. 20-24, (read online).)

When Adolphe Lafont died in 1952, Pauline and Marcelle divided his shares between themselves and the Lafont factory employees' association. They retired to the family property at Songieu in the Ain region, where Pauline died three years later. Marcelle took over the property, became mayor of Songieu, and died on October 8, 1982. (Note: Bazin, M.-J., «La famille Adolphe Lafont (partie 2/2)», No. 98 September 1986, pp. –9-10, (read online))

== Design of the Villa Lafont ==
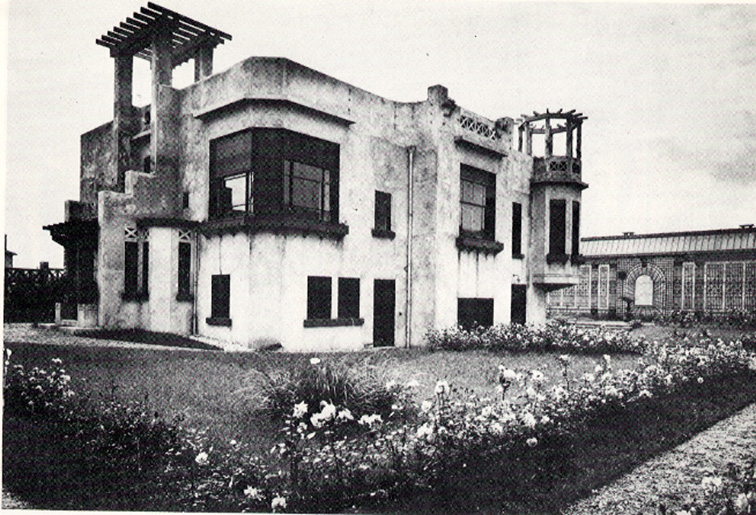
Villa Lafont just after construction

In 1919, when her husband had bought land to build his new factory in Villeurbanne, and as it was customary at the time to live next door to his factory, Pauline Lafont guided and influenced the designers in the technical construction office responsible for drawing up the plans and designs that were finalized in 1921. The "Villa Lafont", also known as the "Villa Ferrandière" at 40, rue du Quatre-Septembre and 22, avenue Marc-Sangnier, was completed in 1925. It was listed as a historic monument in 1991.

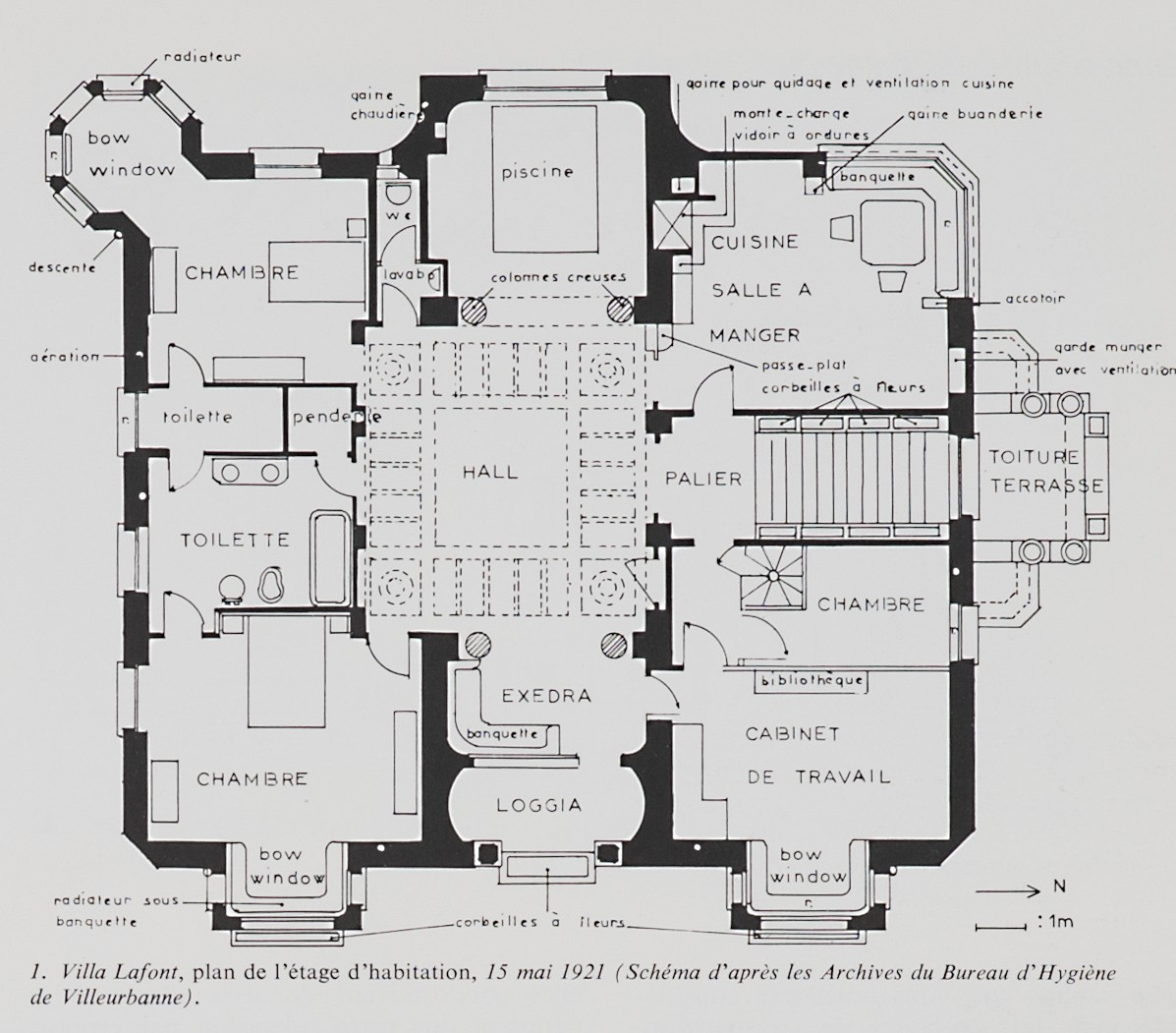
Schematic plan of the villa Lafont drawn up by A.-S. Clemençon from the 1921 plans

Its design was thoroughly modern, as Pauline Lafont didn't see it as a social symbol, but rather as a work tool. As a result, everything was accessible from a central hall, which altered the usual distribution of rooms. It incorporated all the modern comforts of the time: freight elevator, pass-through, garde manger and garbage chute in the kitchen; automated watering system on the roof terrace garden; fold-away bed and coat rack in the servants' apartment.

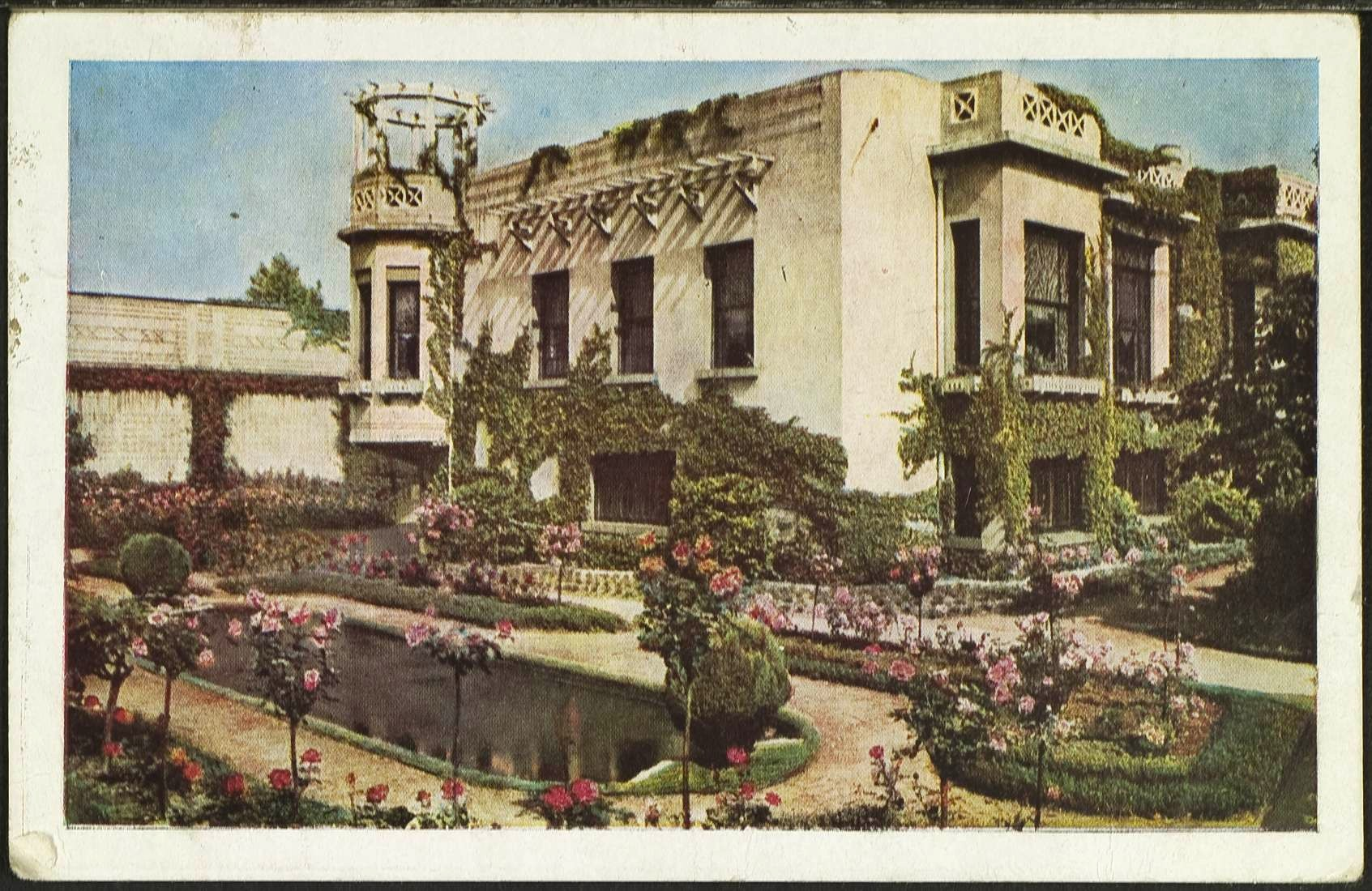
Villa Lafont, postcard

Pauline Lafont was personally responsible for the interior decoration, which was in the style of the Pompeii villas. The interior featured a painted frieze by R. Burretta, bas-reliefs by Cavina and marble decoration by Ernesto Giavina; several stained-glass windows were designed by Joannès Mayosson, and others by Jacques Grüber of Nancy, who came from the Lafonts' former apartment in Lyon.

== Social initiatives ==
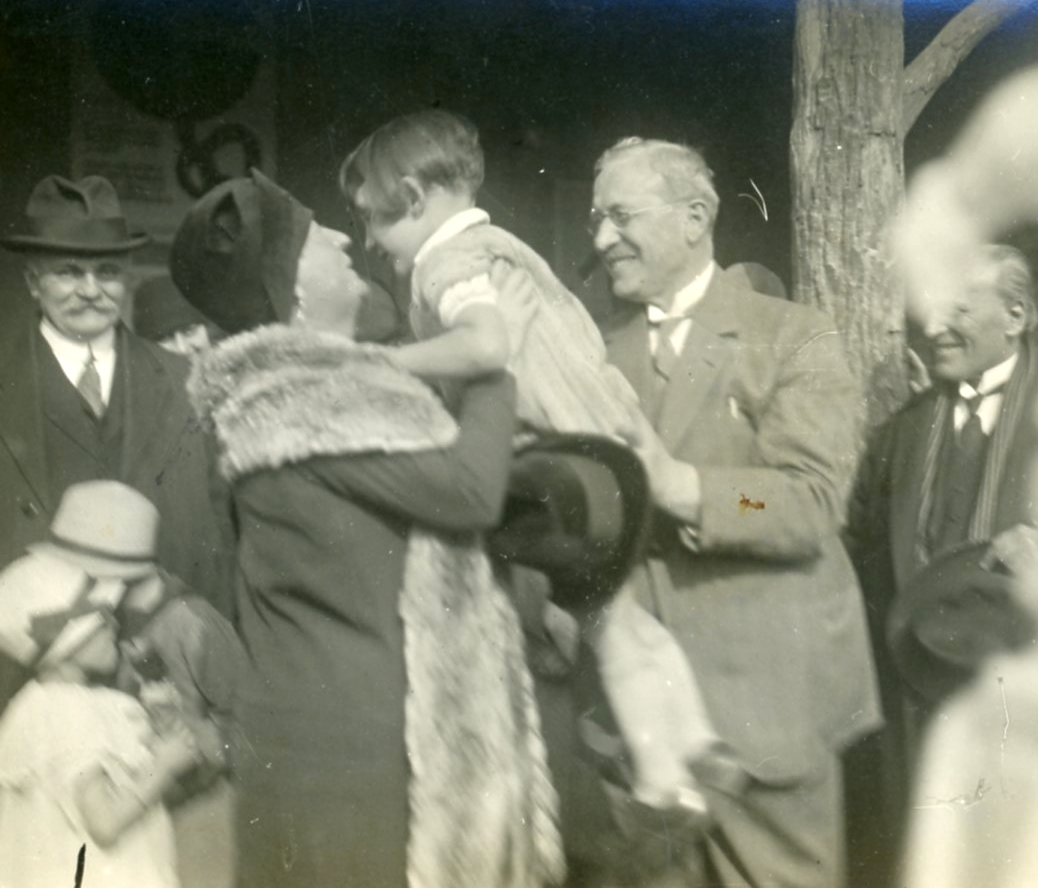
Inauguration of the Jardin des Tout-petits in Villeurbanne with Mayor Lazare Goujon in 1929.

Pauline Lafont was deeply involved in social initiatives both within the Lafont company and in other areas. She set up a child care center and an internal pension fund for her employees.

During World War I, she welcomed convalescing allied soldiers to the Lafont family estate in the Valromey village. With factories at a standstill, the company organized soup kitchens on its Monplaisir premises. She donated real estate to the Salvation Army. Realizing that there was no kindergarten for young children, and wanting to get involved in the social policy of the city of Villeurbanne, which was developing a hygienic policy at the time, in 1925 she donated a plot of land adjacent to her villa to the town hall to set up a garden reserved for children under the age of six. This was to become one of Villeurbanne's first squares for children, known as the Jardin des Tout-petits (kindergarten). She was involved in the project from the outset, and attended its inauguration. Later, in 1994, the square was renamed Jardin des Tout-petits-Adolphe-Lafont in tribute to the Lafont family.

In 1955, she expressed the wish to give up her rose garden adjacent to her villa and turn it into a public garden. Throughout her life, she had looked after it personally, with the help of rose gardener Meilland. The town became the owner in 1956, after Pauline's death.

== Cultural events ==
In the 1920s, photographs documented her regular attendance at air shows, where she was in contact with the aviators of the day. She and her husband were members of the Rhône flying club. Her daughter Marcelle became a pilot, as well as a chemist, chemical engineer, member of the French Resistance and politician.

In 1935, Pauline's brother-in-law Ernest Lafont set up the Lyon La Doua radio station, and looking for volunteer hosts, asked his sister-in-law to take charge of the women's and children's programs. She ran several columns herself and recruited hosts, including her own daughter Marcelle. She also organized live public broadcasts from the Lyon Conservatory.

The Lafont family had close ties with Auguste and Louis Lumière, and Pauline Lafont's written correspondence with the Lumières showed a real interest in technological advances in photography.

== Bibliography ==
- Bazin, M.J. (June 1986). "La famille Adolphe Lafont". Rive Gauche, Société d'histoire de Lyon (in French) (97): 15.
- Béghain, Patrice; Benoit, Bruno; Corneloup, Gérard; Thévenon, Bruno (2009). Dictionnaire historique de Lyon (in French). Lyon: Stéphane Bachès. pp. 742–744. ISBN 978-2-915266-65-8. BNF: 42001687j.
- Navrot, Jacques (March 2020). "La saga des Lafont". Rive Gauche, Société d'histoire de Lyon (in French) (164): 20.
- Angleraud, Bernadette; Bôle du Chaumont, Marie-Christine; Etèvenaux, Jean; Pélissier, Catherine; Long, Guetty (2005). Lyonnaises d'hier et d'aujourd'hui (in French). Lyon: Bellier. p. 47. ISBN 2-84631-136-6. OCLC 62087753.
