= André Clayeux =

French triple jumper

Personal information
- Nationality: French
- Born: 2 April 1897 Montluçon, France
- Died: 30 January 1971 (aged 73)

Sport
- Sport: Athletics
- Event: Triple jump

André Clayeux (2 April 1897 – 30 January 1971) was a French athlete, soldier and sports director

== Sports career ==
He competed in the men's triple jump at the 1924 Summer Olympics.

== Second World War ==
Clayeux was Commander of the French 62nd Tank Battalion during the Second World War and taken prisoner on 25 June 1940. He was detained at Oflag XII-B, a German prisoner of war camp for officers in Mainz Citadel. Marcelle Lafont discovered his presence there in 1942 as part of her work for the French Red Cross.

== Personal life ==
He was the life partner of the chemical engineer and politician Marcelle Lafont.
