= Drususstein =

Masonry block in Mainz, Germany

Coordinates: 49°59′32″N 8°16′27″E

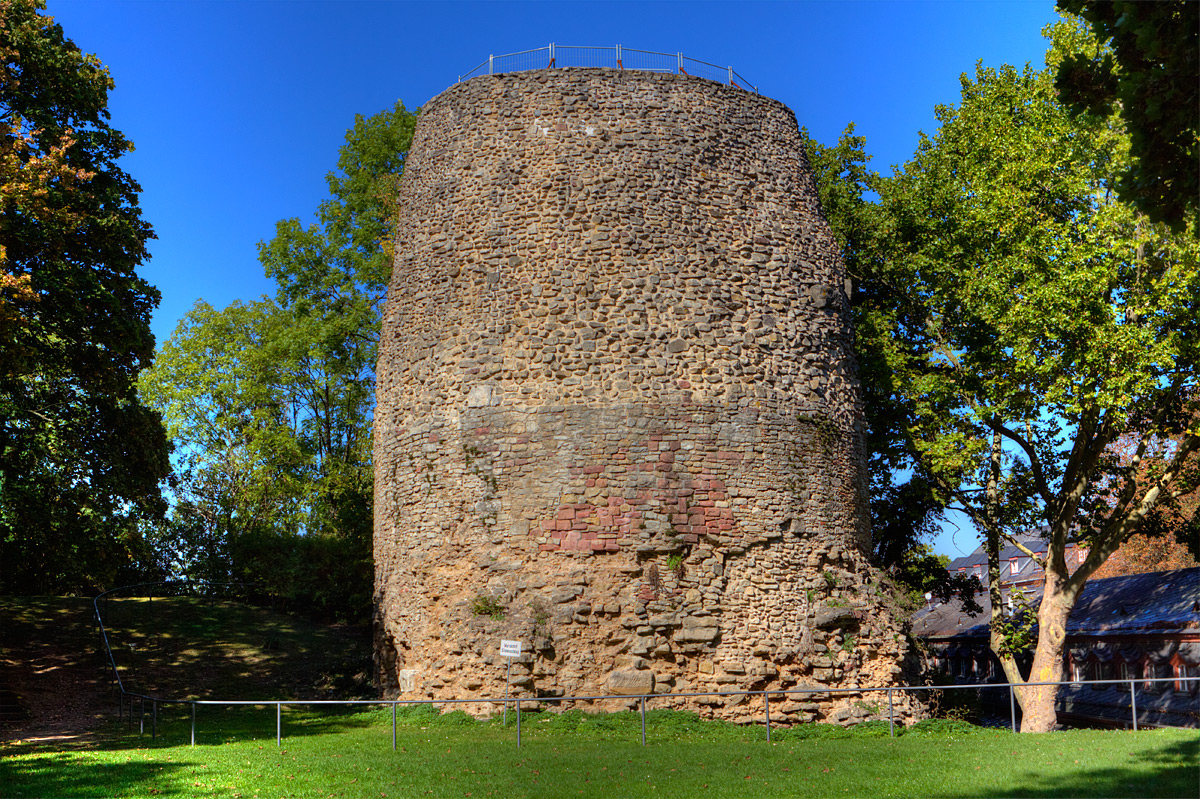
The Drususstein in the Mainz Citadel (2011)

The Drususstein ("Drusus stone") is a nearly 20-metre-high masonry block of Roman origin in the grounds of the citadel of Mainz, Germany. It was originally cased in marble. Researchers now largely accept that it is a remnant of the cenotaph mentioned by writers such as Eutropius and Suetonius, erected in 9 BC by Roman troops in honour of the deceased general Drusus, in Mogontiacum (now Mainz).

During the early days of the Principate, the Drususstein was the starting point for elaborate memorial services in honour of Drusus, and the centre of the imperial cult in Mogontiacum. A procession road linked it to the theatre of Mogontiacum, which contained approximately 12,000 seats, making it the largest known theatre north of the Alps. It may have hosted a part of the annual ceremonies at the day of Drusus' death, and probably also at his birthday.

After being robbed of its marble casing in the early Middle Ages, the Drususstein served as a watchtower in the fortifications of the city in the 16th century. For that purpose a staircase and doorframe were made in the structure, which had been up to that point a solid building. Besides the pillars of aqueducts and the stage of the theatre, the Drususstein is one of the few remaining visible reminders of Roman Mogontiacum. Together with the Igel Column, it is the only funerary monument north of the Alps dating from antiquity that remains in its original location.

== Historical background ==
The Roman general Nero Claudius Drusus, stepson of Augustus, founded the legionary camp of Mogontiacum opposite the mouth of the River Main, no later than 13–12 BC. It was intended to serve as a strategic starting point for the conquest of Magna Germania. During the campaign in 9 BC Drusus died. His brother Tiberius and the Roman army returned his body back to Mogontiacum. Before the transfer of the body to Rome, the soldiers honoured their popular commander with a memorial ceremony. During this time the apparently spontaneous wish arose among the soldiers to erect a monument to permanently honour Drusus in Mogontiacum. Appropriate construction activities were probably already ongoing in the immediate vicinity of the legionary camp, as Augustus approved the project retroactively. As a special tribute to Drusus, Augustus himself wrote a grave inscription (elogium) which was attached to the cenotaph. With this the building was completed.

== Fictional references ==
The ceremonies at the Drususstein feature as a major plot element in volume 2 of the novel series Romanike.

== Gallery ==
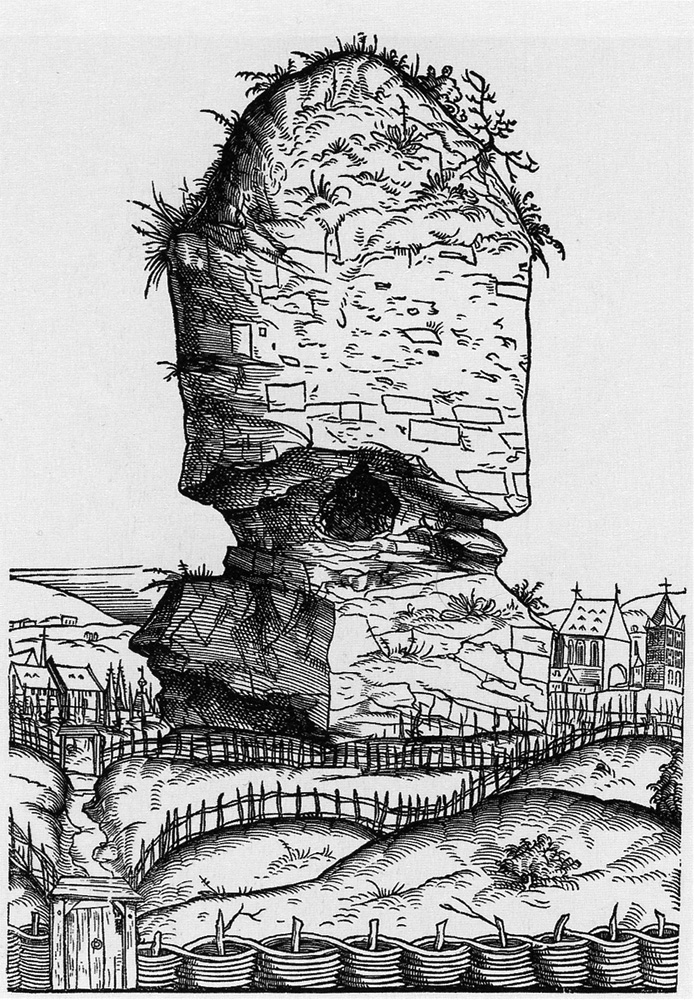
Image by Johannes Huttich (woodcut, between 1512/13 and 1517)

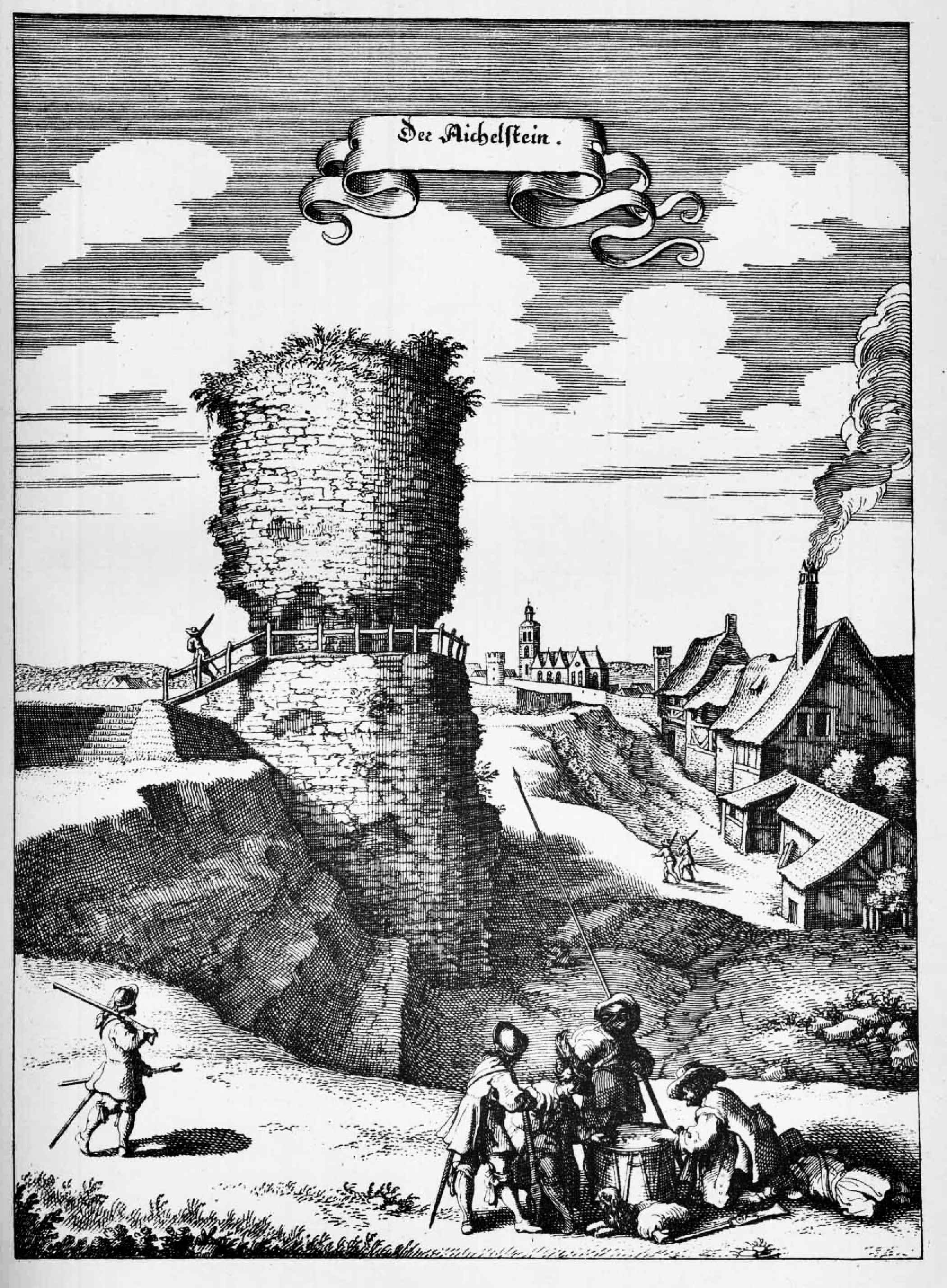
Image in Matthäus Merian's Topographia Germaniae (engraving, 1646)

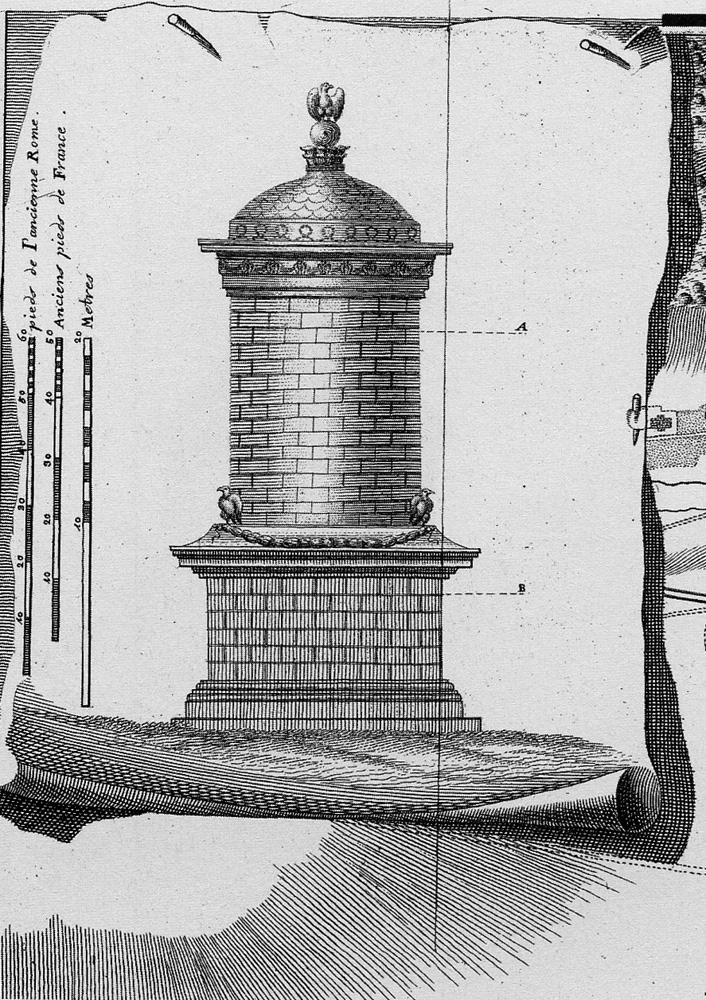
Reconstruction by F. Lehne, 1811

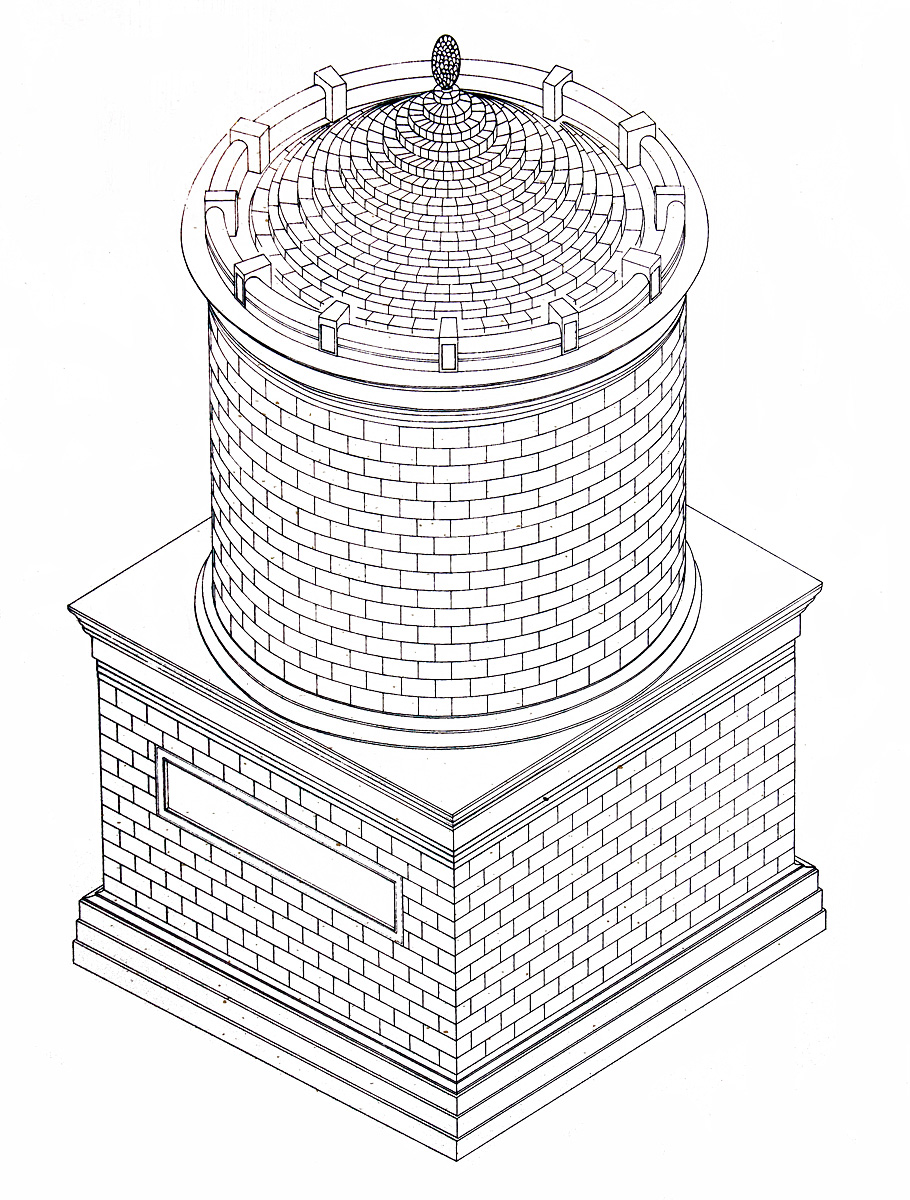
Reconstruction by Hans G. Frenz, 1985

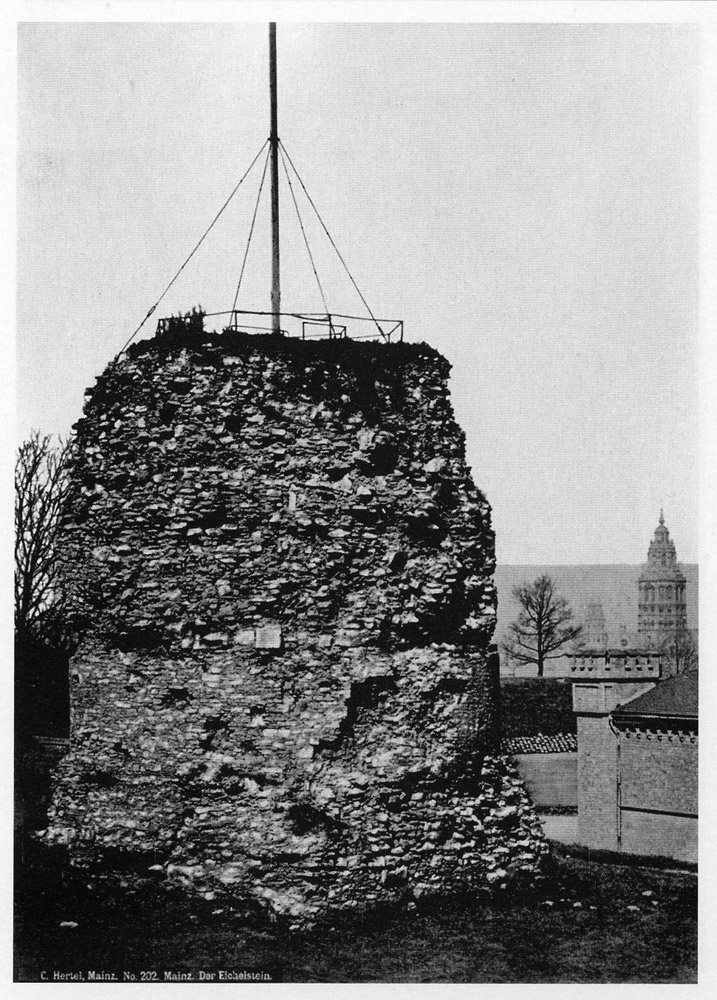
Early photograph of the Drususstein with flagstaff (1892 or 1895/96)

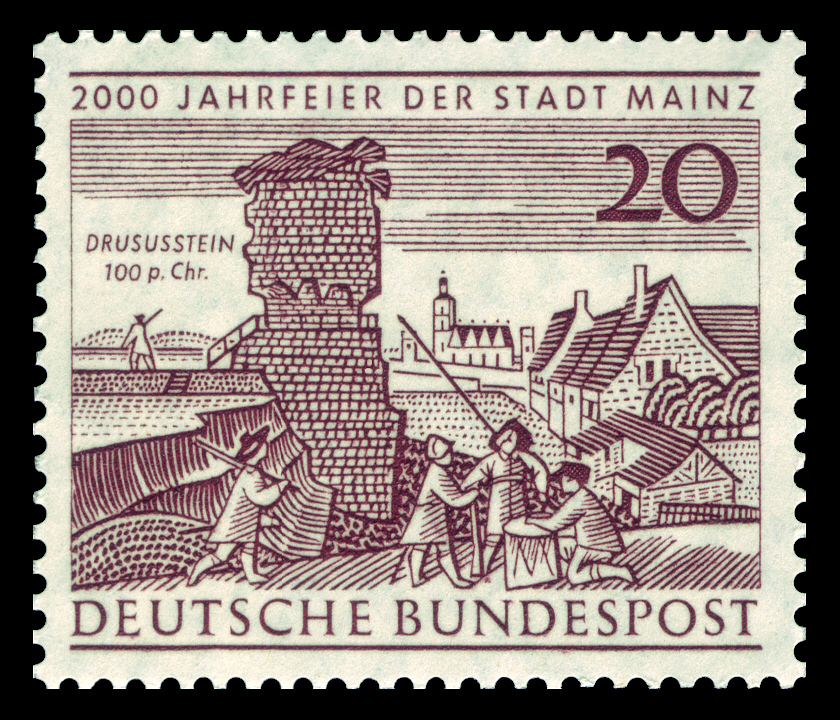
Postage stamp celebrating the city of Mainz's 2000th anniversary, 1962

== Literature ==
- Bellen, Heinz (1997). Schumacher, Leonhard (ed.). Das Drususdenkmal apud Mogontiacum und die Galliarum civitas [Politik-Recht-Gesellschaft. Studien zur Alten Geschichte]. Historia Einzelschriften (in German). Vol. 115. p. 85 ff.
- Decker, Karl-Viktor; Selzer, Wolfgang (1976). Temporini, Hildegard; Haase, Wolfgang (eds.). Mainz von der Zeit des Augustus bis zum Ende der römischen Herrschaft. [Aufstieg und Niedergang der römischen Welt: Geschichte und Kultur Roms im Spiegel der neueren Forschung.] (in German). Vol. II.5.1. Berlin: Walter de Gruyter. pp. 457–559. ISBN 3-11-006690-4.
- Frenz, Hans. G. (1985). Drusus maior und sein Monument zu Mainz. [Jahrbuch des Römisch-Germanischen Zentralmuseums Mainz] (in German). Vol. 32. pp. 394–421.
- Panter, Andreas (2007). Der Drususstein in Mainz und dessen Einordnung in die römische Grabarchitektur seiner Erbauungszeit. [Mainzer Archäologische Schriften] (in German). Vol. 6. Mainz: Archäologische Denkmalpflege Amt Mainz. ISBN 978-3-935970-03-7.
- Pelgen, Franz Stephan (2003). Mainz. Vom "elenden Steinklumpen" zum Denkmal. Aus der Geschichte der Mainzer Römerruinen (in German). Mainz: Philipp von Zabern. ISBN 3-8053-3283-1.
- Selzer, Wolfgang; Karl-Victor Decker; Anibal Do Paco (1988). Römische Steindenkmäler. Mainz in römischer Zeit (in German). Mainz: Philipp von Zabern. ISBN 3-8053-0993-7.
- Spickermann, Wolfgang (2006). Cancik, Hubert; Schäfer, Alfred; Spickermann, Wolfgang (eds.). Mogontiacum (Mainz) als politischer und religiöser Zentralort der Germania superior. [Zentralität und Religion]. Studien und Texte zu Antike und Christentum (in German). Vol. 39. Tübingen: Mohr Siebeck. ISBN 3-16-149155-6.
