= Haut Valromey =

Commune in Auvergne-Rhône-Alpes, France

- Commune
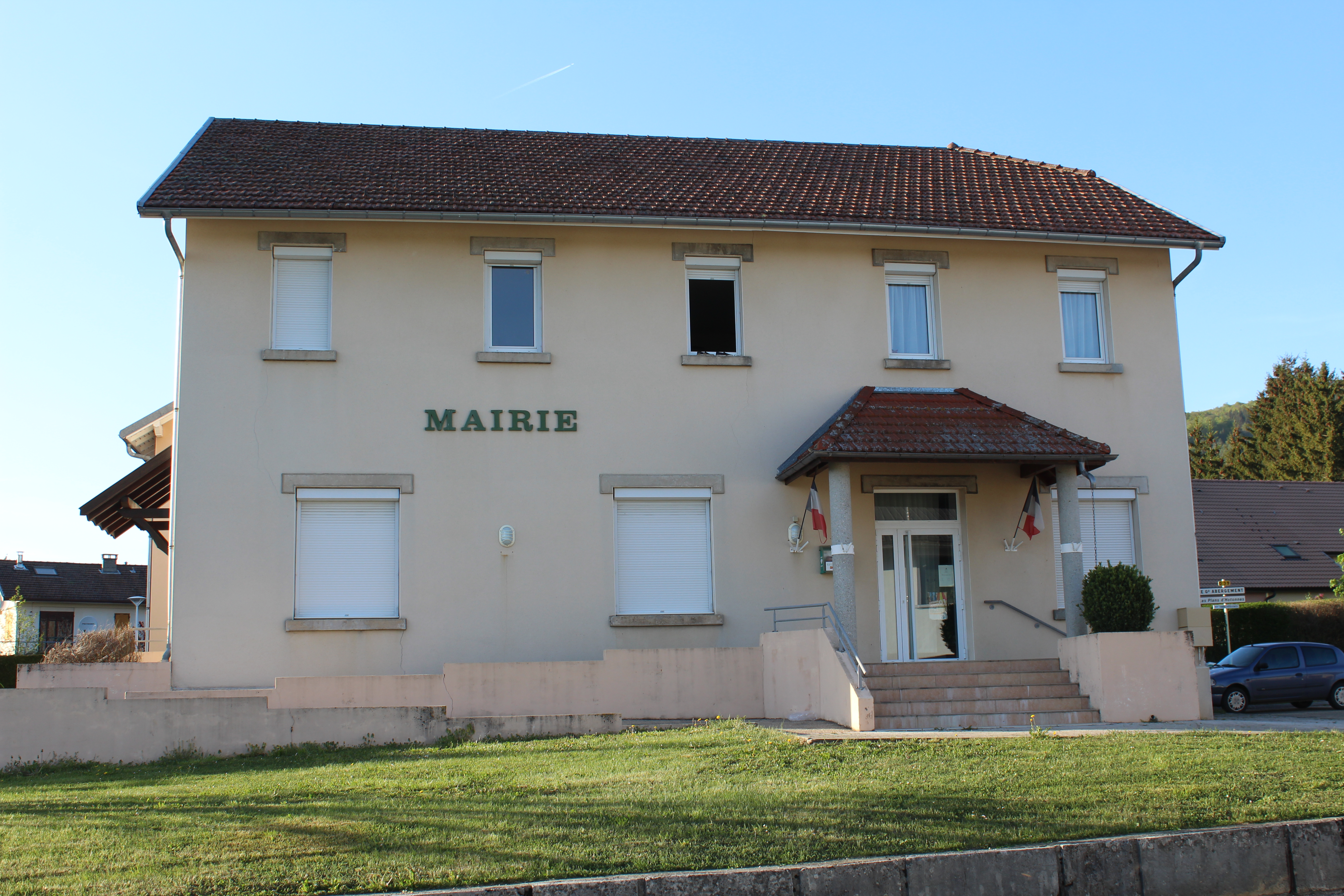
- Town hall
- Location of Haut Valromey
- Location within France Location within Auvergne-Rhône-Alpes
- Coordinates: 45°59′53″N 5°41′38″E
- Country: France
- Region: Auvergne-Rhône-Alpes
- Department: Ain
- Arrondissement: Belley
- Canton: Plateau d'Hauteville
- Intercommunality: Bugey Sud

Government
  - Mayor (2020–2026): Bernard Ancian
- Area^{1}: 121.88 km^{2} (47.06 sq mi)
- Population (2023): 801
  - Density: 6.57/km^{2} (17.0/sq mi)
- Time zone: UTC+01:00 (CET)
  - Summer (DST): UTC+02:00 (CEST)
- INSEE/Postal code: 01187 /01260
- ^{1} French Land Register data, which excludes lakes, ponds, glaciers > 1 km^{2} (0.386 sq mi or 247 acres) and river estuaries.

Haut Valromey (French pronunciation: [o valʁɔmɛ], lit. 'Upper Valromey') is a commune in the Ain department of eastern France. The municipality was established on 1 January 2016 and consists of the former communes of Hotonnes, Le Grand-Abergement, Le Petit-Abergement and Songieu. On 1 January 2025, the former commune of Ruffieu was merged into Haut Valromey.

== See also ==
- Communes of the Ain department
