= Rose Warfman =

French survivor of Auschwitz and member of the French Resistance

- Born: Rose Gluck; 4 October 1916; Zürich, Switzerland
- Died: 17 September 2016 (aged 99); Manchester, England, UK
- Occupation: Nurse
- Spouse: Nachman Warfman
- Children: Bernard, Salomon David, Anne

Rose Warfman (née Gluck; 4 October 1916 – 17 September 2016) was a French survivor of Auschwitz and member of the French Resistance.

== Biography ==
=== Early life ===
Gluck was born on 4 March 1916 in Zürich, Switzerland, the daughter of Pinhas Gluck-Friedman (1886–1964) and Henia Shipper (1887–1968). Her father was a direct descendant of Hasidic Masters, going back to the Magid Dov Ber of Mezeritch (1704–1772), the disciple and successor of the Baal Shem Tov (1698–1760). She had two sisters, Antoinette Feuerwerker (1912-2003) and Hendel (Hedwig) Naftalis (1913-?), and a brother Salomon Gluck (born 1914-died during WWII).

=== Strasbourg and Paris ===
Her parents had moved from Tarnów in Galicia, Poland, to Belgium, then to Switzerland, during World War I. The family moved further to Germany, and finally to France in 1921, settling in Strasbourg. There she went to the famous Lycée des Pontonniers, now called Lycée International des Pontonniers. After moving to Paris, with her family, she studied in 1941 and 1942 to become a nurse, in the modern Ecole de puériculture, 26, boulevard Brune, in Paris 14. She worked before World War II at the COJASOR, a Jewish social service organization, together with Lucie Dreyfus (née Hadamard; 1869–1945), the widow of Alfred Dreyfus.

=== French Resistance ===
During World War II, she joined her sister, Antoinette Feuerwerker, and her husband, Rabbi David Feuerwerker, in Brive-la-Gaillarde. They worked together with Edmond Michelet, the future Senior Minister of Charles de Gaulle, in the major Movement of the French Resistance, Combat. In Michelet's Memoirs, she is mentioned as one of the active agents for Combat. Her name in the Résistance was Marie Rose Girardin.

She was arrested in the Synagogue of Brive in March 1944, taken to Drancy internment camp, and from there, on convoy 72, on 29 April 1944, to Auschwitz concentration camp. Her sister Antoinette Feuerwerker succeeded in getting her a nurse's uniform when she was at Drancy internment camp. She wore that uniform on her arrival in Auschwitz. Dr Josef Mengele, the infamous Nazi doctor, singled her out for survival. Later, he operated on her, without anesthesia. She survived three selections in Auschwitz concentration camp (Auschwitz-Birkenau), and later was transferred to the Gross-Rosen concentration camp, before being liberated by the Russian Army in February 1945. The number tattooed on her arm at Auschwitz was 80598. Underneath there is a triangle, meaning she is a Jew.

=== Auschwitz ===
Convoy 72 took her to Auschwitz on 29 April 1944. Serge Klarsfeld described the convoy:

This convoy takes 1004 Jews, and includes 398 men and 606 women. Among them were 174 children below 18. The poet Itzak Katznelson (Itzhak Katzenelson) is among the deportees of this convoy, as well as many Poles, arrested as he was in Vittel, after having been transferred from Poland. There are families: the children Dodelzak, Ita 12, Georges 3 and Arkadius 3 months; the Rottenberg, Naphtalie 7, Nathan 5, Esther 4, Frantz 2,... On arrival at Auschwitz, 48 men were selectioned with the numbers 186596 to 186643 and 52 women, whose numbers are around 80600. In 1945, there were 37 survivors, including 25 women.

Her brother, Dr. Salomon Gluck was deported on the next convoy, convoy 73, leaving Drancy internment camp on 15 May 1944.

At Birkenau, she was assigned to a group of 50 women who were forced by a kapo to knit undershirts for German newborns. She worked hard, and was well thought-of, but when they were asked to knit socks for men, she resisted by making big knots inside the garments so as to render them unusable. In her block in Auschwitz was another detainee that she saw daily, the future politician Simone Veil.

=== Gross-Rosen ===
The Gross-Rosen concentration camp was situated near Breslau (called today Wrocław in Poland) railway station. There Warfman was made to work in a munitions factory from six in the evening to six in the morning, with one half-hour break, and regular beatings.

=== Later life ===
After the war, she returned to Paris. She became the first employee of the new Israeli Airlines, El Al, when it opened in Paris, with a director, Mr. Massis. She welcomed and guided many Israeli leaders during their stays in Paris, including Golda Meir, and David Ben-Gurion. In 1947 she forged identity cards for Mossad LeAliyah Bet to issue to Jewish refugees to embark aboard Exodus 1947. Together with Abbé Alexandre Glasberg, recognized posthumously as a Righteous Among the Nations by the Yad Vashem, Jerusalem, Israel, for saving Jews during the war.

== Honors ==
On 10 February 1959, she was awarded the title of Knight of the Legion of Honour by the French Government for her work in the French Resistance. She also was awarded the Médaille Militaire 1939–1945, the Croix de Guerre 1939–1945, and the Croix du combattant volontaire de la Résistance. On 10 April 2009, the French Government made her an Officer of the Legion of Honor.

== Personal life ==
She was married to Nachman Warfman, a Doctor in Law (University of Grenoble) and a certified public accountant (CPA). She had three children: Bernard, Salomon David, and Anne. She moved to Manchester, England, to be close to her children, her grandchildren and her great grandchildren. She died in Manchester on 17 September 2016, 17 days short of her 100th birthday.
