= Antoinette Feuerwerker =

French jurist and active fighter in the French Resistance

- Born: 24 November 1912; Antwerp, Belgium
- Died: 10 February 2003 (aged 90); Jerusalem, Israel
- Occupations: Jurist and economist
- Spouse: Rabbi David Feuerwerker
- Children: Atara, Natania, Elie, Hillel, Emmanuel, Benjamine

Antoinette Feuerwerker (24 November 1912 – 10 February 2003) was a French jurist and an active fighter in the French Resistance during the Second World War.

== Early years ==
Antoinette (Antonia, Toni, Toibe Rochel) Gluck was born in Antwerp (Borgerhout), Belgium. She was the daughter of Pinchas Gluck-Friedman and Henia Shipper.

Her father was a direct descendant of Hasidic leaders going back to the Magid Dov Ber of Mezeritch. During World War I, the family moved from Poland to Belgium, and from there to Switzerland where her three siblings, Rose Warfman, Hedwig [Heidi], and Salomon Gluck were born, then to Germany, and finally to France, where they became citizens. Feuerwerker studied at the Lycée des Pontonniers (now Lycée international des Pontonniers) in Strasbourg.

After her Baccalauréat, she studied law, a rarity in those days for a woman. One of her professors, René Capitant, became Minister of Education (1944–1945) in the Provisional Government and Minister of Justice (Attorney General) (1968–69) under Charles de Gaulle. She worked in René Capitant's law firm. She graduated from business school (HEC).

With her family, she moved to Paris, where she met David Feuerwerker, a young rabbi. They married in November 1939, at the beginning of World War II. David, deployed at the Maginot Line, had to obtain a special permit to attend the wedding. In June 1940, Feuerwerker moved to Brive-la-Gaillarde where her husband was the rabbi of three French Departments : Corrèze, Creuse, and Lot. They joined the Resistance movement "Combat" (the main Movement of the Résistance) to fight the Nazis.

=== Role in the Résistance ===
According to Combat, Feuerwerker actively participated in all the activities in the Résistance with her husband, Rabbi Feuerwerker, in particular recruiting liaison agents and distributing clandestine journals. Together with Germaine Ribière, who was later recognized as a Righteous Among the Nations, she organized the evacuation of young people hunted by the Nazis.

=== Escape from the Nazis ===
In the last months of World War II, she hid in a Catholic convent with her baby daughter, Atara, surviving on potatoes and water. She was later hidden by Germaine Goblot, daughter of French philosopher Edmond Goblot. Her sister, Rose Warfman, who was deported to Auschwitz, survived. Her brother, a 29-year young physician, Dr. Salomon Gluck, was deported from France on the convoy 73, led to Kaunas in Lithuania and Reval (Tallinn) in Estonia, never to return.

=== Role in the Exodus affair ===
In Neuilly-sur-Seine she was given a stash of gold coins for safekeeping which she hid under her husband's bed, without his knowledge. The money was used to finance the operation of the Aliyah Bet ship Exodus.

== Post-WWII ==
After the war, they moved to Lyon, where David Feuerwerker served as chief rabbi (1944–46). From 1946–48 he was the rabbi of Neuilly-sur-Seine, outside Paris. From 1948–66, they lived in Paris, in the Marais district, where her husband became the rabbi of the Rue des Tournelles synagogue. Feuerwerker collaborated with her husband in his research on the emancipation of the Jews of France. In 1966, they settled in Montreal, Quebec, where Feuerwerker taught law and economics at the Collège Français.

== Personal life/death ==
Feuerwerker and her husband had six children: Atara, Natania, Elie, Hillel, Emmanuel, and Benjamine. Her husband died on 20 June 1980. She moved to Israel, where she spent the last three years of her life. She died on 10 February 2003, aged 90, and was buried in Sanhedria, Jerusalem, next to her husband.

== Medals ==
As a Combattante Volontaire de la Résistance (Voluntary Combatant of the Resistance), she received the French Liberation Medal. Later the French government awarded her the Palmes Académiques and the Médaille de la Santé Publique, for her contributions to public education and public health.
