= Salomon Gluck =

French physician

- Born: 5 November 1914; Zürich, Switzerland
- Died: c. 20 May 1944 (aged 29); Kaunas, Lithuania or Reval Tallinn, Estonia
- Occupation: Physician
- Parent(s): Paul Pinchas Gluck-Friedman (1886–1964) and Henia Shipper ( 1887–1968)

Abraham Salomon Glück (5 November 1914 – c. 20 May 1944) was a French physician and a member of the French Resistance.

== Biography ==
=== His ancestors ===
His father was a direct descendant of Hasidic Masters, going back to the Magid Dov Ber of Mezeritch (1704–1772), the disciple and successor of the Baal Shem Tov (1698–1760), the founder of Hasidism.

=== Family ===
He had three sisters, Antoinette Feuerwerker (1912–2003), Hendel (Hedwig, Heidi) Naftalis (1913–?) and Rose Warfman (1916–2016). His parents had moved from Tarnów in Galicia, Poland, to Belgium, then to Switzerland, during World War I.

=== From Switzerland to France ===
The family moved further to Germany, and finally to France in 1921, settling in Strasbourg.

=== Strasbourg: From High School to Medical School ===
Gluck started High School at Lycée Fustel de Coulanges, located next to the cathedral and he finished High School at the Lycée Kléber, closer to home, since the family had moved, and then went on to complete his medical studies at the Université de Strasbourg.

=== On the Maginot Line and at the Oflag ===
When World War II broke out, he had been in London, since 1938, doing an internship. Deciding to go back to France, he joined the French Army on 16 September 1939 and he was sent to the front, on the Maginot Line, as a second lieutenant, from 1939 to 1940. As an officer, he was taken as a prisoner at Oflag XII-B (Offizierlager) located in the Citadel of Mainz (Zitadelle Mainz), Germany, and recovered his freedom in 1941. Upon his release he received the Croix de Guerre 39-40.

=== Physician in Brôut-Vernet ===
Under the racist laws of Vichy France, he could not practice as a physician. Nevertheless, he did work as a physician in a Children's Home at Broût-Vernet (Allier), catering principally to young teenage orphans. The home was part of a network organized by OSE (Oeuvre de Secours aux Enfants).

=== Résistance in Brive ===
Aware of his imminent arrest, he joined his sisters, Rose Warfman, Antoinette Feuerwerker, and her husband, Rabbi David Feuerwerker, in Brive-la-Gaillarde, Corrèze. They worked together with Edmond Michelet in the Resistance movement "Combat". He left for Lyon, around February 1944, where he joined the Lyonese résistance.

=== Arrested by the Milice ===
He soon after was arrested by the Milice, when trying to protect his father brutalized by those agents, he openly stated his allegiance to the Résistance.

=== Taken to Montluc, Drancy, and on Convoy 73 ===
Taken to Montluc Prison in Lyon, then to Drancy (Drancy internment camp), next to Paris, on 11 May 1944, under the number 21530, he was deported on convoy 73, one of the rare trains from France carrying only men, and with the final destination being not Auschwitz, but Kaunas in Lithuania or Reval now called Tallinn in Estonia.

=== Eternal Remembrance ===
Abraham Salomon Gluck was probably murdered, alike most of the 878 men in convoy 73, on or around 20 May 1944. His name is inscribed on his father's tomb in Haifa, Israel, and on the Mur des Noms, at the Mémorial du Martyr Juif Inconnu, in Paris, France, as an eternal remembrance.

== Bibliography ==
- Serge Klarsfeld. Le Mémorial de la Déportation des Juifs de France. Beate et Serge Klarsfeld: Paris, 1978.
- Elie Feuerwerker. The Bench. Lesson In Emunah. The Jewish Press, New York, June 14, 1996.
- Elie Feuerwerker. France and the Nazis. Letter to the Editor. The New York Times, June 20, 2001.
- Hillel Feuerwerker. Salomon Gluck. In: " Nous Sommes 900 Français. IV. ", edited by Eve Line Blum-Cherchevsky, Paris, Besançon, 2003. ISBN 2-9513703-4-2
- Mordechai Naftalis. Déportés d'Alsace. Docteur Salomon Gluck.
- René Gutman. Le Memorbuch. Mémorial de la Déportation et de la Résistance des Juifs du Bas-Rhin. La Nuée Bleue: Strasbourg, 2005. ISBN 2-7165-0550-0
- Valery Bazarov. "In The Cross-Hairs: HIAS And The French Resistance." The Hidden Child. Vol. XXI, 2013, p. 8-11. [Published by Hidden Child Foundation/ADL, New York].
