= Le Petit-Abergement =

Part of Haut-Valromey in Auvergne-Rhône-Alpes, France

Le Petit Abergement
- Part of Haut Valromey
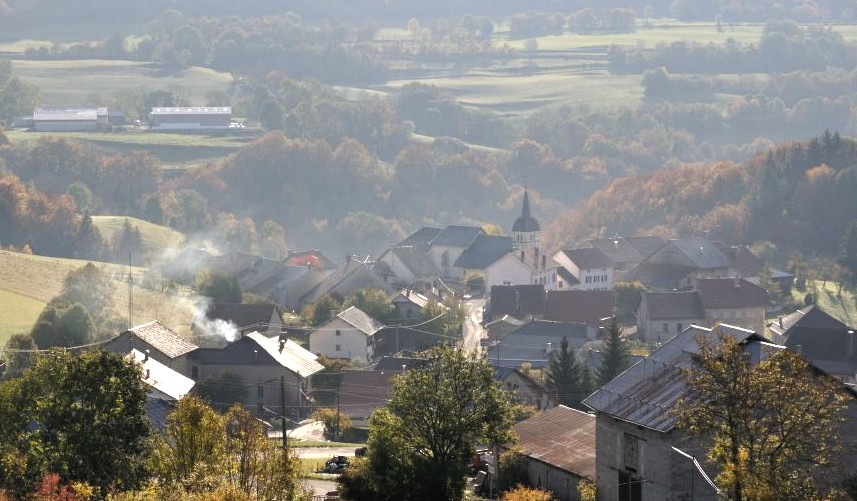
- Location of Le Petit Abergement
- Location within France Location within Auvergne-Rhône-Alpes
- Coordinates: 46°02′00″N 5°39′52″E
- Country: France
- Region: Auvergne-Rhône-Alpes
- Department: Ain
- Arrondissement: Belley
- Canton: Plateau d'Hauteville
- Commune: Haut Valromey
- Area^{1}: 26.95 km^{2} (10.41 sq mi)
- Highest elevation: 1,177 m (3,862 ft)
- Lowest elevation: 706 m (2,316 ft)
- Population (2019): 123
  - Density: 4.56/km^{2} (11.8/sq mi)
- Time zone: UTC+01:00 (CET)
  - Summer (DST): UTC+02:00 (CEST)
- Postal code: 01260
- ^{1} French Land Register data, which excludes lakes, ponds, glaciers > 1 km^{2} (0.386 sq mi or 247 acres) and river estuaries.

Le Petit-Abergement (French pronunciation: [lə pəti.t‿abɛʁʒəmɑ̃]) is a former commune in the Ain department in eastern France. On 1 January 2016, it was merged into the new commune Haut Valromey.

== Population ==
Historical population
Year	Pop.	±% p.a.
2006	141	—
2011	137	−0.57%
2019	123	−1.34%
Source: INSEE

== See also ==
- Communes of the Ain department
