= Le Grand-Abergement =

Part of Haut-Valromey in Auvergne-Rhône-Alpes, France

- Part of Haut Valromey
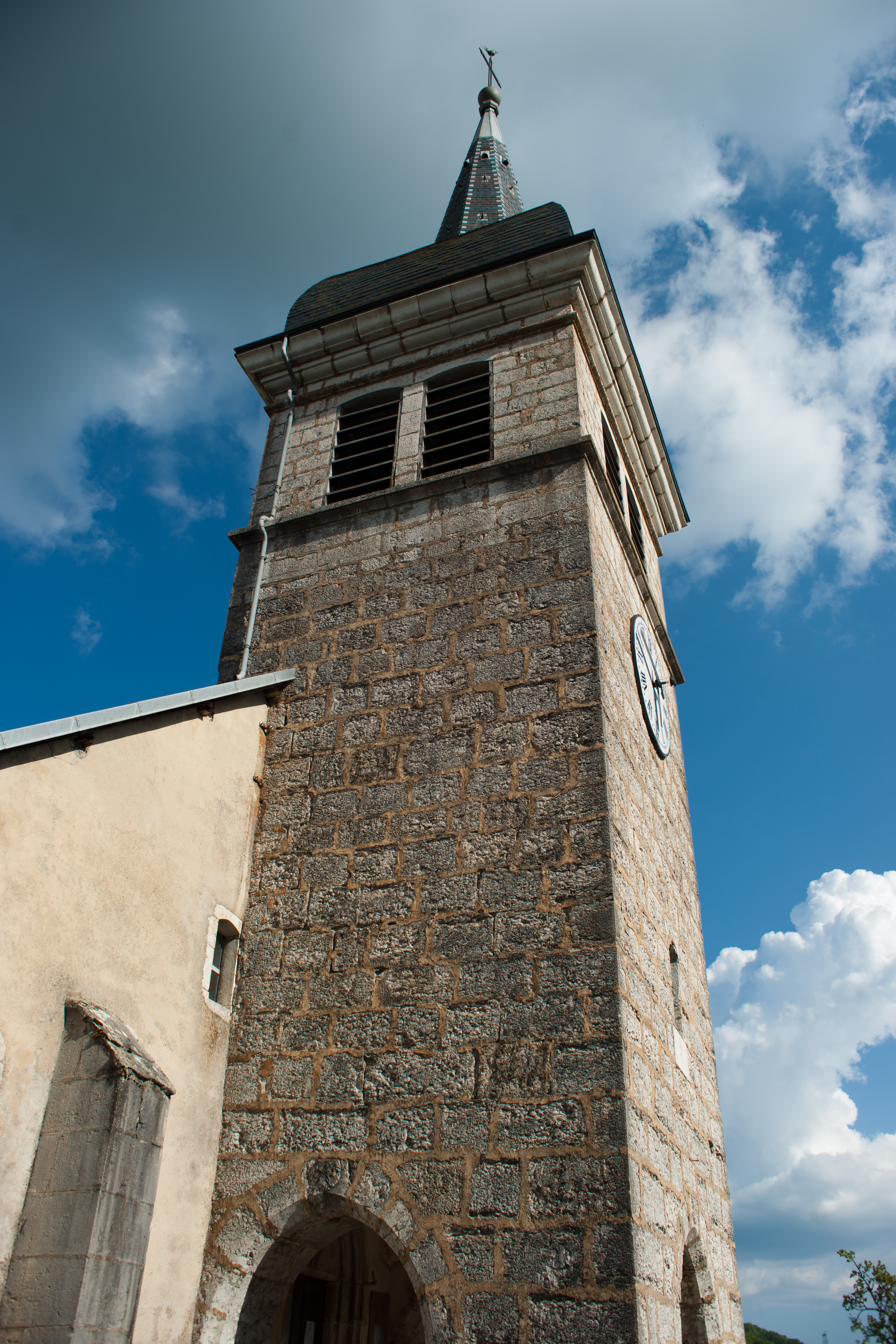
- Location of Le Grand-Abergement
- Location within France Location within Auvergne-Rhône-Alpes
- Coordinates: 46°02′05″N 5°40′32″E
- Country: France
- Region: Auvergne-Rhône-Alpes
- Department: Ain
- Arrondissement: Belley
- Canton: Plateau d'Hauteville
- Commune: Haut Valromey
- Area^{1}: 31.92 km^{2} (12.32 sq mi)
- Highest elevation: 1,293 m (4,242 ft)
- Lowest elevation: 696 m (2,283 ft)
- Population (2019): 111
  - Density: 3.48/km^{2} (9.01/sq mi)
- Time zone: UTC+01:00 (CET)
  - Summer (DST): UTC+02:00 (CEST)
- Postal code: 01260
- ^{1} French Land Register data, which excludes lakes, ponds, glaciers > 1 km^{2} (0.386 sq mi or 247 acres) and river estuaries.

Le Grand-Abergement (French pronunciation: [lə ɡʁɑ̃t‿abɛʁʒəmɑ̃]) is a former commune in the Ain department in eastern France. On 1 January 2016, it was merged into the new commune Haut Valromey.

== Population ==
Historical population
Year	Pop.	±% p.a.
2006	103	—
2011	108	+0.95%
2019	111	+0.34%
Source: INSEE

== See also ==
- Communes of the Ain department
