= Hotonnes =

Part of Haut-Valromey in Auvergne-Rhône-Alpes, France

- Part of Haut Valromey
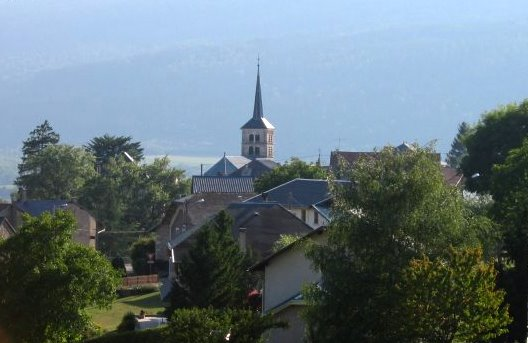
- Location of Hotonnes
- Location within France Location within Auvergne-Rhône-Alpes
- Coordinates: 45°59′53″N 5°41′38″E
- Country: France
- Region: Auvergne-Rhône-Alpes
- Department: Ain
- Arrondissement: Belley
- Canton: Plateau d'Hauteville
- Commune: Haut Valromey
- Area^{1}: 28.7 km^{2} (11.1 sq mi)
- Elevation: 736 m (2,415 ft)
- Highest elevation: 1,338 m (4,390 ft)
- Lowest elevation: 636 m (2,087 ft)
- Population (2019): 265
  - Density: 9.23/km^{2} (23.9/sq mi)
- Time zone: UTC+01:00 (CET)
  - Summer (DST): UTC+02:00 (CEST)
- Postal code: 01260
- ^{1} French Land Register data, which excludes lakes, ponds, glaciers > 1 km^{2} (0.386 sq mi or 247 acres) and river estuaries.

Hotonnes (French pronunciation: [ɔtɔn]) is a former commune in the Ain department in eastern France. On 1 January 2016, it was merged into the new commune Haut Valromey.

== Population ==
Historical population
Year	Pop.	±% p.a.
2006	299	—
2011	299	+0.00%
2019	265	−1.50%
Source: INSEE

== See also ==
- Communes of the Ain department
