= Ruffieu =

Former commune in Auvergne-Rhône-Alpes, France

- Part of Haut Valromey
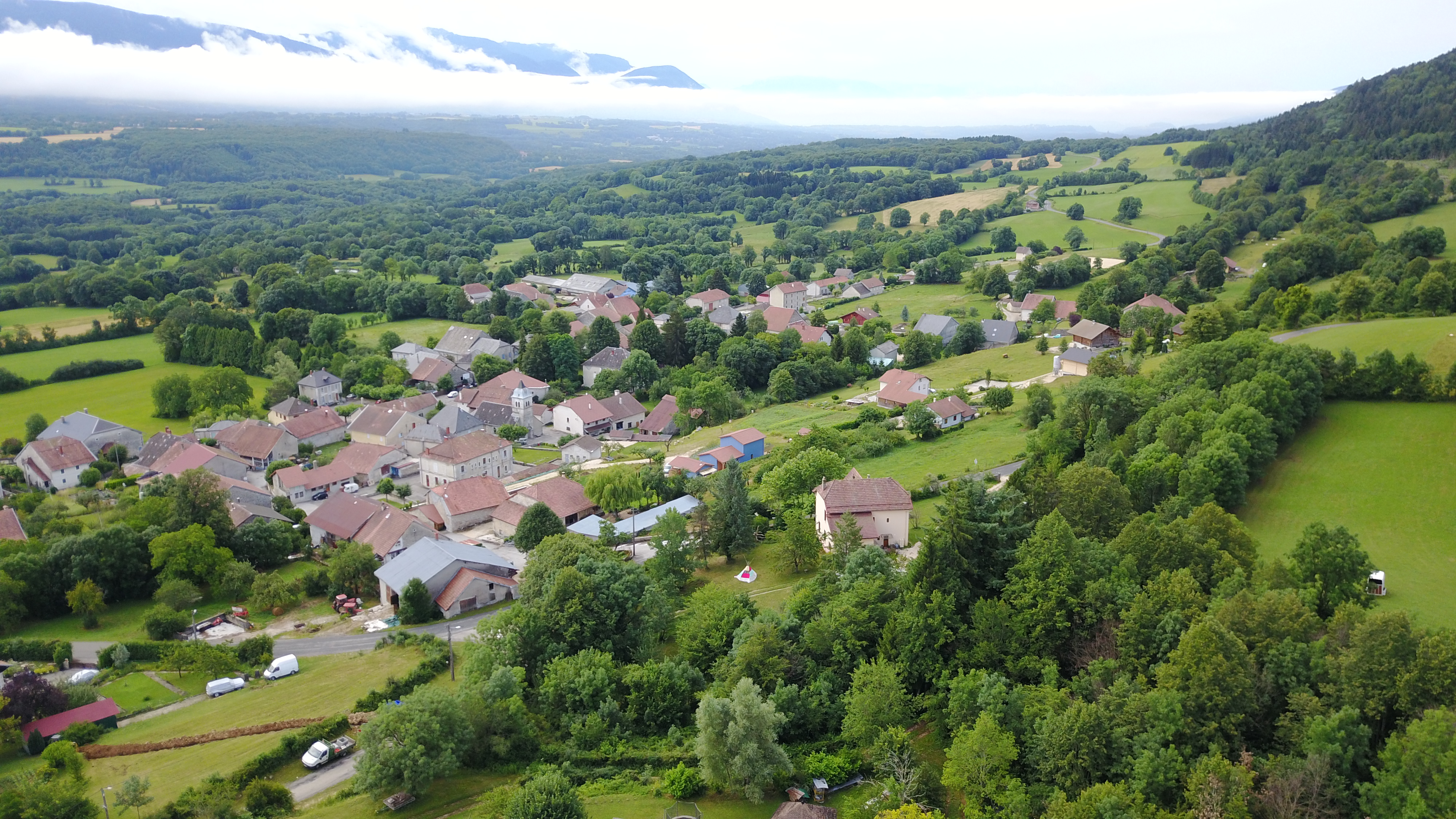
- Location of Ruffieu
- Location within France Location within Auvergne-Rhône-Alpes
- Coordinates: 45°59′39″N 5°39′48″E
- Country: France
- Region: Auvergne-Rhône-Alpes
- Department: Ain
- Arrondissement: Belley
- Canton: Plateau d'Hauteville
- Commune: Haut Valromey
- Area^{1}: 14.03 km^{2} (5.42 sq mi)
- Elevation: 720 m (2,360 ft)
- Highest elevation: 1,195 m (3,921 ft)
- Lowest elevation: 605 m (1,985 ft)
- Population (2022): 174
  - Density: 12.4/km^{2} (32.1/sq mi)
- Time zone: UTC+01:00 (CET)
  - Summer (DST): UTC+02:00 (CEST)
- Postal code: 01460
- ^{1} French Land Register data, which excludes lakes, ponds, glaciers > 1 km^{2} (0.386 sq mi or 247 acres) and river estuaries.

Ruffieu (French pronunciation: [ʁyfjø]) is a former commune in the Ain department in eastern France. On 1 January 2025, it was merged into the commune of Haut Valromey.

== Population ==
Historical population
Year	Pop.	±% p.a.
1968	232	—
1975	187	−3.03%
1982	162	−2.03%
1990	144	−1.46%
1999	188	+3.01%
2009	191	+0.16%
2014	187	−0.42%
2020	180	−0.63%
Source: INSEE

== See also ==
- Communes of the Ain department
