= Oflag XII-B =

German WWII POW camp in Mainz

- Mainz, Rhineland-Palatinate
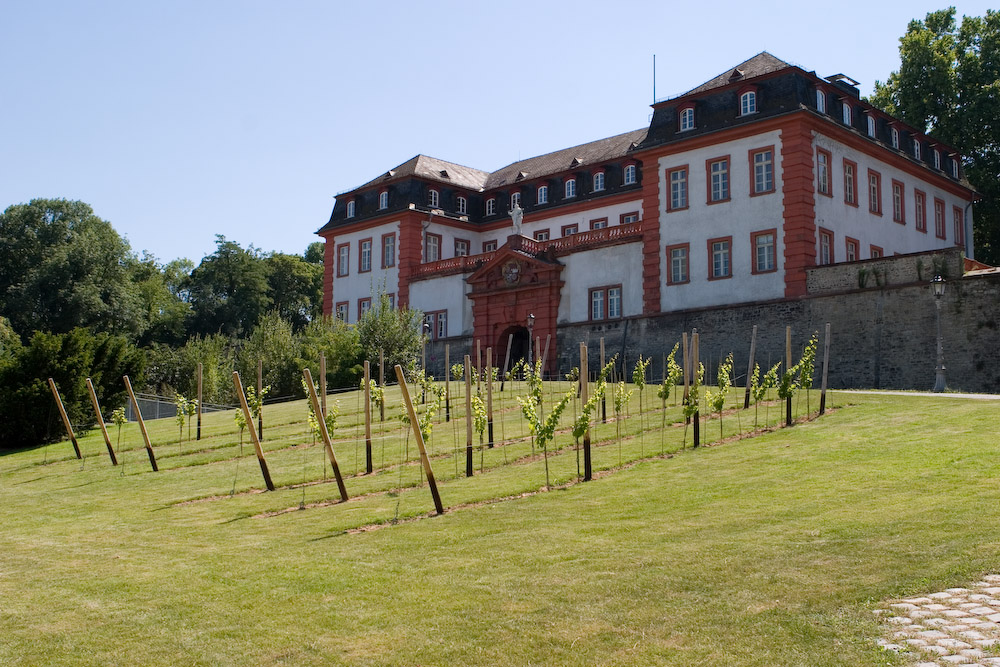
- Mainzer Zitadelle, 2005

Site information
- Type: Prisoner-of-war camp
- Controlled by: Nazi Germany

Location
- Mainz, Germany (pre-war borders, 1937)
- Coordinates: 49.99344°N 8.27422°E

Site history
- In use: 1940 – 1942

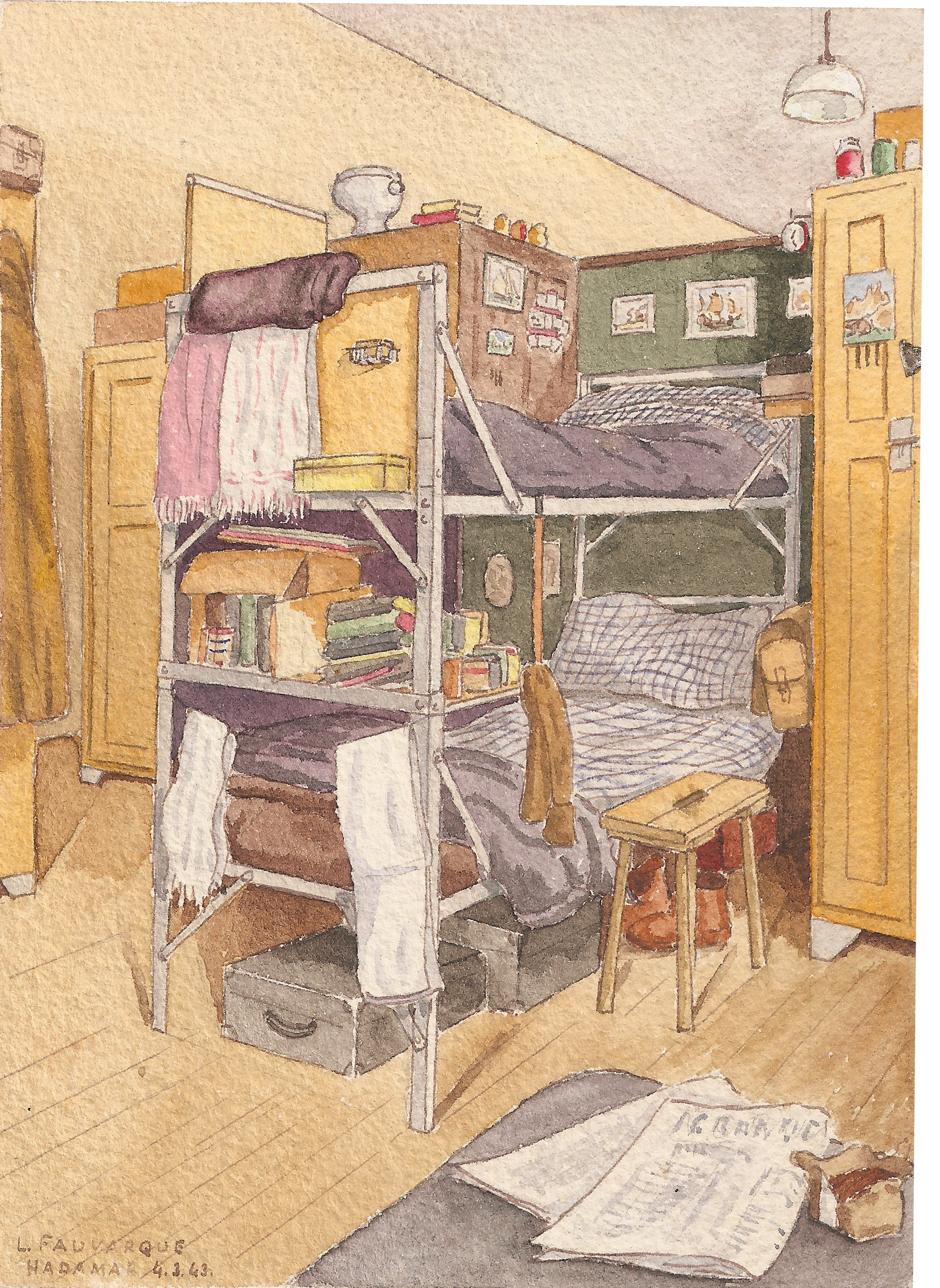
Aquarelle par Louis Fauvarque, lieutenant artilleur français : sa chambrée dans l’OFLAG XII B à Hadamar (peinte en mars 1943 et envoyée à sa famille). Watercolour by Louis Fauvarque, French artillery lieutenant: his room in OFLAG XII B at Hadamar (painted in March 1943 and sent to his family)

Oflag XII-B was a German World War II prisoner-of-war camp for officers (Offizierlager) located in the citadel of Mainz, in western Germany. The fortress had also served as an Oflag in World War I.

== Camp history ==
In June 1940 British, Belgian, Dutch and French senior officers and a small number of orderlies were transported to Mainz from transit camps in France and Belgium after the end of the Battle of France. In June 1942, all inmates were transferred to Oflag XII-A in Hadamar, near Limburg, which was then renumbered Oflag XII-B.

== Notable prisoners ==
- Sylvain Eugène Raynal (World War I)
- Salomon Gluck (World War II)
- Fernand Braudel (World War II)
- André Clayeux (World War II)
- André Schulmann (World War II)
- Paul-Louis Roche (World War II)
- Jean-Louis Morvan (World War II)
- Edward Ward, 7th Viscount Bangor (World War II)

== See also ==
- Oflag
- List of prisoner-of-war camps in Germany
