= Songieu =

Part of Haut-Valromey in Auvergne-Rhône-Alpes, France

- Part of Haut Valromey
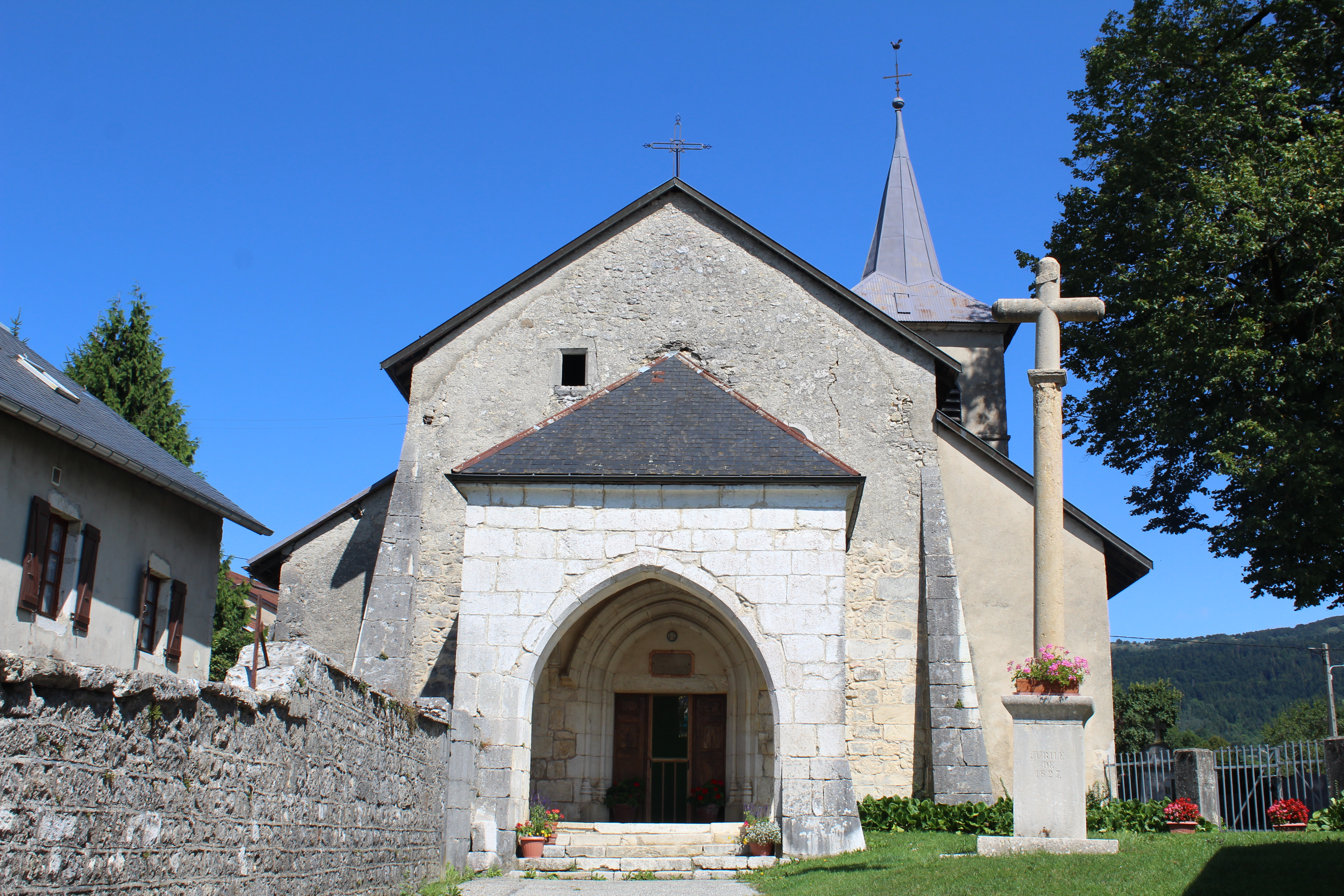
- Église St Martin
- Location of Songieu
- Location within France Location within Auvergne-Rhône-Alpes
- Coordinates: 45°58′24″N 5°42′08″E
- Country: France
- Region: Auvergne-Rhône-Alpes
- Department: Ain
- Arrondissement: Belley
- Canton: Plateau d'Hauteville
- Commune: Haut Valromey
- Area^{1}: 20.58 km^{2} (7.95 sq mi)
- Elevation: 750 m (2,460 ft)
- Highest elevation: 1,275 m (4,183 ft)
- Lowest elevation: 567 m (1,860 ft)
- Population (2019): 119
  - Density: 5.78/km^{2} (15.0/sq mi)
- Time zone: UTC+01:00 (CET)
  - Summer (DST): UTC+02:00 (CEST)
- Postal code: 01260
- ^{1} French Land Register data, which excludes lakes, ponds, glaciers > 1 km^{2} (0.386 sq mi or 247 acres) and river estuaries.

Songieu (French pronunciation: [sɔ̃ʒjø]) is a former commune in the Ain department in eastern France. On 1 January 2016, it was merged into the new commune Haut Valromey.

== Population ==
Historical population
Year	Pop.	±% p.a.
2006	118	—
2011	130	+1.96%
2019	119	−1.10%
Source: INSEE

== See also ==
- Communes of the Ain department
