= Mainz Citadel =

Coordinates: 49°59′35″N 8°16′27″E

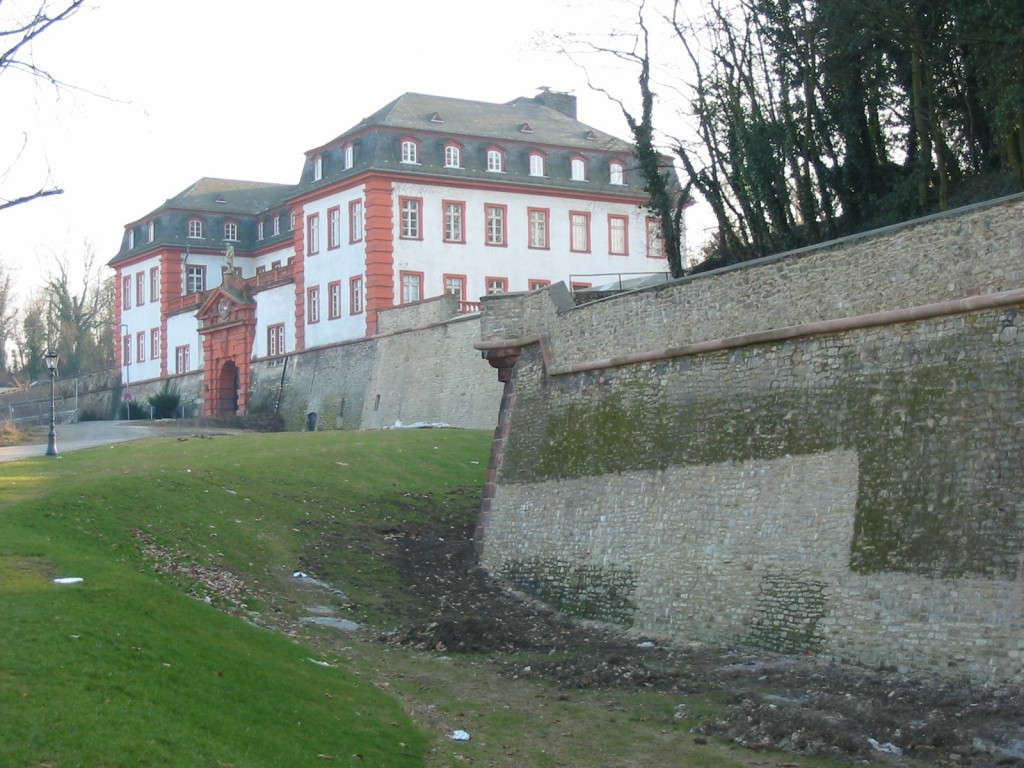
The Citadel of Mainz

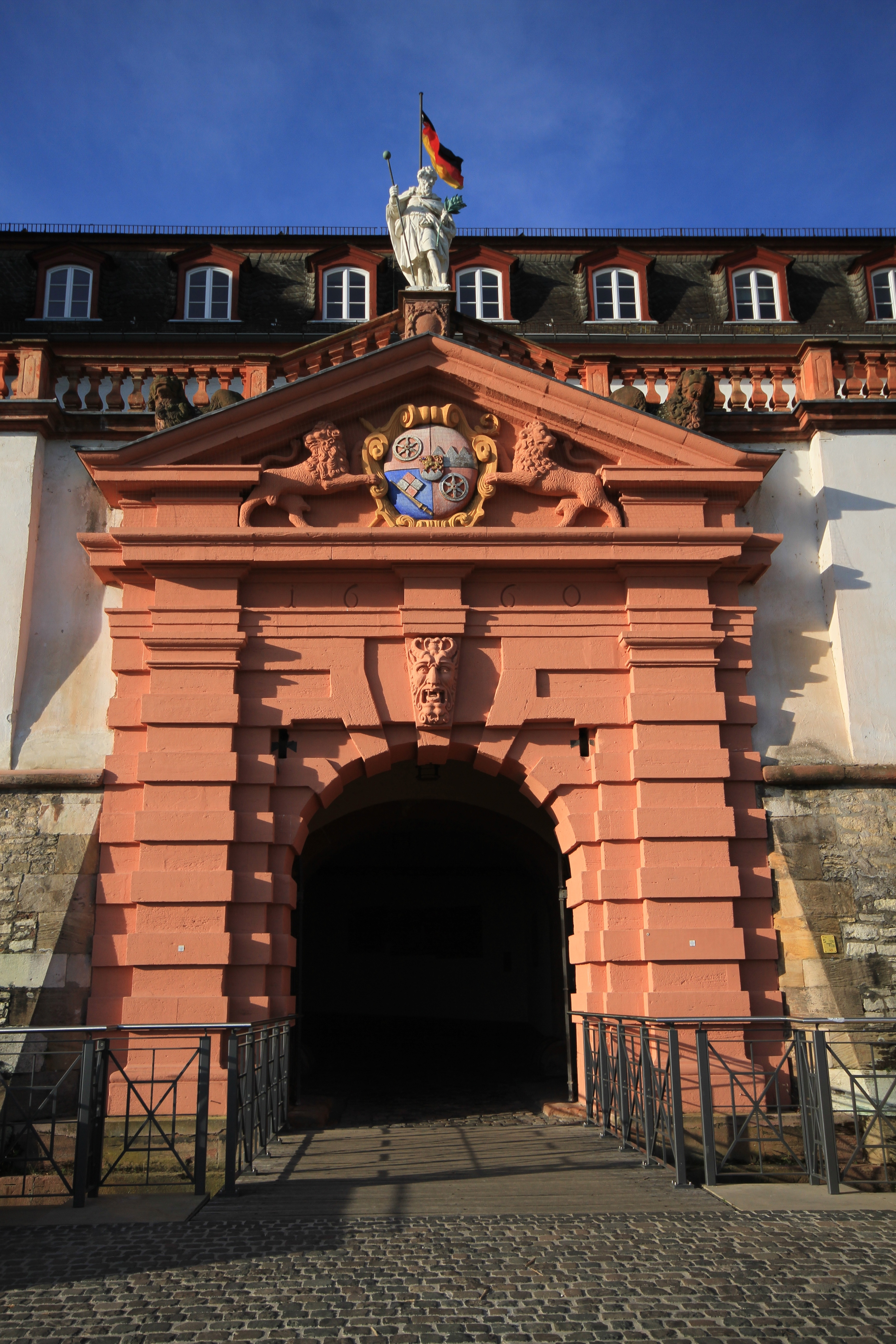
The Main Gate of the Citadel

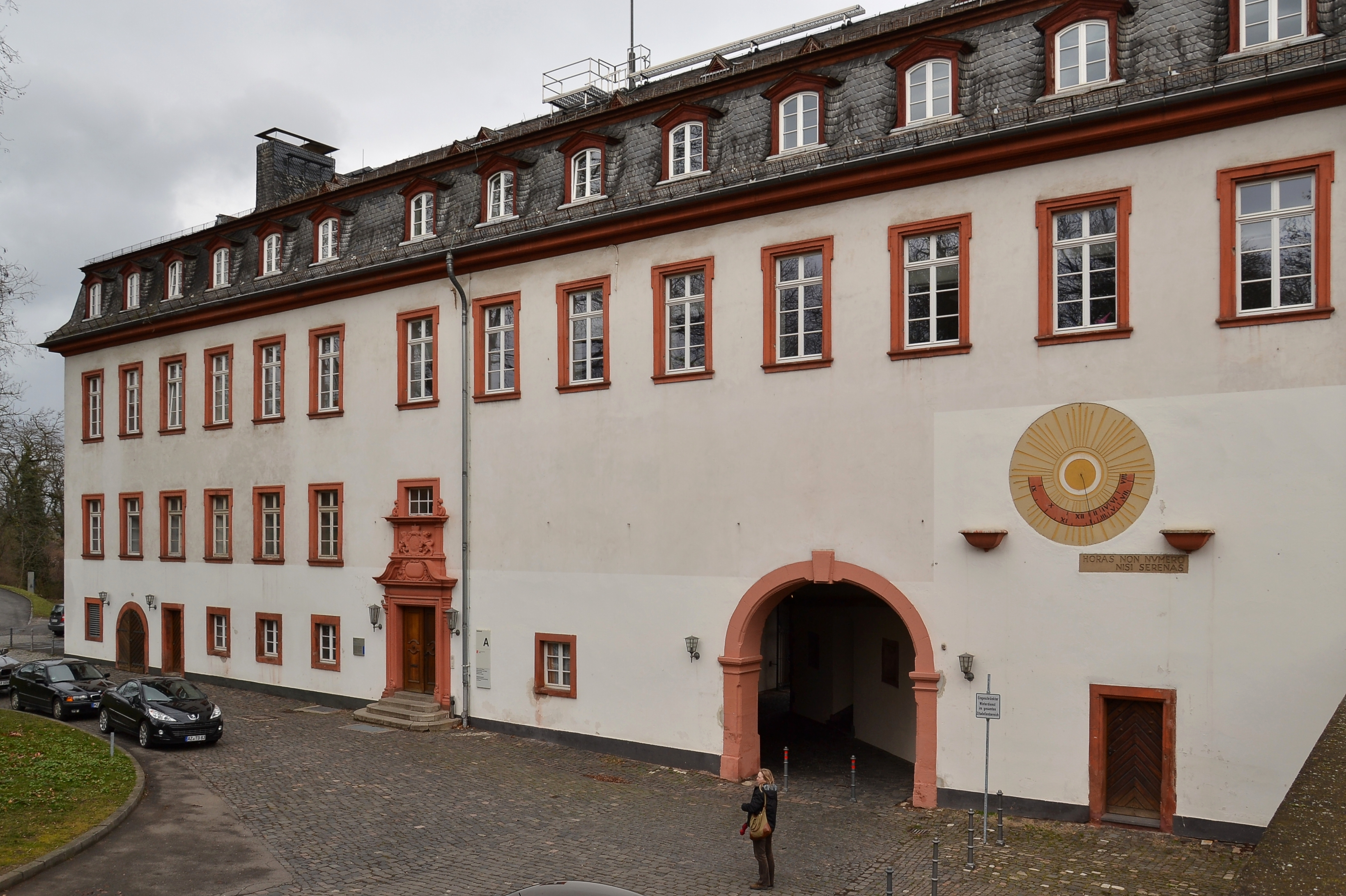
Kommandantenbau

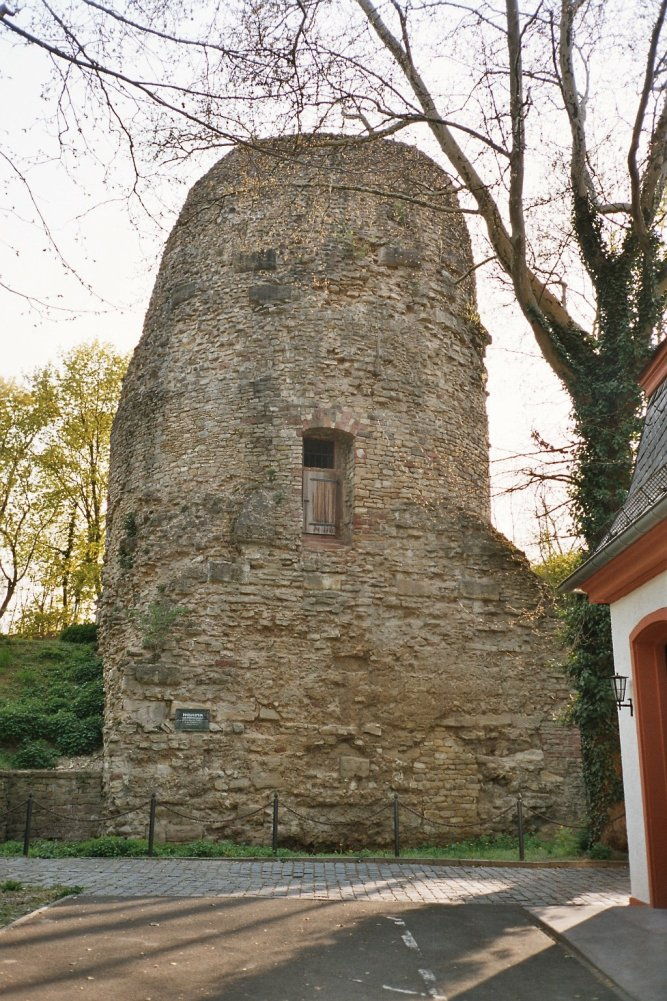
The Roman Drususstein Monument on Bastion Drusus

The Mainzer Zitadelle (Citadel of Mainz) is situated at the fringe of Mainz Old Town, near Mainz Römisches Theater station. The fortress was constructed in 1660 and was an important part of the Fortress Mainz.

== History ==
The Jakobsberg hill, where the citadel was constructed, had been occupied by a Benedictine abbey during the Middle Ages (since 1050). Halfway up the hill, the amphitheater of the Roman settlement of Mogontiacum, must also have been visible at that time. The Jakobsberg hill, however, had not been integrated in the ring of the defensive city walls of the town and this flank of the city was therefore only slightly protected. This position immediately at the gates of the town opened a strategic gap, as an aggressor could use the hill for a raid into Mainz or for a cannonade. The construction of the "Schweickhardtsburg" fortress under the supervision of cathedral vicar Adolph von Waldenburg during the years 1620-29 provisionally filled this gap and integrated the hill into the system of city walls. The name of the irregularly pentagonal fortification honors the reigning monarch of that time, the prince-elector Johann Schweikhard von Kronberg.

Around 1655 prince-elector Johann Philipp von Schönborn initiated an improvement of the fortification of the entire town comprising bastions according to French type. Within this modification of the fortress, the Schweickhardtsburg was converted into the regular, quadrangular citadel, as it is today. St. Jacobs abbey and the Roman cenotaph, the Drususstein, remained untouched within the fortress.

Above the gate in direction to the town, a building for the commander of the citadel was erected in 1696 by the order of Lothar Franz von Schönborn. The gateway, existing since 1660 was skillfully integrated in the new building.

During the siege of Mainz (1793) St. Jacobs abbey was destroyed largely by Prussian shelling. The remainings of the abbots and guest house had been used only for military purposes since then. In the south of the courtyard a Baroque garden existed, which can be seen on a map dated 1804.

After the Napoleonic Wars Mainz became in 1816 a fortress of the German Confederation. Prussians and Austrians settled in the citadel and used it as barracks. For this purpose, the Austrians erected 1861 the shellproof Citadel Barracks; the small side building was used as casino and kitchen.

Even in 1914 a double company barracks was erected. Due to this, the last remainings of the abbey declined. However numerous architectural elements of the abbot and guest houses had been integrated in the new buildings. During World War I and World War II the citadel was used as prisoner-of-war camp (Oflag XII-B).

According to the Treaty of Versailles in 1919 - and the slighting of the fortifications in and around Mainz as effect of it- the military history of the citadel of Mainz ended. Nevertheless, during the last days of World War II, the population of Mainz took shelter in the casemates of bastion Drusus, which had been turned into air raid shelters.

== After World War II ==
After the Second World War the French army seized the premises until 1955. The Paul Tirard School, named after the chair of the Inter-Allied Rhineland High Commission (1919–1930), was opened by the French administration in 1950 for education of the children of French military and civilian personnel civil during the occupation.

== The citadel today ==
Today the citadel is owned by the city of Mainz and accommodates numerous municipal offices. Mainz Citadel has been administered as part of the city's cultural heritage since 1907. The trench in the southern part of the citadel had been considered part of the city's natural heritage since the 1980s. One of the buildings near the Drususstein today houses the Mainz historical museum.

The citadel and its surroundings bear witness to the entire history of Mainz concentrated in one spot, going from the Roman cenotaph, the Drususstein (Drusus monument) via the fortress barracks and up to the World War II air raid shelters.

Since 1975, an annual youth festival, the Open-Ohr festival, has taken place at the citadel during Pentecost weekend.

== See also ==
- List of forts
- Petersberg Citadel
- Salomon Gluck

== External links (de) ==
- www.festung-mainz.de/zitadelle
- Initiative Zitadelle Mainz e.V.
- Stadthistorisches Museum auf der Zitadelle
