= Schierstein Bridge =

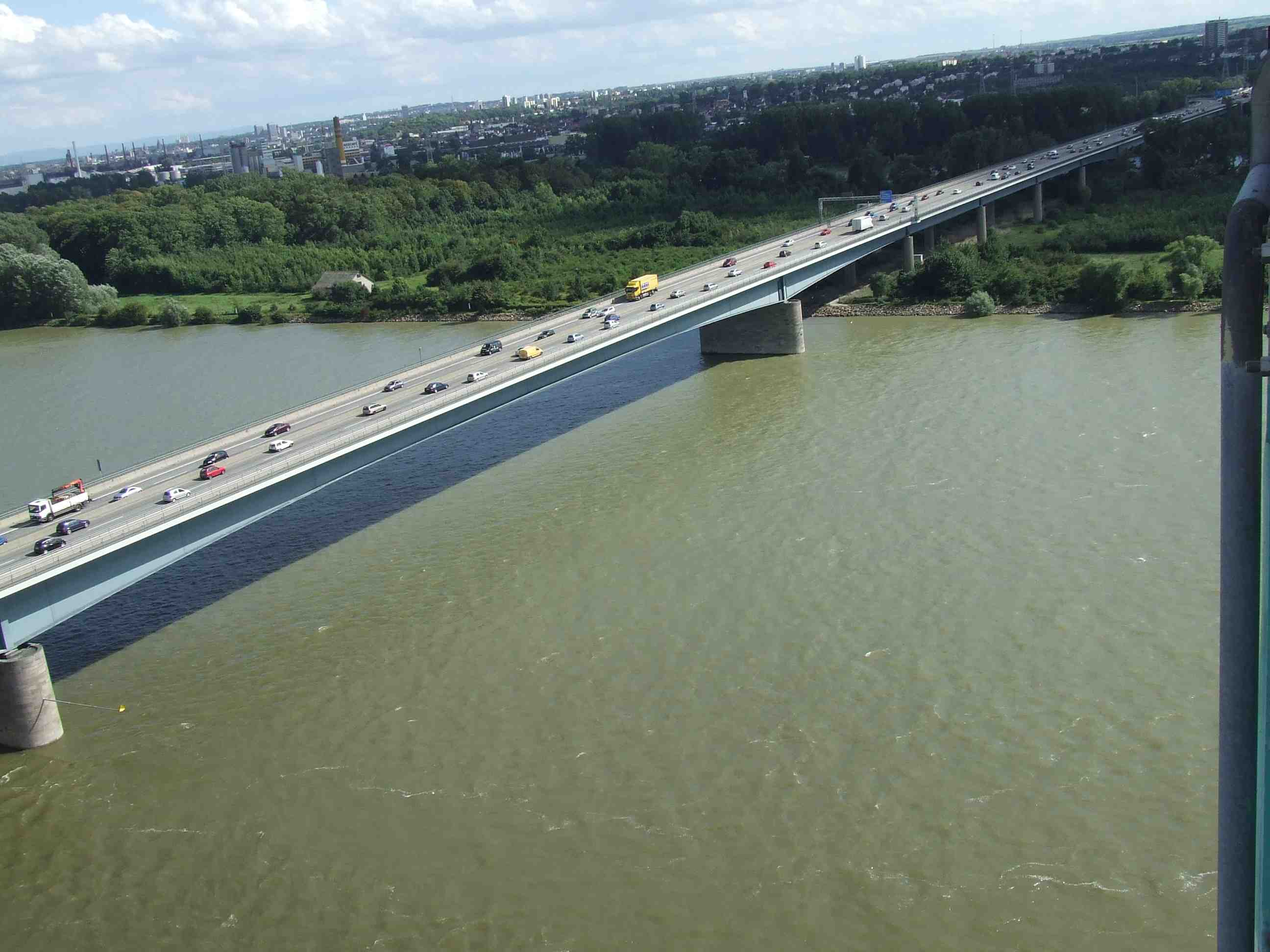
- Coordinates: 50°2′12″N 8°12′44″E
- Carries: Bundesautobahn 643
- Crosses: Rhine River
- Locale: Mainz-Mombach, Rhineland-Palatinate and Wiesbaden-Schierstein, Hesse, Germany
- Official name: Schiersteiner Brücke
- Maintained by: Hessisches Landesamt für Straßen- und Verkehrswesen (Hesse Department of Roads and Transportation)

Characteristics
- Material: Prestressed concrete, composite, and steel
- Total length: 1,282 m (4,206 ft)
- Width: 26 m (85 ft)
- Longest span: 205 m (673 ft)
- No. of spans: 6

History
- Designer: Leonhardt und Andrä
- Construction start: 1959
- Construction end: 1962
- Closed: 2015

Statistics
- Daily traffic: 80,000

Location
- Interactive map of Schierstein Bridge

The Schierstein Bridge (German: Schiersteiner Brücke) is 1,282-meter (4,206 ft) long, four-lane highway bridge in Germany. It carries Bundesautobahn 643 over the Rhine River between Mainz-Mombach, Rhineland-Palatinate and Wiesbaden-Schierstein, Hesse (Rhine kilometrage 504.45). Crossing two arms of the Rhine and the intervening island of Rettbergsaue, the bridge is made of six individual structures, including 100 m (330 ft) from prestressed concrete. It was built between 1959 and 1962.

The Schierstein Bridge is located about 5.8 km (3.6 mi) downstream of the Theodor Heuss Bridge. Together with the Theodor Heuss Bridge and the A 60 bridge, it is one of three road bridges across the Rhine at Mainz. It is the last bridge over the Middle Rhine for 80 kilometers (50 mi) downstream, before the Südbrücke in Koblenz.

From mid-February to mid-April 2015 the bridge was closed from all traffic due to extensive structural damage.

== History ==
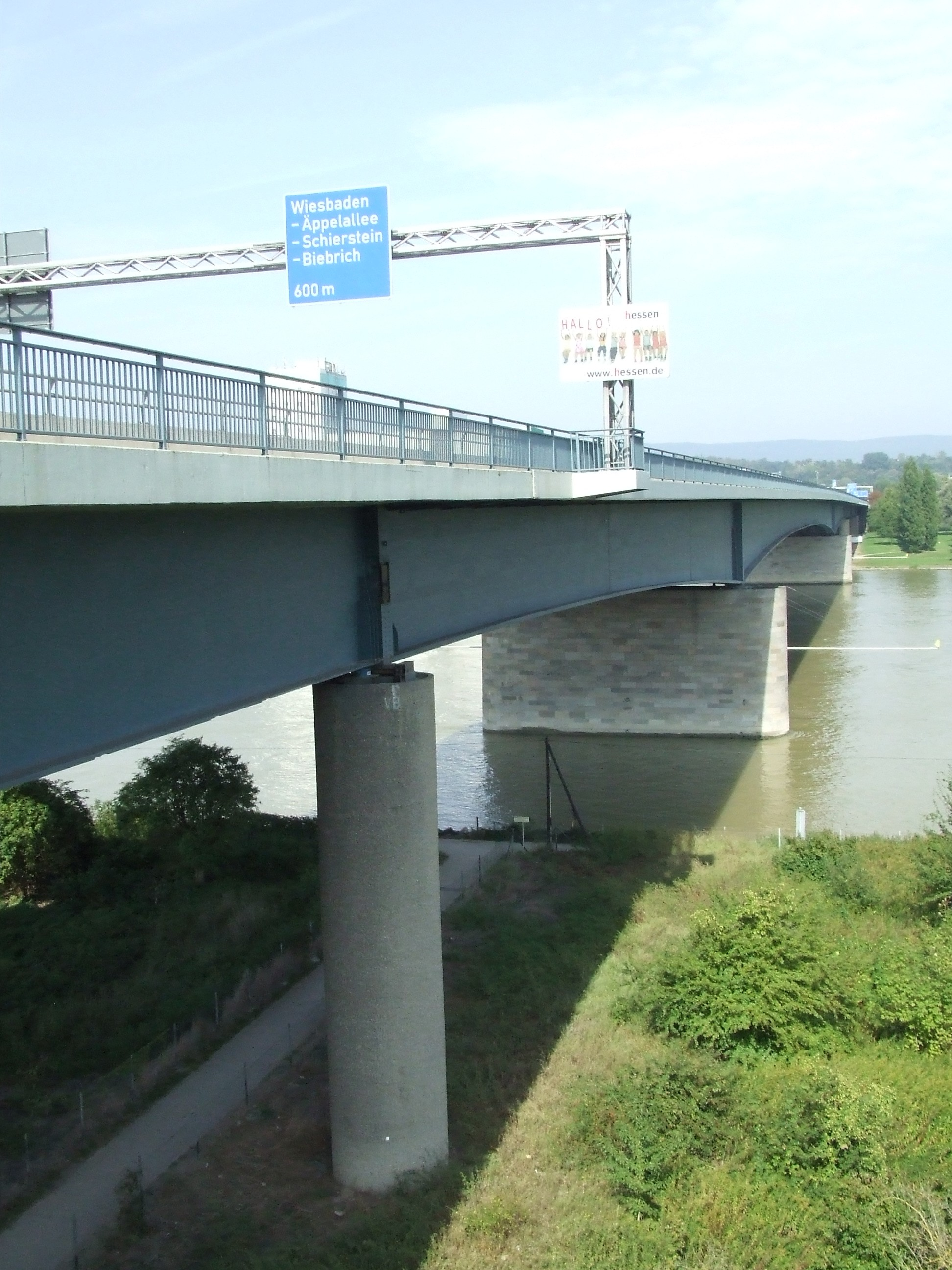
View from Rettbergsaue Island in the direction of Wiesbaden

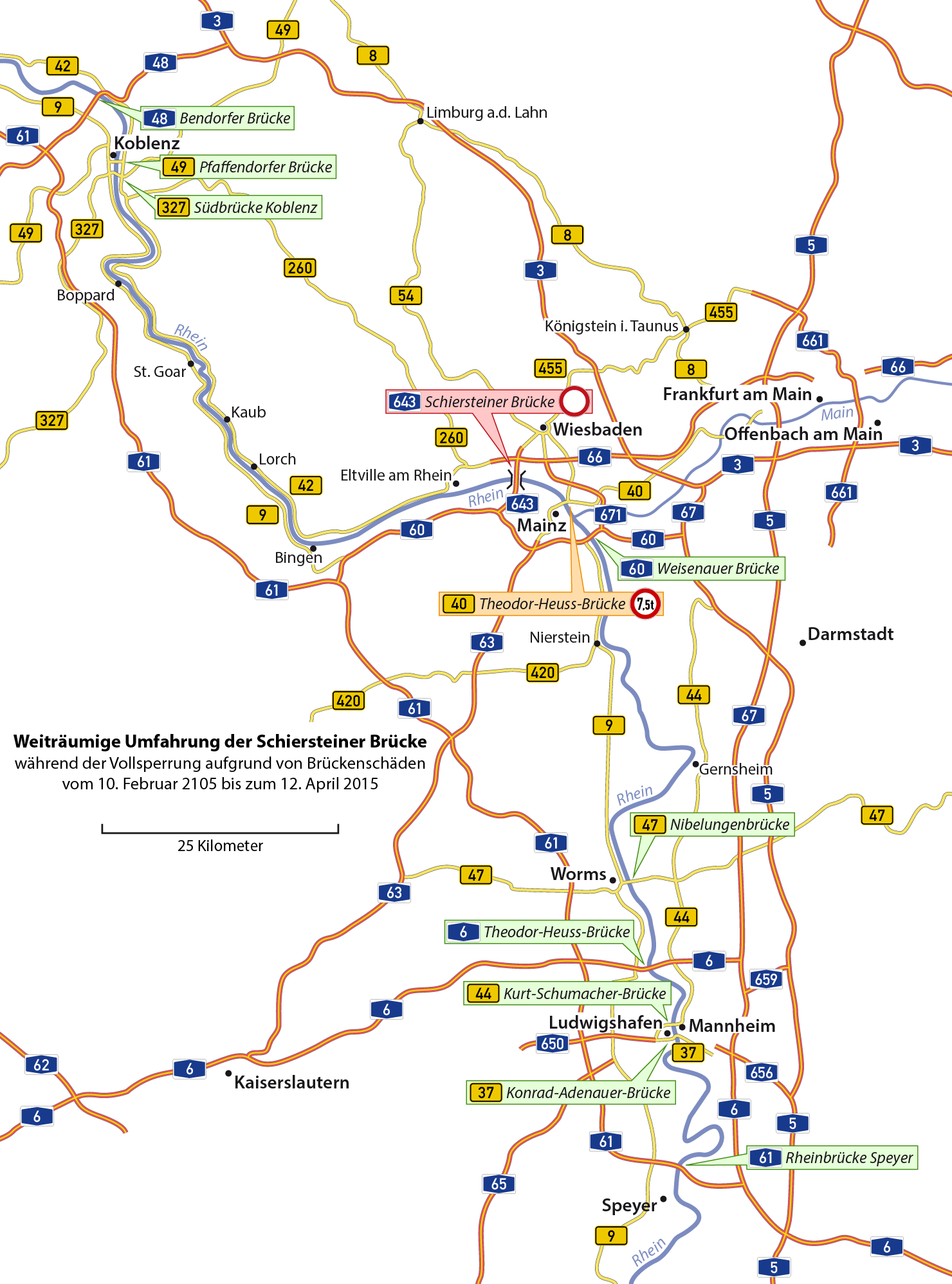
Situation of the bridge in the German road network

At the end of the 1950s and early 1960s, the states of Hesse and Rhineland-Palatinate began an extensive road construction program to further the development of the Rhine-Main Region. Planners recognized a need for a connection between the former Rhine-Main Expressway (Rhein-Main Schnellweg, now Bundesautobahn 66) on the right bank and Bundesstraße 9 (now Landstraße 419) on the left bank through a crossing of the Rhine north of Mainz. The bridge was also necessary to create a traffic ring in the Mainz-Wiesbaden area to better handle traffic coming from Frankfurt and Darmstadt. This ring, consisting of the A 643, A 66, A 671 and A 60, also included a second Rhine bridge south of Mainz.

The selected route of the Schierstein Bridge required the crossing of five specific areas: the Schierstein floodplain, the Schierstein arm of the Rhine, Rettbergsaue Island, the Mombach arm of the Rhine, and the Mombach floodplain. The designers wanted to create one bridge with a uniform aesthetic design in spite of the diversity of different spans required to be constructed.

In response to a free invitation, three designs were submitted to the official authorities. The designs included a steel construction with a lightweight steel deck, a composite concrete and steel construction, and a pre-stressed concrete design. Detailed investigations of the submissions showed the best solution was a combination of the three variants.

The production of sub-units of the superstructure and their assembly into larger units were made in large part in the workshop. Large on-site cranes were then used to place them and their assembly was successfully completed. The entire steel structure was delivered to the site by water from Düsseldorf on a rented boat and installed.

== General description ==
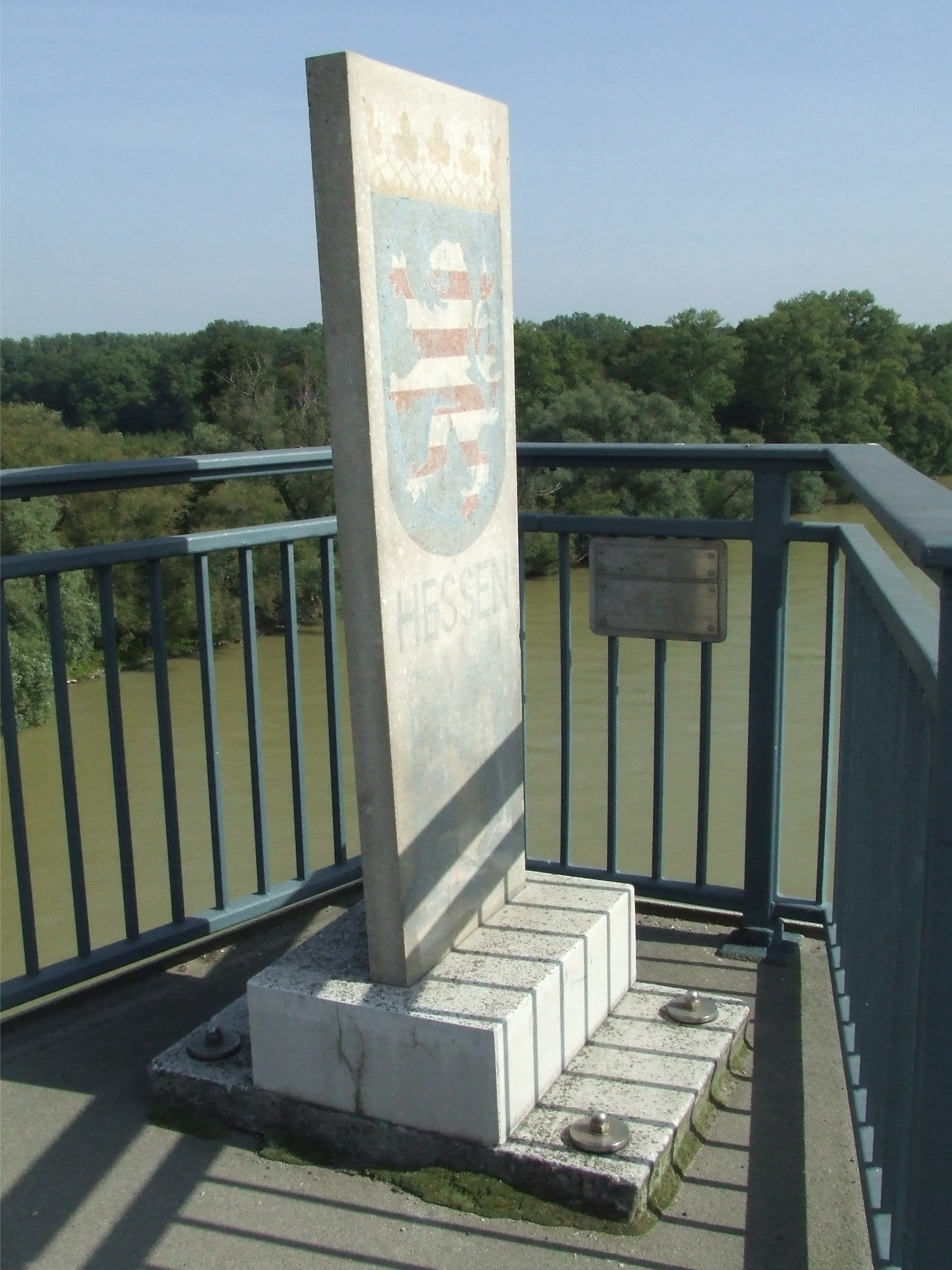
Monument marking the border between Rhineland-Palatinate and Hessen

The Schierstein Bridge begins shortly after the Wiesbaden-Äppelallee interchange on the Hessian side of the Rhine. In order to deal with the elevation differential between the two sides of the river, the abutment on the Rhineland-Palatinate side was situated at the level of the highest terrace in Gonsenheim (near the Mainz Sand Dunes nature reserve), about one kilometer beyond the Mainz-Mombach interchange. This required an elevated bridge structure (the Hochstraße Lenneberg), with 31 piers, spanning the Mombach floodplain.

This also means that the Mombach interchange is one of the few that lie on a bridge. The bridge was originally designed to accommodate a highway to be built through the interchange, so very short acceleration and deceleration lanes were built there. Several street lights were installed to illuminate the junction, but, for cost reasons, these remain dark today. Also, two traffic control systems at the Mombach interchange have been out of operation since the late 1980s.

The bridge was built in the 1950s with a design capacity of 23,000 vehicles per day. At the time of planning, about 7,100 vehicles per day were expected to actually use it. Today, the design capacity is regularly exceeded by a factor of 3, which in turn led to extensive damage to the reinforced concrete structure.

In addition, the bridge between the Mombach and Gonsenheim interchanges has no hard shoulder. With about 80,000 vehicles using the bridge per day, a traffic accident or car breakdown inevitably leads to immediate traffic jams.

The Schierstein Bridge has a total (railing to railing) width of 25.50 m (83.7 ft) and a road width of 20 m (66 ft). The cross-section includes two traffic lanes, an emergency lane, and a combined bike- and walkway on each side. Two spiral staircases allow access for pedestrians and cyclists on the left and right side of the bridge, directly over the summer dam of the Rhine. There is also a staircase to the Rettbergsaue in the center of the river on the upstream (east) side of the bridge.

An impressive landmark on the deck of the bridge marks where the bridge crosses the middle of the left arm of Rhine - the border between Rhineland-Palatinate and Hesse. The monument, with the coat of arms of both states, was produced by Raimund Eser in 1961. It was donated by the William Dyckerhoff Institute of Wiesbaden.

== Technical data ==
The Schierstein Bridge consists of six individual bridges.

- From the south end, the first structure spans the Mainz-Mombach floodplain. It is a composite steel bridge with two spans with lengths of 46.4 m and 52.2 m, for a total length of 98.6 m. It is composed of longitudinal plate girders and crosswise trusses with a prestressed-concrete bridge deck.
- The next structure is the small river bridge, spanning the left arm of the Rhine. It is an arched steel bridge with three spans of 70 m, 170 m, and 70 m, for a total length of 310 m. It has an orthotropic steel bridge deck supported by haunched longitudinal plate girders and crosswise trusses.
- Structure 3 is the Rettbergsaue Island bridge, with three spans of 70 m each, for a total length of 210 m. It is composed of constant-height longitudinal plate girders and crosswise trusses with a prestressed-concrete bridge deck.
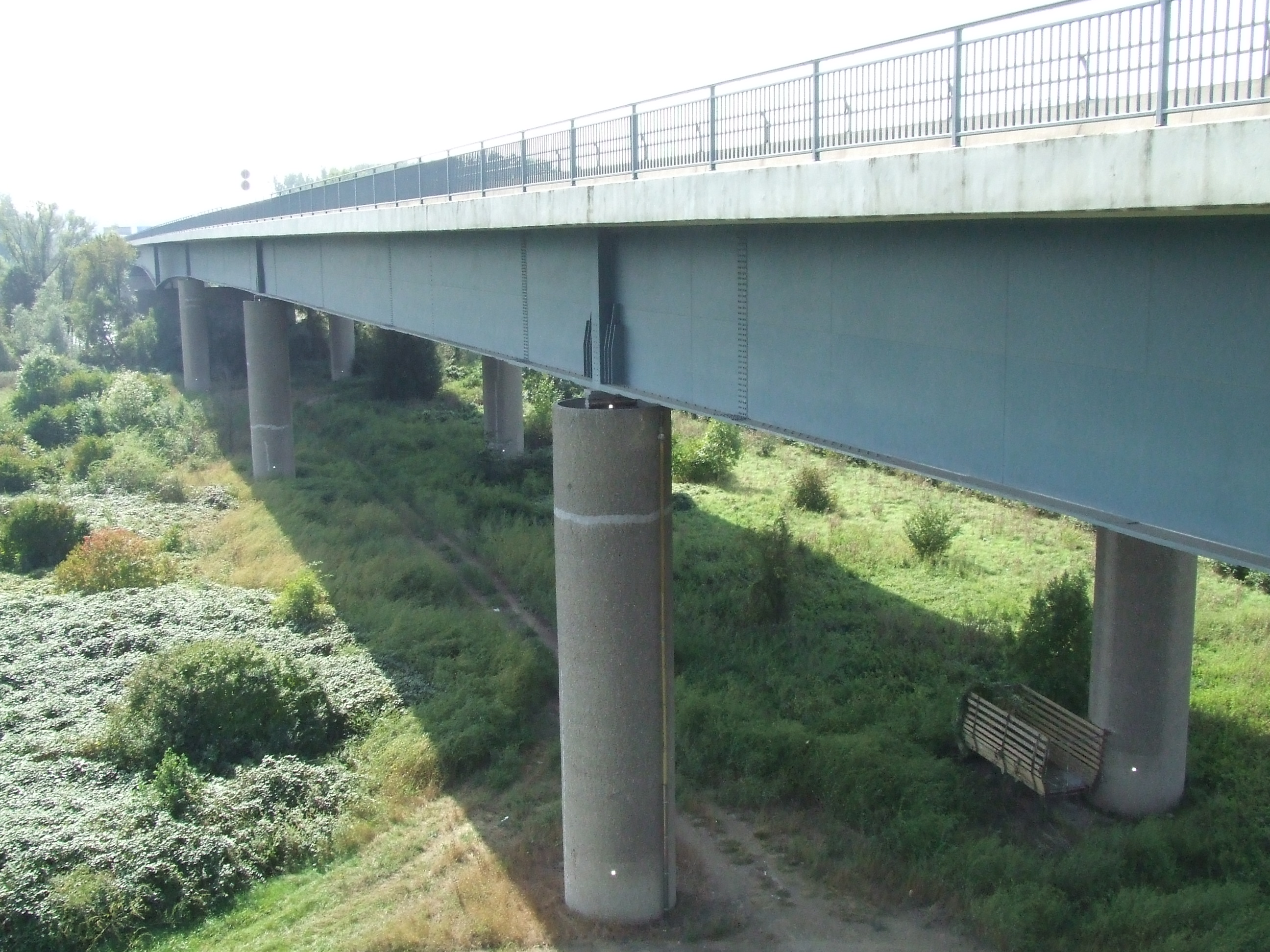
  View of the bridge over Rettbergsaue Island in the direction of Mainz
- The fourth structure is the large river bridge, spanning the left arm of the Rhine. It is a steel bridge with an orthotropic steel bridge deck supported by haunched longitudinal plate girders and crosswise trusses. Its cross-section is identical to that of the small river bridge. It has three spans of 85 m, 205 m, and 85 m for a total length of 375 m. The 205-m span is the largest of the entire Schierstein Bridge.
- Structure 5 is the bridge spanning the Schierstein floodplain. It is composite bridge with a constant height and a composition like that of Structures 1 and 3. It has three spans of approximately 70 m, 60 m, and 55 m, for a total length of 185 m.
- After a 4.39-meter wide pillar separating Structures 5 and 6, comes finally a prestressed concrete box-girder bridge with 3 spans of 32.88 m each, for a total length of 98.64 m. The deck is also preloaded in the transverse direction.

All six structures have a common deck for both carriageways. Structures 1 and 2, and Structures 3 through 5, are longitudinally coupled.

The abutments and land supports were built as single columns with a circular cross-section and founded on footings. The river piers have a rounded rectangular cross-section and were founded on caissons.

== Jurisdiction ==
Since most of the Schiersteiner Bridge is in Hesse, and the smaller part in Rhineland-Palatinate, it was decided through arrangements between the two states that the Hessian administration would alone be responsible for its maintenance. Similarly, the Rhineland-Palatinate agency is solely responsible for the Weisenauer Bridge (A 60). This is also confirmed by the respective names of the bridges: Schierstein is a borough of Wiesbaden and Weisenau part of Mainz.

== Renovation ==
Over the years, the bridge has had to handle an ever-increasing traffic load, but, with the exception of re-painting, conservation measures were not carried out. In 1995, testing indicated that there had been extensive damage to the bridge, primarily from corrosion. It was concentrated mainly the areas of transition between structures and expansion joints, where water was able to infiltrate. Surface cracks and damaged areas of the deck sealing also allowed localized high chloride stress in the concrete. Although the viability and stability of the bridge were only partially affected, urgent repairs were needed to ensure its continued usability and durability.

These were carried out between 1997 and 2000 at a cost of 21 million euros. The repair work was carried out in three stages. In Stage 1, the entire deck sealing, pavement, and walking/cycling paths were completely renewed. The areas of the road surface with chloride damage were removed. The upper 4 to 6 cm of the surface was replaced and a new waterproofing system installed. Subsequently, an asphalt surface was laid.

In the second stage, the bearings of Structures 1 through 5 were repaired. The heavily polluted roller bearings were completely replaced. The needle bearings (compact roller bearings) were opened and cleaned and the abrasive contact surfaces were reground. The bearings were then greased and closed again.

In the third stage, the sidewalks in the steel bridge area were replaced. Also the existing 1.00 m high aluminum railings without ropes were replaced with 1.20 m high steel railings with ropes in order to satisfy current safety codes. The old rubber seals on the expansion joints were also replaced.

== Continuing maintenance problems ==
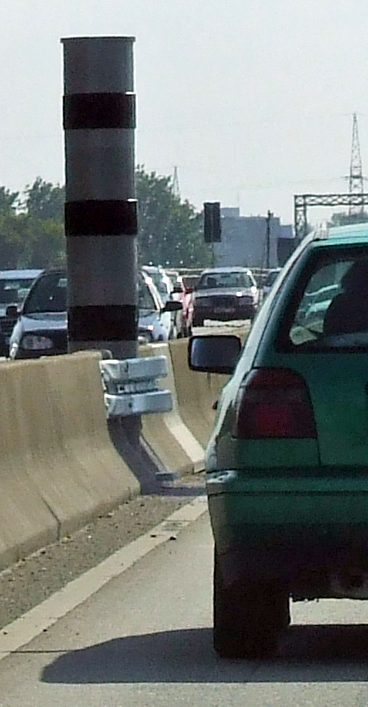
Traffic control cameras on Schierstein Bridge

A report in 2006 concluded that the bridge was no longer be repairable and could only be used until 2015. It also recommended that the bridge be inspected on a quarterly basis (normally bridges in Germany undergo a simple review every three years and a major review every six years). A replacement for the Schiersteiner bridge is being planned.

Because of the poor condition of the structure, the speed limit was reduced from 100 km/h to 80 km/h in late 2006 to reduce vibrations on the bridge. In spring 2007, it was again lowered to 60 km/h, between the Mombach and Äppelallee interchanges. Since that time, the same speed limit has been applied to the entire bridge. Since September 19, 2008, the speed limit is monitored by a fixed speed cameras on the southbound side and by frequent mobile radar stations on the other.

On February 10, 2015 the bridge was closed from all traffic until further notice after a supporting pillar had been found to have developed a tilt leaving a portion of the bridge hanging without adequate support.

The bridge was reopened for cars up to 3.5 tons on May 25, 2015. The speed limit was further reduced to 40 km/h. Since the November 7th 2015 even lorries up to 40t can use the bridge again.

== See also ==
- List of bridges in Germany
