= Rettbergsaue =

Island in the Rhine River at Wiesbaden, Germany

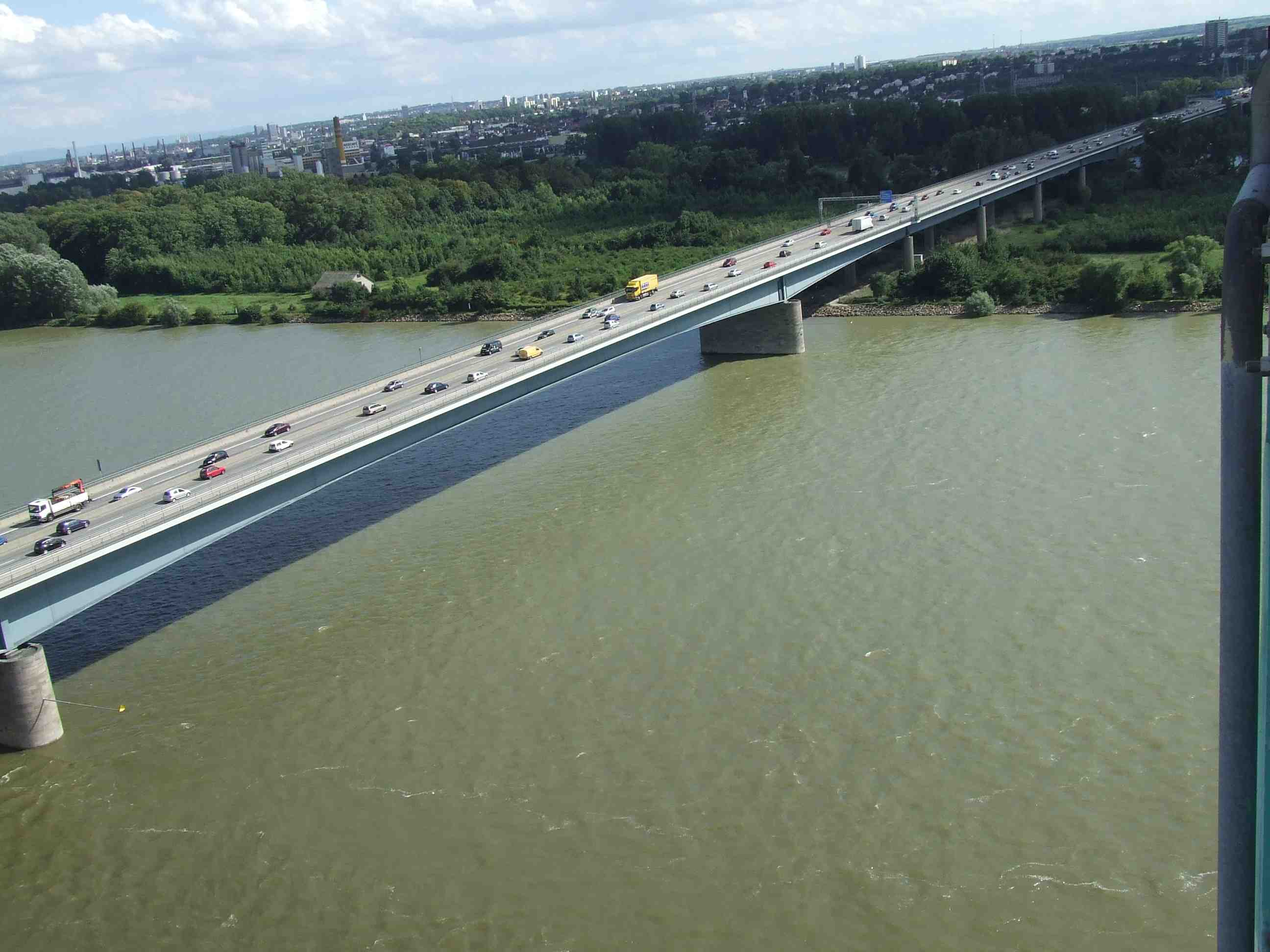
- The Schierstein Bridge with the Rettbergsaue
- Interactive map of Rettbergsaue

Geography
- Location: Rhine River
- Coordinates: 50°2′4″N 8°13′16″E
- Area: 68 ha (170 acres)
- Length: 3,100 m (10200 ft)
- Width: 400 m (1300 ft)

Administration
- Germany
- Land: Hesse
- City: Wiesbaden
- Borough: Biebrich and Schierstein

The Rettbergsaue (translated from German as “Rettberg Island”) is a natural island in the Rhine River at Wiesbaden, Germany. It is situated between the main channel of the Rhine to the north and a smaller channel, the Wachsbleicharm, in the south. The Wachsbleicharm forms the border between the federal states of Hesse (of which Wiesbaden is the capital) and Rhineland-Palatinate.

The island is about 3,100 meters (10,200 ft) long and up to 400 m (1,300 ft) wide. Covering about 68 hectares (170 acres), it is one of the largest islands on the Rhine in which the river flows unhindered on both sides. The island is for the most part covered with trees and has a rich bird and plant life. Approximately 90% of the island is protected, with the remainder used for recreational and agricultural purposes.

Bundesautobahn 643 crosses the Rhine via the Rettbergsaue on the Schierstein Bridge. Although there is a sidewalk on both sides of the road on the bridge, only the sidewalk on the east side has stairs to access the island.

The majority of the island, lying opposite Biebrich Castle, is within the borough of Wiesbaden-Biebrich. The part west of the Schierstein Bridge is part of Wiesbaden-Schierstein.

== History ==
The Rettbergsaue was originally two islands, created through deposition of coarse sediments and flood silts. The eastern island was the Biebricher Wörth and the western island the Schiersteiner Wörth. The two islands grew together after port construction along this section of the Rhine in the mid-19th century. Evidence of human settlement dates to the Middle Ages, and probably to Roman times, based on structural remnants found at two sites at the highest elevations of the island.

The western part, which had been named Karthäuser Island in the Late Middle Ages, acquired the name of Rettbergsaue in 1832 from the Baron (German Freiherr) Carl von Rettberg. The lieutenant and adjutant of the Duke of Nassau purchased the island from the Nassau government for approximately 1,125 guilders and operated a cattle and horse breeding business there. For financial reasons, he returned possession of the island to Nassau only a few years later for 50,000 guilders.

== Recreational areas ==
In 1914, Schierstein Beach was established on the western end, close to two old channels of the Rhine. Biebrich Beach was established on the northern shore in 1921. Because of heavy pollution of the Rhine, both beaches were closed in 1962.

Today, the former Schierstein and Biebrich Beaches serve as recreation areas, with large playgrounds, barbecue area, several table-tennis tables, playing areas for badminton and basketball, soccer fields with goalposts, and other attractions. The Schierstein recreation area has the Island Café (Insel-Café), while Biebrich also offers areas for floor chess and volleyball and an open-air bowling alley. The island is popular with camping enthusiasts and the white-sand beaches are once again occasionally used for swimming. Because the island is free of traffic and dogs are banned, Rettbergsaue is an especially popular recreation area for families with children.

The two recreation grounds are accessible from the staircase of the Schiersteiner Bridge. In the summer, the island is also served by the passenger ferry Tamara, which operates between the beaches and the Schierstein Port and a river landing in Wiesbaden-Biebrich. The rest of the island is inaccessible to visitors.

== Rettbergsaue Nature Reserve ==
The Rettbergsaue Nature Reserve covers about 90 percent of the island. It has high importance as a wooded barrier between the two cities, acting as a climatic compensation area and emission filter in the metropolitan area.

The island lies within the course of the Rhine and contains a variety of biotopes including softwood and hardwood forest; brush border, island meadow, foredune, shore, floodlawn, and accretionary habitats. The native species are threatened by invasive species (like the horse chestnut and tree of heaven), hybrid poplars, over-grazing, damage from canoeists, the spread of the Alexandrine parakeet (from Biebrich Castle), and elm disease. Factories outside the island also have an effect on the vegetation.

The goals of the nature reserve are the preservation and development of the existing island forests, replacement of poplar plantations with native species, and promoting the growth of disease-resistant elms.

=== Biotope complexes (habitat classes) ===
- Wet grassland complexes on mineral soils — 43%
- Deciduous forest complexes (up to 30% share of conifers) — 47%
- Hardwood forest cultures (foreign to the site or exotic trees) — "Artistic Forestry" — 10%

=== Habitat types according to the European Union Habitats Directive ===
- 6430 — Hydrophilous riparian tall herb fringe communities of plains and of the montane to alpine levels, hydrophilous perennial borders of plains up to submountain level, 1 ha.
- 6510 — Extensively-managed lowland hay meadows with meadow foxtail (Alopecurus pratensis) and great burnet (Sanguisorba officinalis), species-rich, fresh grasslands of the plains up to submountain level, 5 ha.
- 91E0 — Alluvial forests with black alder (Alnus glutinosa) and common ash (Fraxinus excelsior), softwood (white willow, Salix alba) riparian alluvial forests with largely undisturbed flooding dynamics (regularly inundated, often for relatively long periods), 30 ha.
- 91F0 — Riparian mixed forests of pedunculate oak (Quercus robur), European white elm (Ulmus laevis) and field elm (Ulmus minor), common ash (Fraxinus excelsior) or narrow-leafed ash (Fraxinus angustifolia), along the great rivers - hardwood forest on the banks of large rivers, with largely undisturbed flooding dynamics; forests in nitrogen-rich locations usually with well-developed undergrowth, rich in trailing plants, 15 ha.

=== Species of birds observed ===
- Common kingfisher (Alcedo atthis), foraging guest, very rare (<5 individuals)
- White stork (Ciconia ciconia), foraging guest, very rare (<5)
- Middle spotted woodpecker (Dendrocopos medius), foraging guest, very rare
- Peregrine falcon (Falco peregrinus), foraging guest, present (<5)
- Red-backed shrike (Lanius collurio), breeding attested (3)
- Black kite (Milvus migrans), breeding attested (16)
- Red kite (Milvus milvus), migratory/resting (<100)
- European honey buzzard (Pernis apivorus), breeding attested (1)
- Grey-headed woodpecker (Picus canus), breeding attested (1)
- Grey heron (Ardea cinerea), breeding attested (42)
- Lesser spotted woodpecker (Dendrocopus minor), breeding attested (1)
- Nightingale (Luscinia megarhynchos), breeding attested (<30)
- Common redstart (Phoenicurus phoenicurus), breeding attested (2).
