= A643 =

A643 may refer to:

- A643 road, a road in England
- Bundesautobahn 643, a road in Germany
