= List of memorials to Edith Stein =

The following is a list of memorials to Edith Stein (Teresa Benedicta of the Cross), martyr and saint.

== Pictorial Works ==
The martyrdom of Edith Stein depicted in a stained glass work by Alois Plum in Sacred Heart Church in Kassel, Germany (1983-1984)

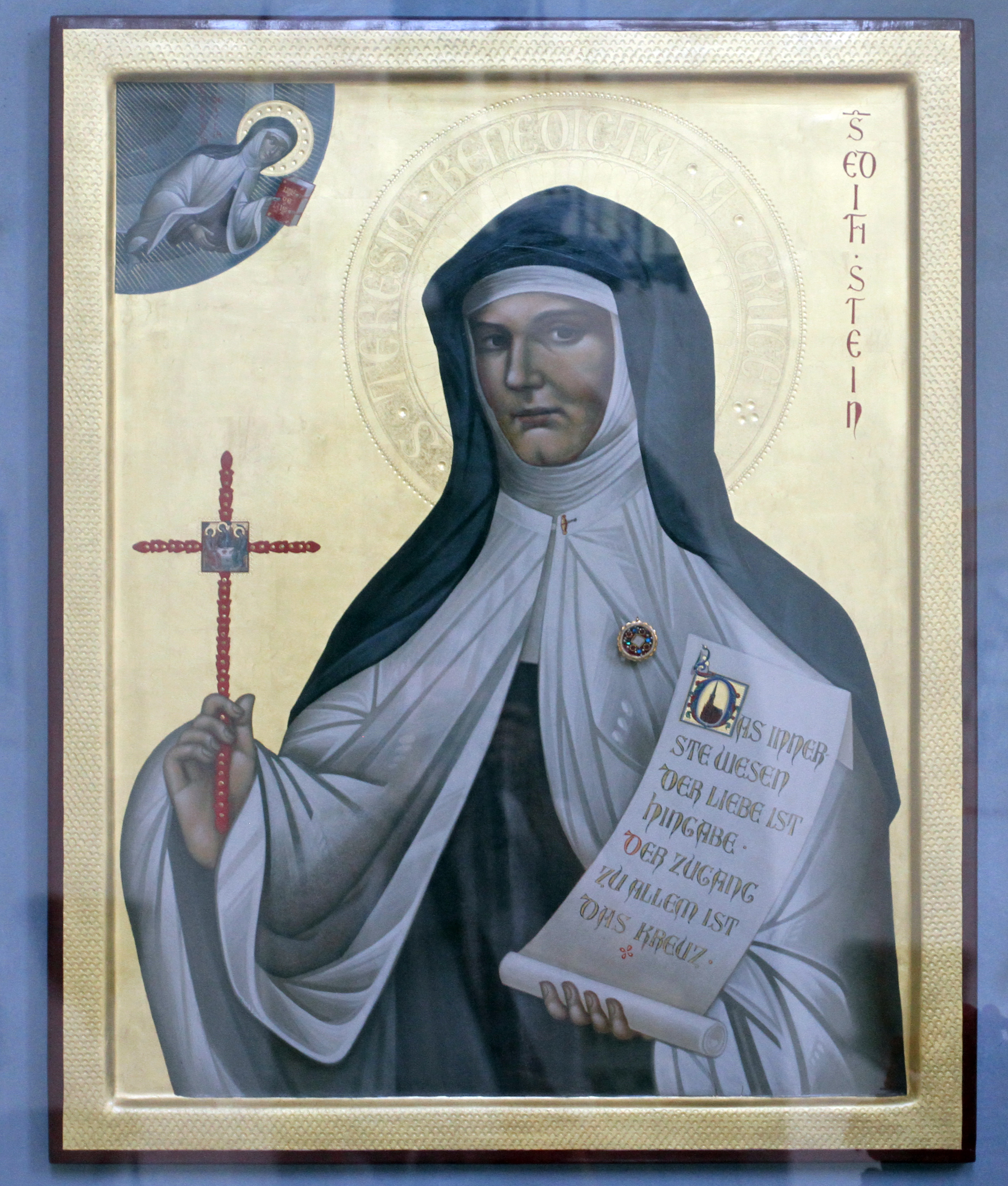
An icon in Stein's baptismal church, the Parish Church of St. Martin, in Bad Bergzabern, Germany

== Sculptures ==
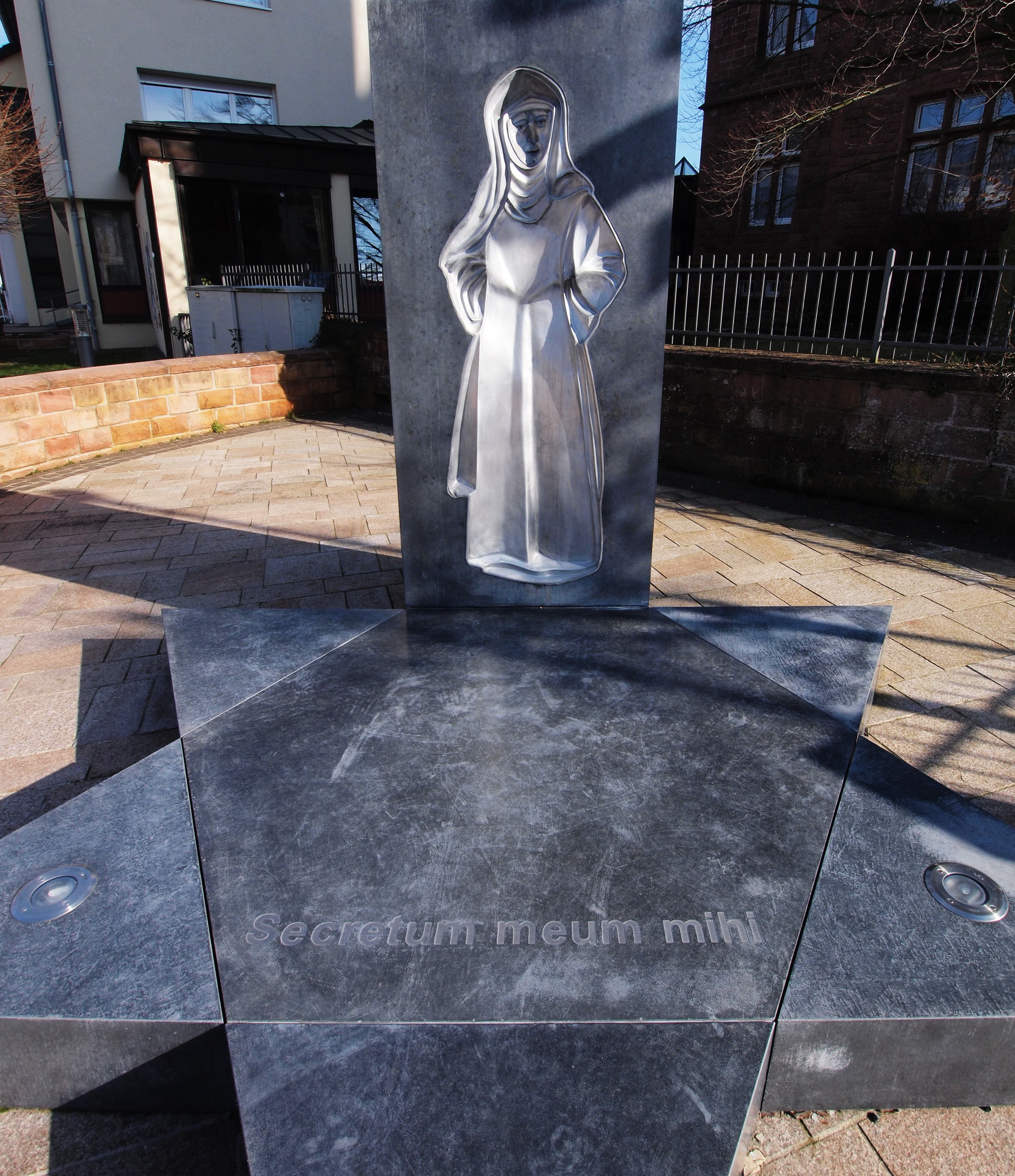
Sculpture by Daniel Moriz Lehr on the Ludwigplatz in front of Stein's baptismal church, the Parish Church of St. Martin, in Bad Bergzabern, Germany (2013)

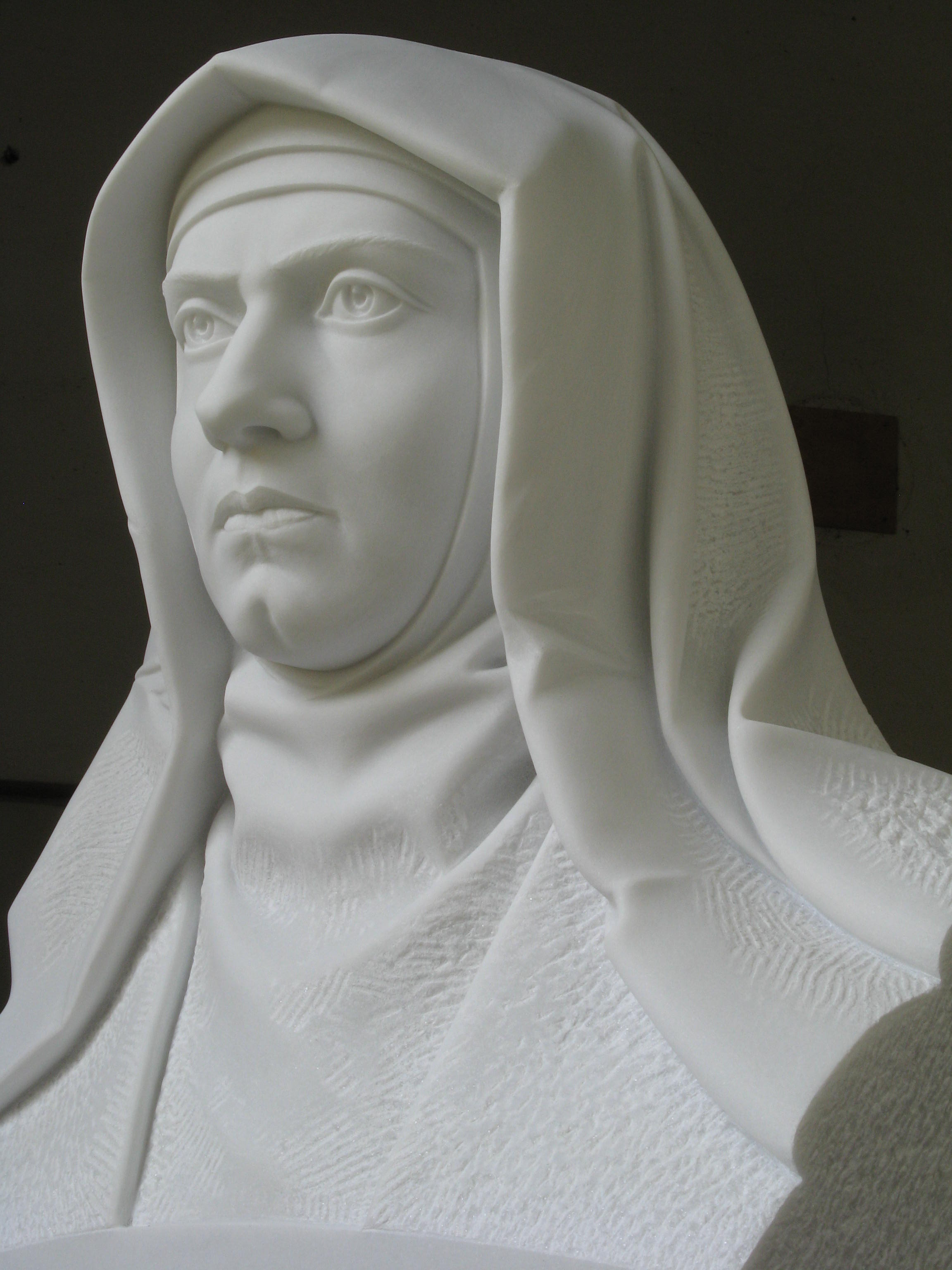
Bust by Johann Brunner at the Walhalla Memorial near Regensburg, Germany (2008)

The Edith Stein Memorial by Bert Gerresheim, a statuary group depicting different phases of Stein's life at the Börsenplatz in Cologne, Germany (1999)

== Plaques and reliefs ==
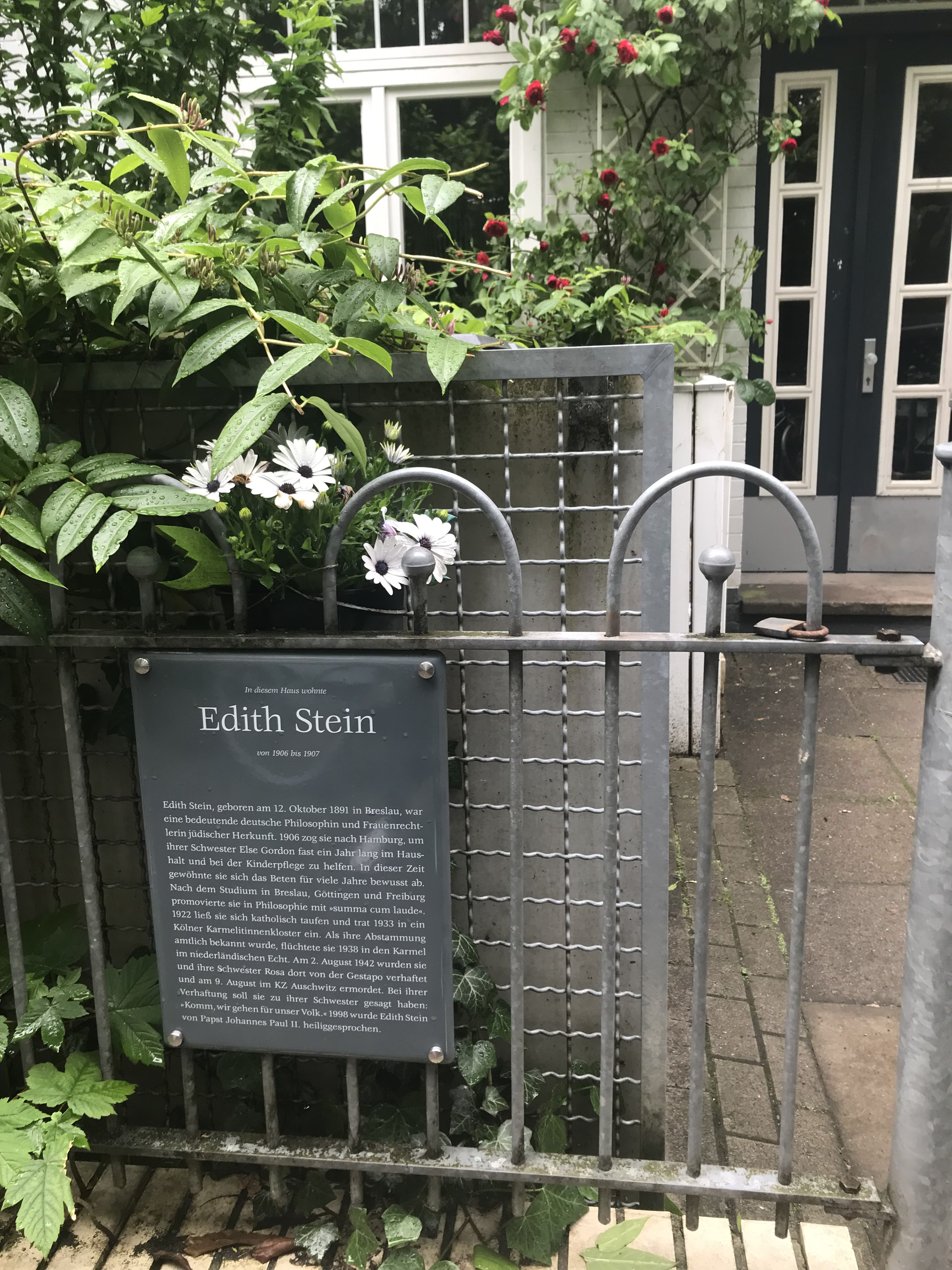
Commemorative plaque in front of a house where Edith Stein lived from 1906–1907 in Hamburg-Eppendorf

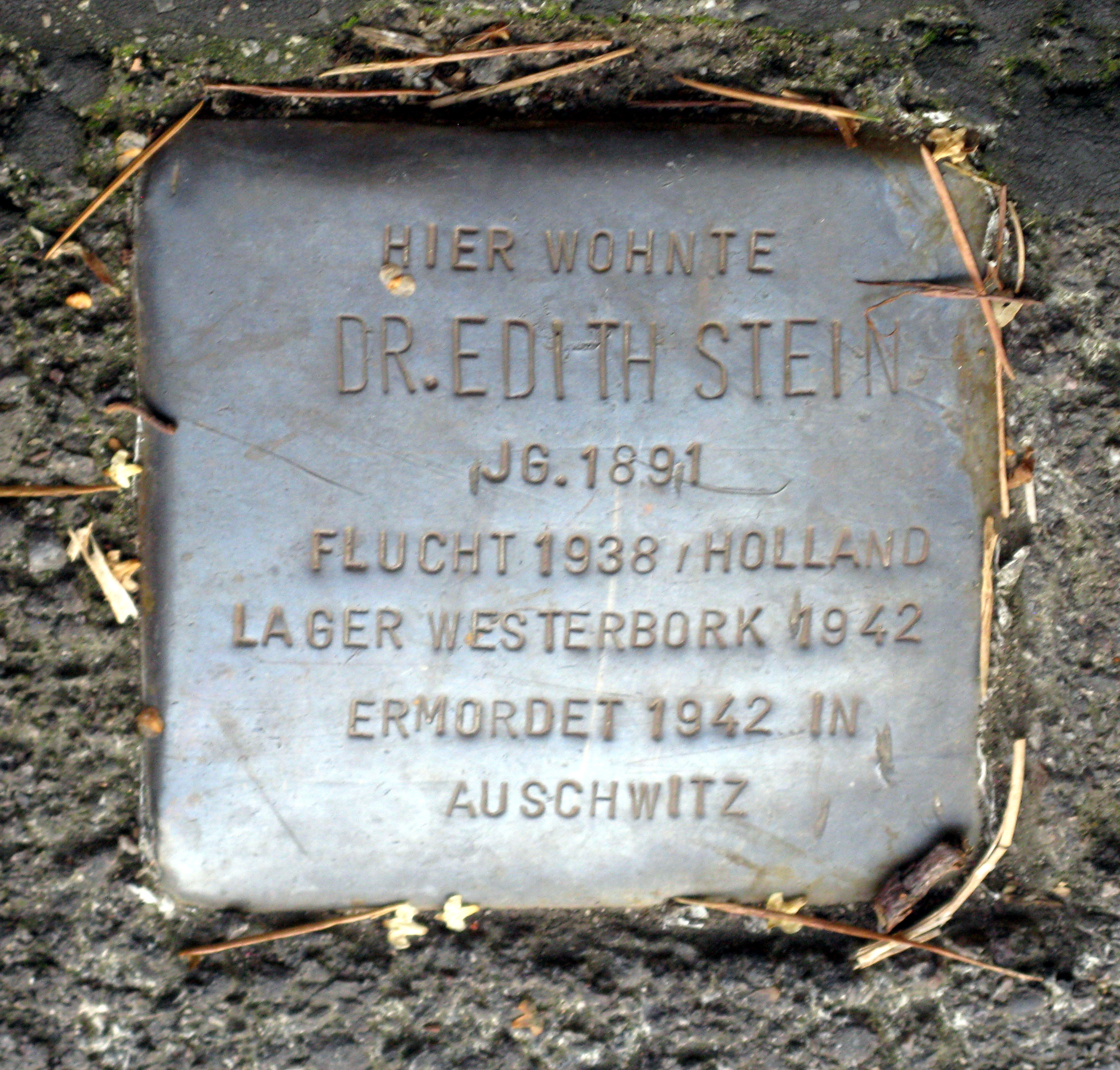
Stolperstein in Freiburg, Zasiusstraße 24. Edith Stein lived here from 1917 to 1918, during her time as assistant to Edmund Husserl

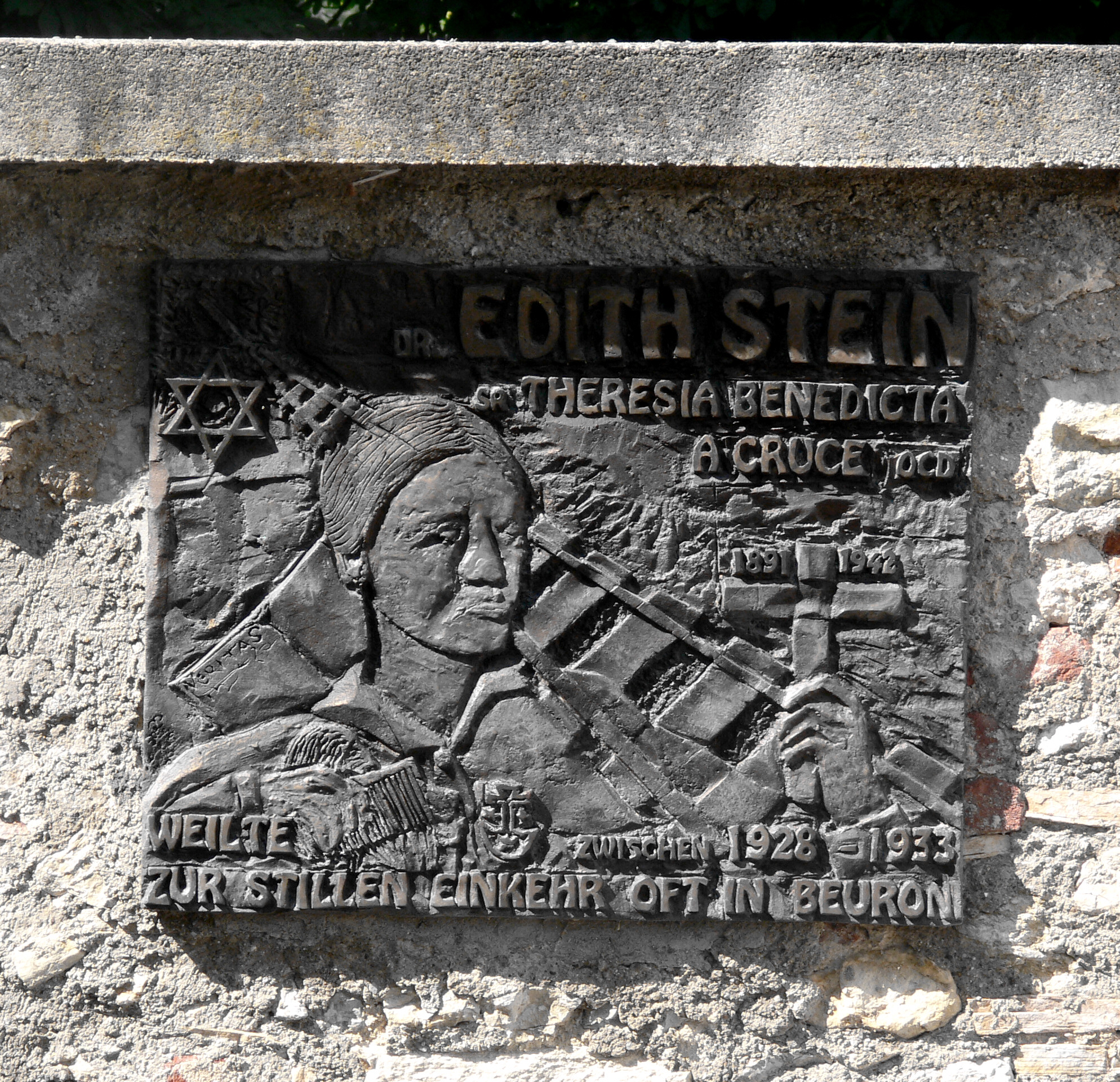
Memorial plaque at the Beuron Archabbey, "Teresa Benedicta a Cruce often stayed in Beuron for quiet contemplation between 1928 and 1933"

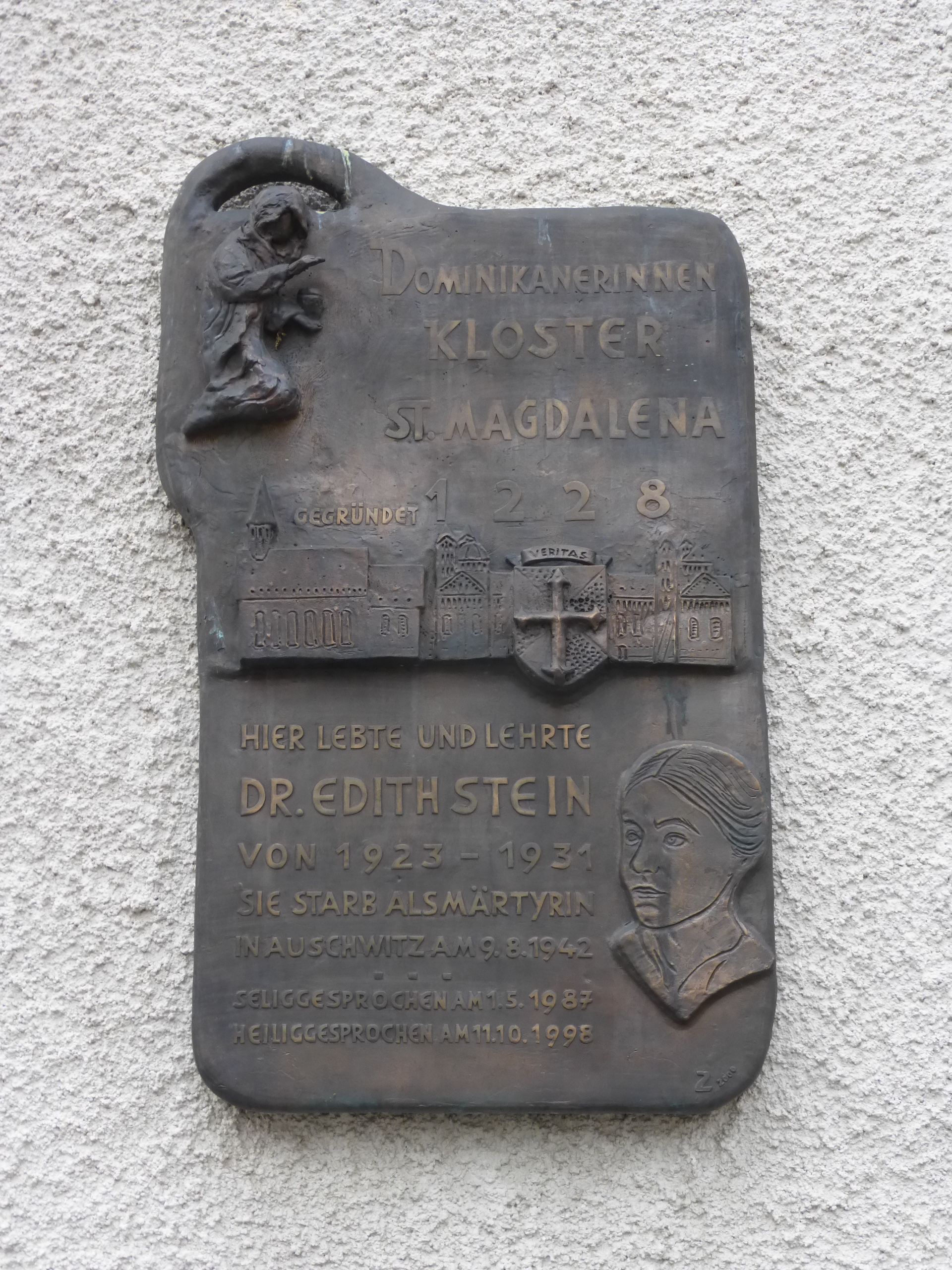
Memorial plaque at the Dominican convent St. Magdalena in Speyer, inscripted "Dr. Edith Stein lived and taught here. She died as a martyr in Auschwitz.", and the dates of beatification and canonisation

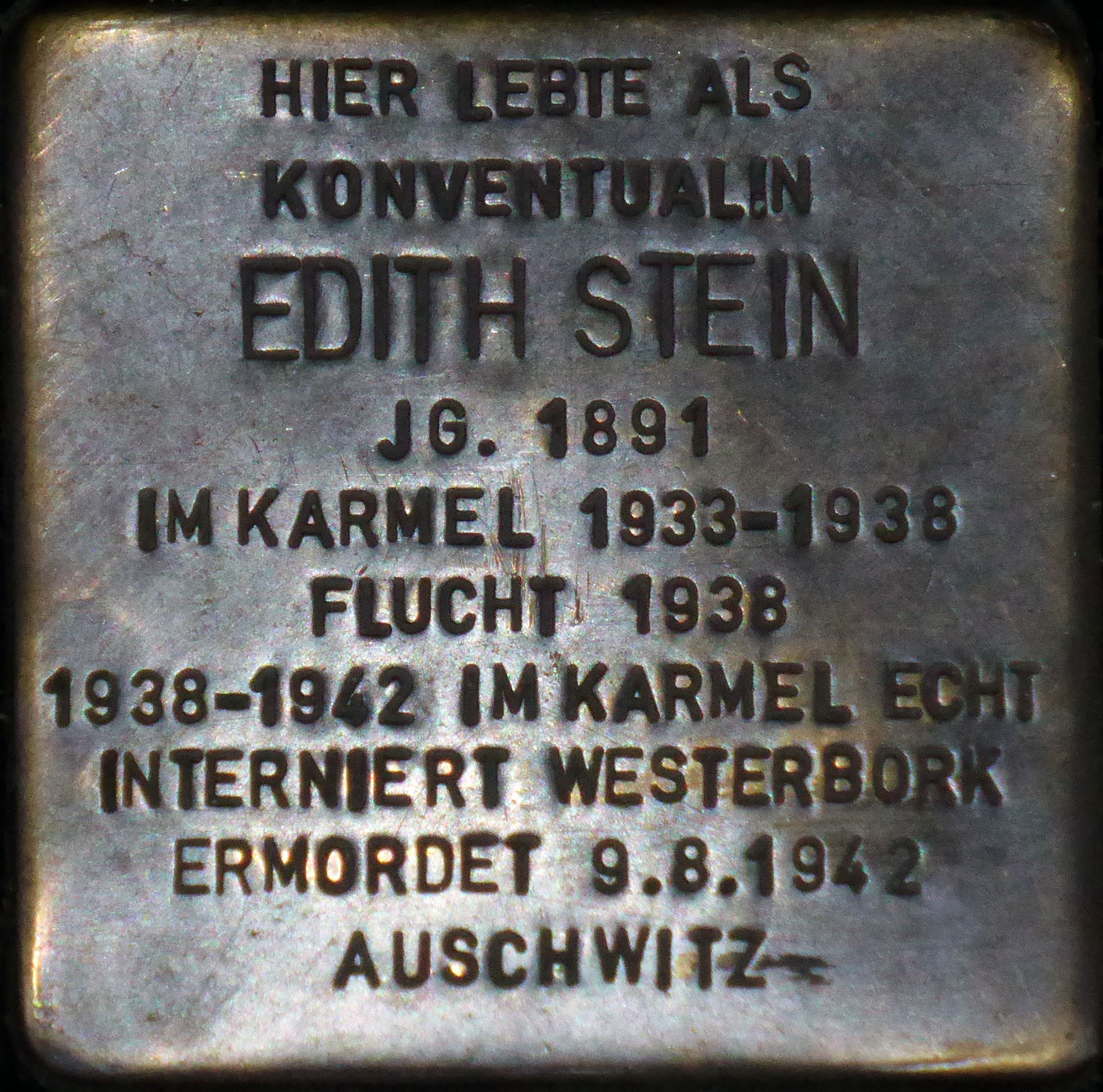
Stolperstein at the site of the former Carmelite convent in Köln-Lindenthal, where Edith Stein lived as a conventual

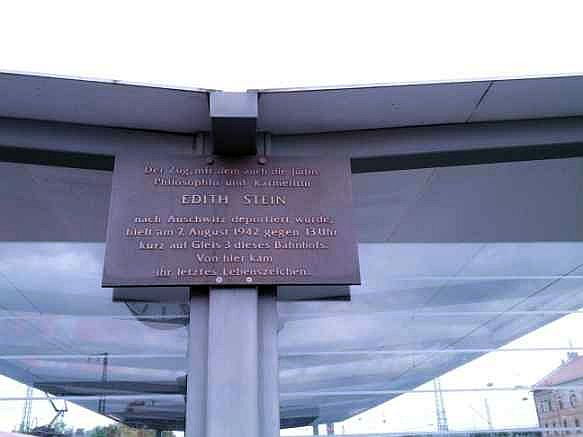
Plaque at the train station in Schifferstadt, from where Edith Stein sent a last sign of life on the transport to Auschwitz

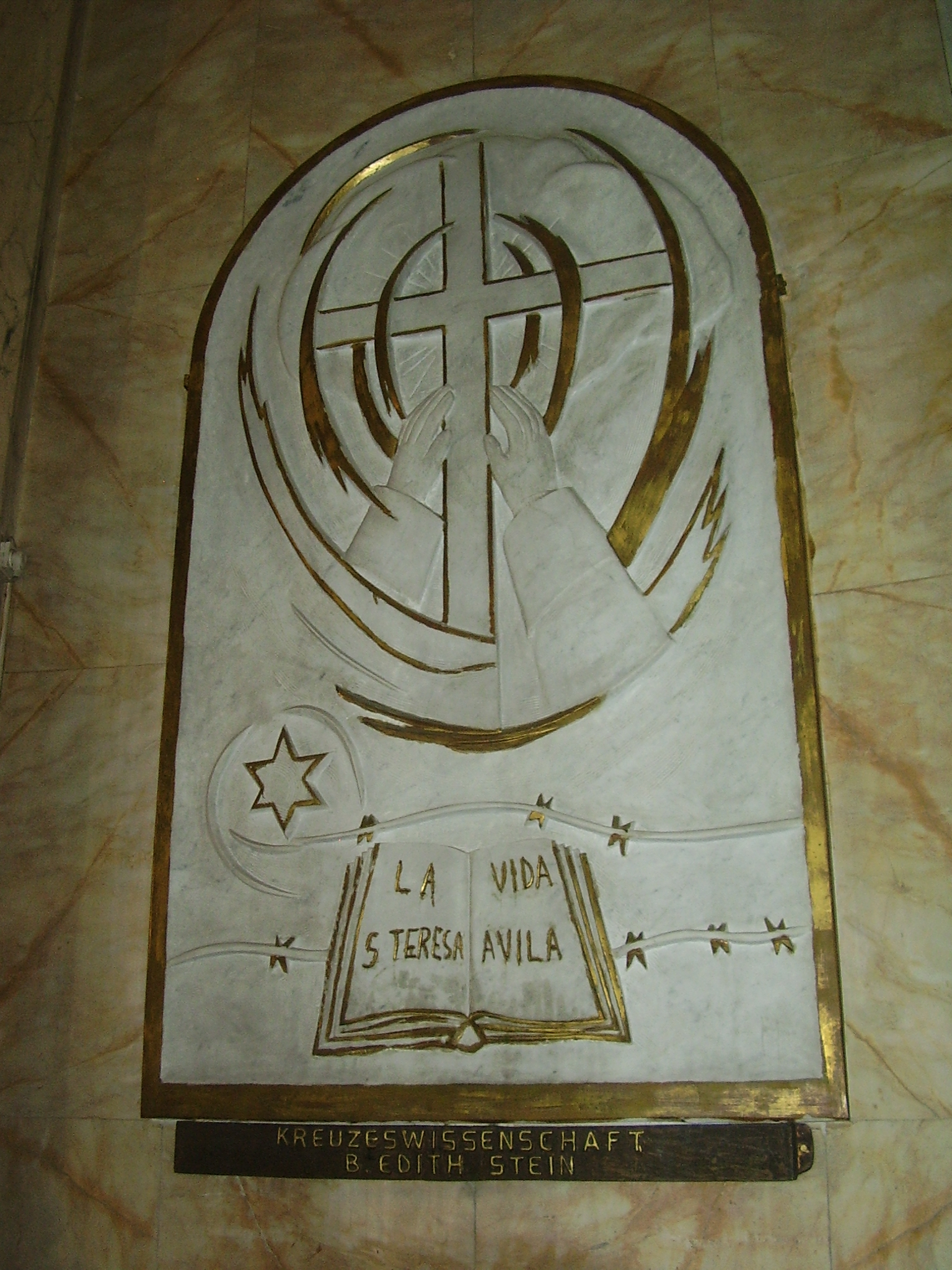
Memorial to Edith Stein in Stella Maris Monastery, Haifa, Israel

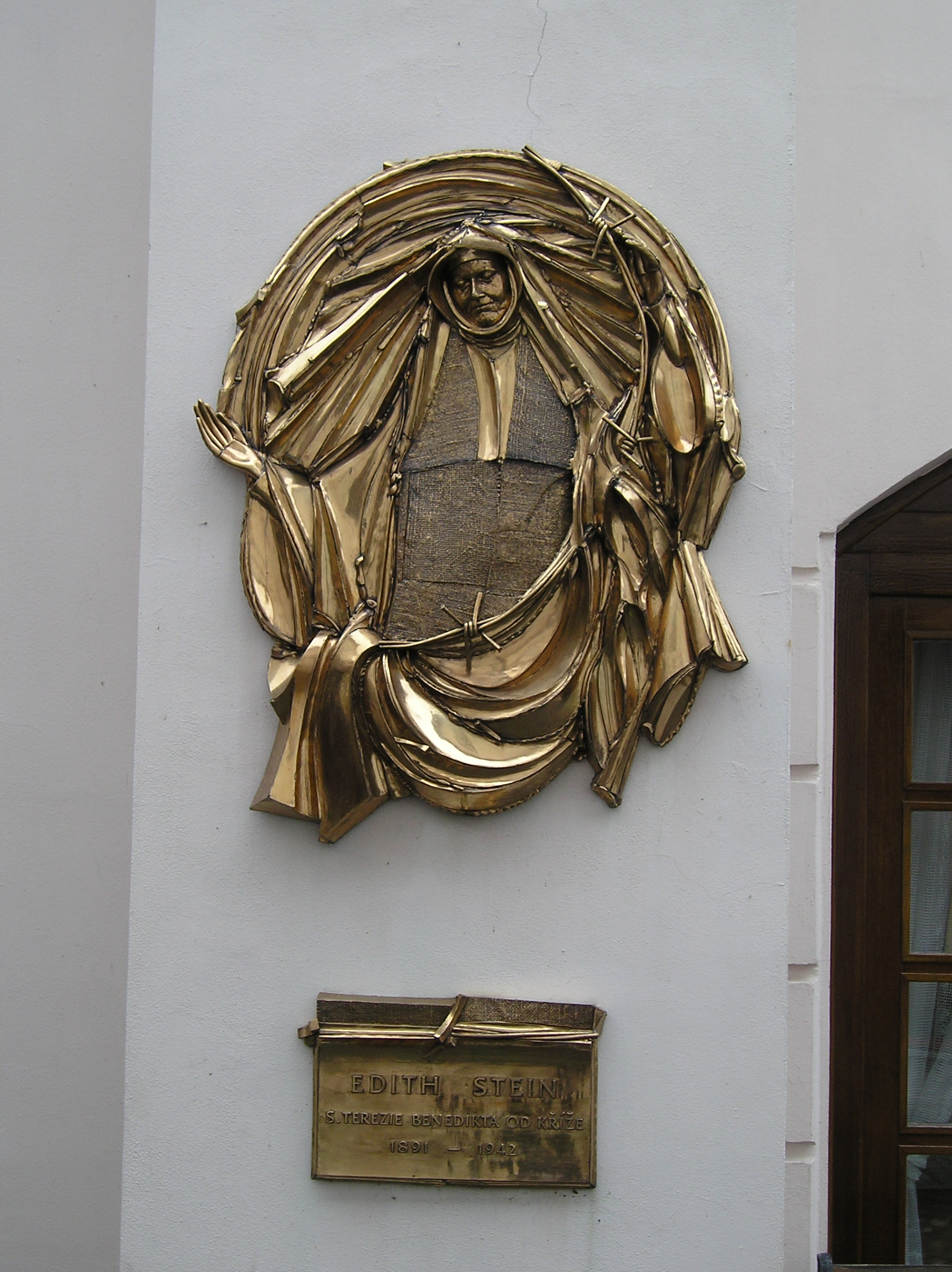
Memorial to Edith Stein in Prague, Czech Republic

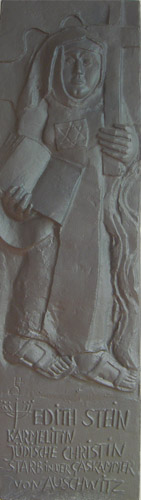
Edith Stein in a relief by Heinrich Schreiber in the Church of Our Lady in Wittenberg, Germany

== Schools and academic buildings ==
There are many schools and academic buildings named in tribute to her, including:

- Lubliniec, Poland
- Darmstadt, Germany,
- Hengelo, Netherlands,
- Mississauga, Ontario, Canada.
- A women's dormitory at the University of Tübingen
- In Vienna, the Edith-Stein-Haus at Ebendorferstraße 8 is the main location of the Catholic University Chaplaincy and the university pastoral care of the Archdiocese of Vienna. In the spirit of Karl Strobl's model of the "Catholic Student House", the house is also home to a chapel consecrated to Edith Stein as well as a dormitory for about 90 students.
