= Lennebergwald =

Coordinates: 50.012°N 8.167°E

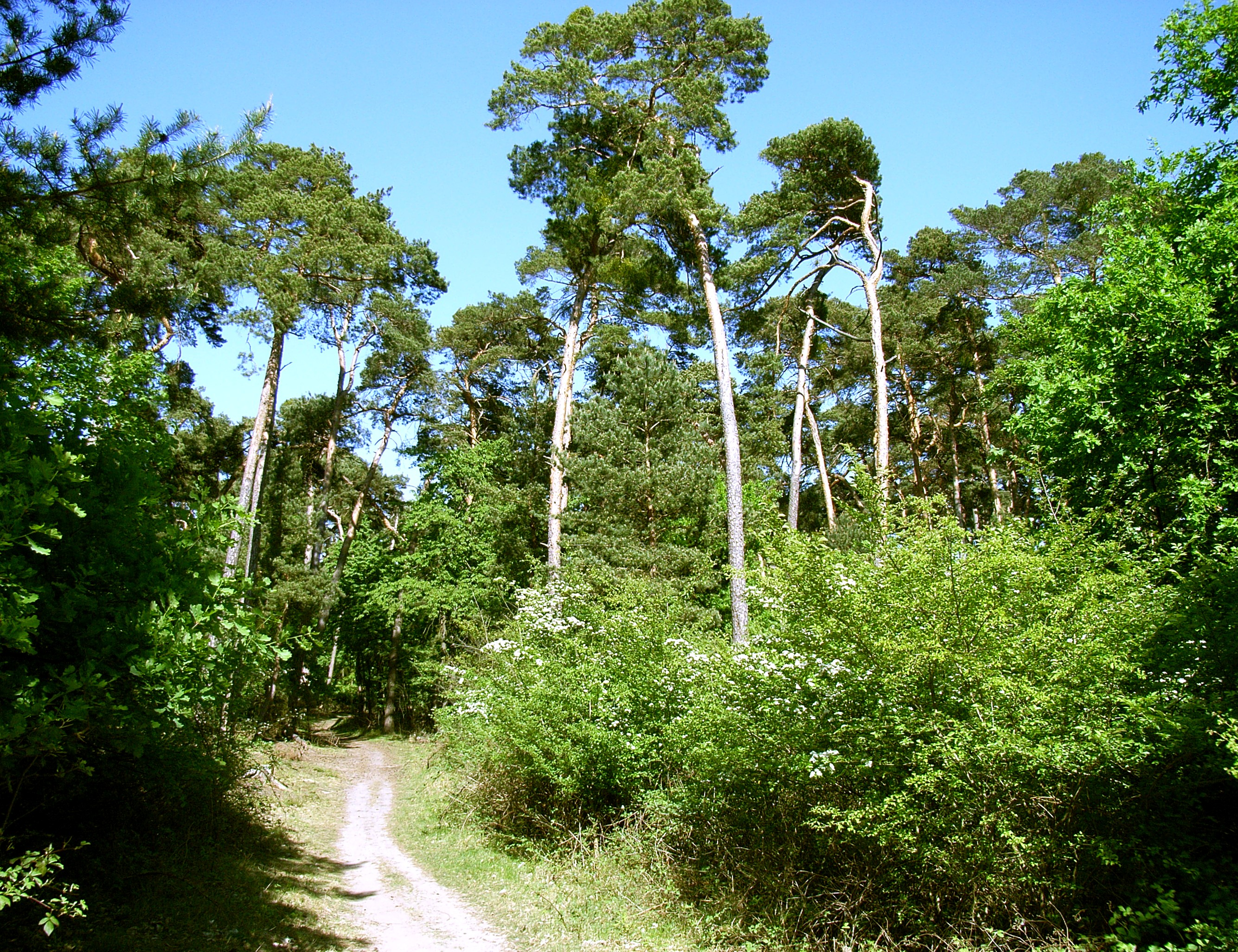
The Lennebergwald.

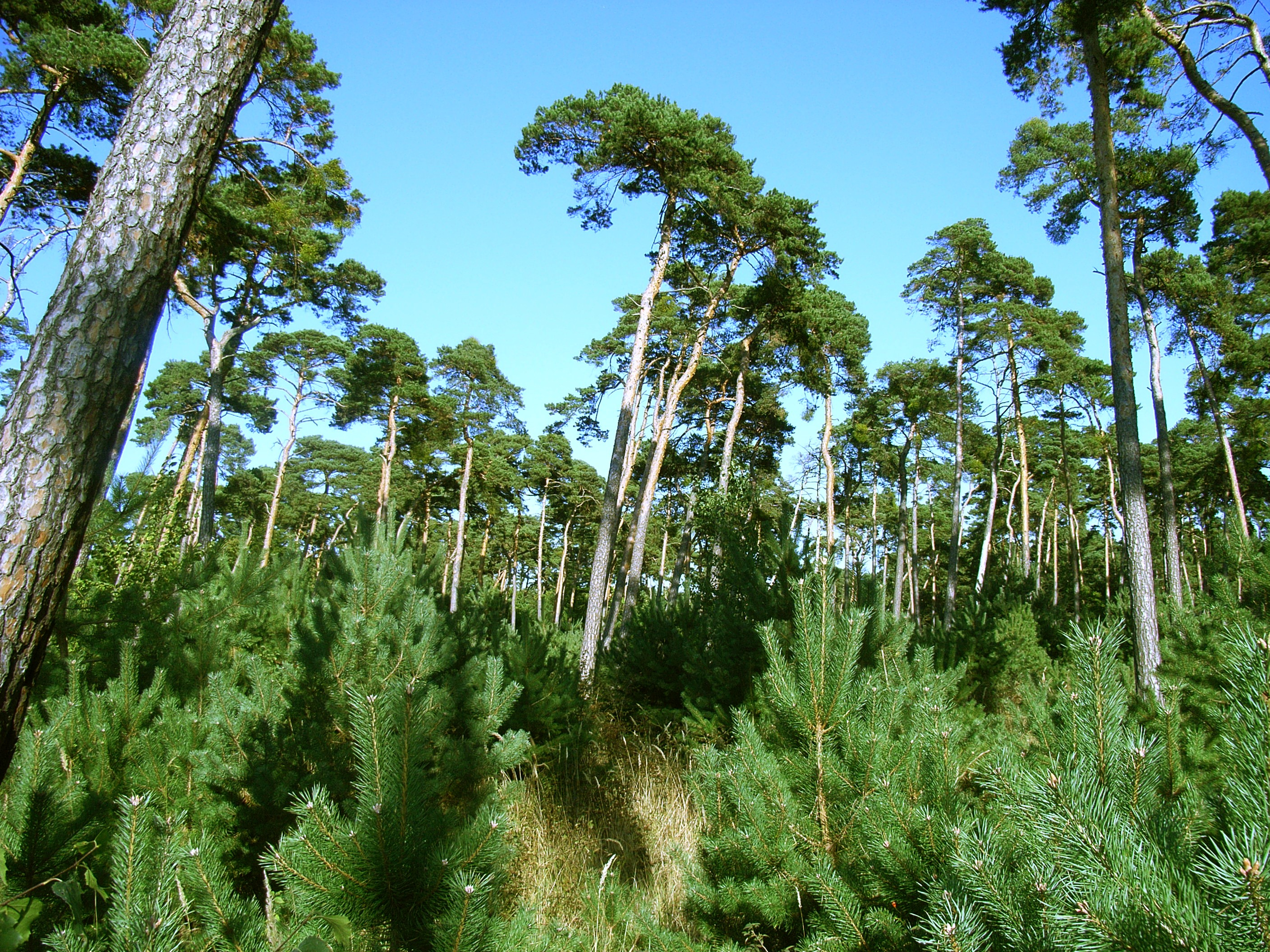
The Lennebergwald near Uhlerborn.

The Lennebergwald is a forest in the north of Rheinhessen in Rhineland-Palatinate in Germany. The approximately 700 ha sized stretches north-west of Mainz between the urban districts of Mombach, Gonsenheim, Finthen and the municipalities of Budenheim and Heidesheim am Rhein in the district of Mainz-Bingen. Most of the area belongs to Budenheim.

Characteristic of the Lennebergwald is its dry and sandy soil, resulting in a high ground temperature during summer days. Due to this primarily pine and oak trees as well as dry and calcareous grassland are growing here like in the neighbouring Mainz Sand Dunes. The climate is temperate and semi-arid to semi-humid.

Considering the aspect of ecology, the Lenneberg forest has a high importance as a recreation area for people performing general fitness training such as jogging, Nordic walking, mountainbiking as well as for people strolling around the wooded area. Within the Lennebergwald some cultural heritage monuments of Budenheim, such as the old St.-Wendelinus-chapel, the Lennebergtower (a look-out in Gothic Revival architecture comprising a stair tower, 1878–1880 by Philipp Johann Berdellé), the new St.-Wendelinus-chapel (Gothic Revival limestone hall, 1862–1866) as well as the elevated water supply tanks of Budenheim (Art Nouveau rotunda, erected 1907, by architect Wilhelm Lenz) and Gonsenheim (Art Nouveau building, 1909, also by Wilhelm Lenz).

== Literature ==
- Monika Bub, Martin Löschmann, Klaus Meyer: Der Lennebergwald bei Mainz. Rheinland-Pfalz: Mitteilungen der Landesforstverwaltung Rheinland-Pfalz (Nr. 13). Ministerium für Umwelt und Forsten (Abteilung Forsten), Mainz 1996, 79 (V) S.
