= Herz-Jesu-Kirche, Mainz =

Church building in Mombach, Germany

Coordinates: 50°01′19″N 8°13′42″E

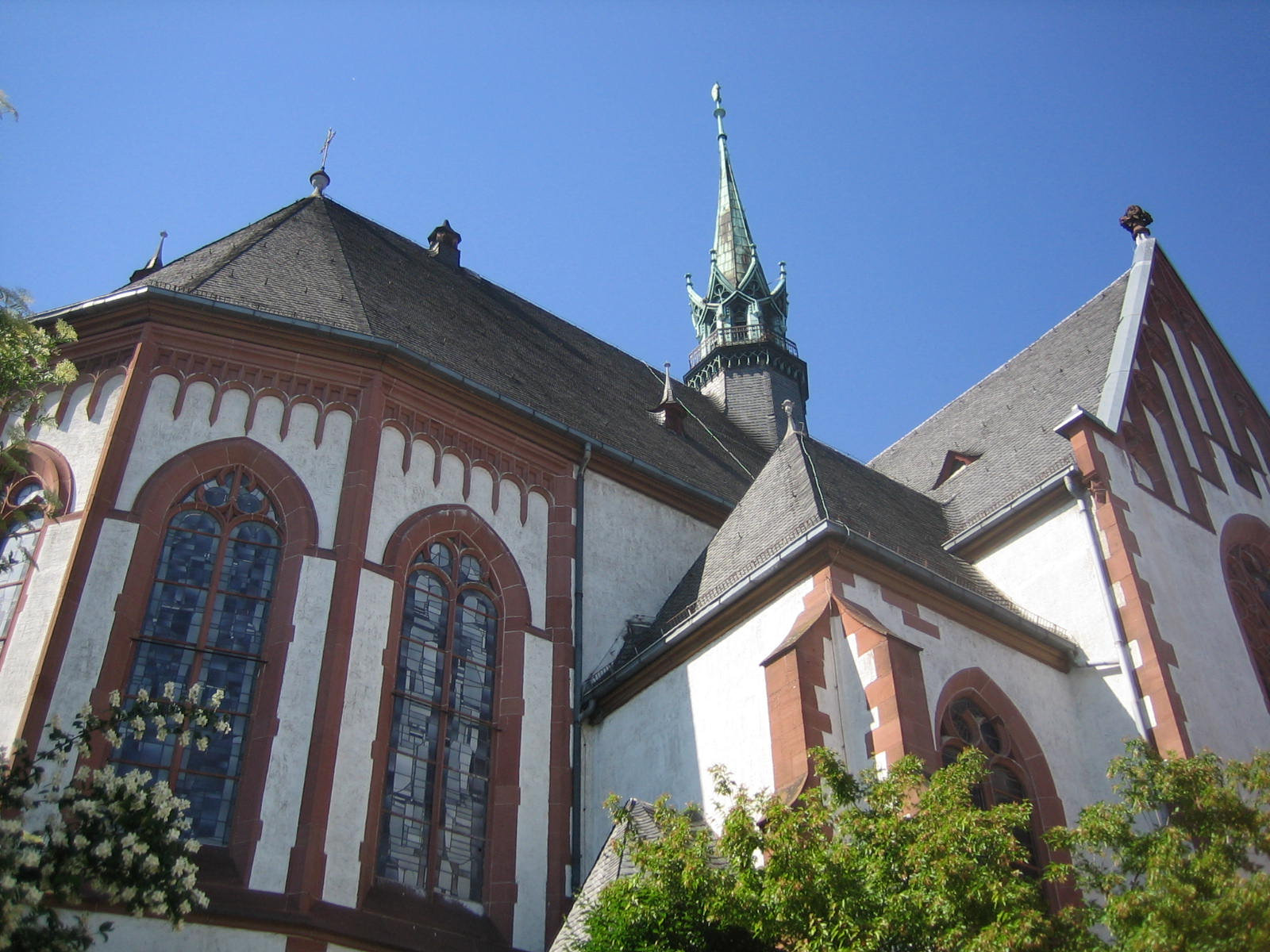
Herz-Jesu-Kirche, Mombach

The Catholic Herz-Jesu-Kirche (Church of the Sacred Heart) is a Neo-Gothic hall church located in the borough Mombach of the German city of Mainz. It is dedicated to the Sacred Heart. The church calendar of 1911 says: The name "Sacred Heart Church" originated from the idea to honour the memory of the great social bishop von Ketteler, who throughout his life was a pious and zealous admirer of the Sacred Heart, in his hundredth year of birth.

== History ==
The Herz-Jesu-Kirche was built by Ludwig Becker in Gothic Revival architecture as a memorial of Bishop Wilhelm Emmanuel Freiherr von Ketteler in the largest working class district of Mainz. Constructive works began 9 August 1911, but were interrupted by the First World War. The Bishop of Mainz, Georg Heinrich Kirstein, laid the first stone. The work was previously completed 28 September 1913 for the choir.

Planned as a basilica with a façade flank tower, only the choir, transept and Ketteler memorial chapel were built. Neo-Late Gothic, picturesquely grouped plaster building with divisions in red sandstone. The church presents a polygonal choir with varied side choirs. Above the crossing is an eight-sided ridge turret with an idiosyncratically shaped copper pointed helmet with a crowning figure of the Sacred Heart of Jesus. Tracery window. The clear spatial effect of the light-filled interior is characterised by net and star vaults above clustered pillars. Good stonemasonry work by Hans Steinheim and Josef Neumann, Eltville. South of the choir, representative sacristy building with stair tower. The sacred building, dominating the townscape, is typical of the late historian Becker's striving for monumentality of appearance. Its originality is expressed in the fusion of various historical models and their individual reformulation.

The stained glass windows were created by Alois Plum. After the backup and restoration of the choir in 2001, the choir was painted by Vitus Wurmdobler.

In 1969/70 north-side extension with community rooms and redesign of the choir room. The modern glass windows by Alois Blum, Mainz, impress especially in contrast with the equally high-quality neo-Gothic style. The Ketteler memorial chapel has a ceiling; it is worth climbing the spiral staircase, as the room above surprises with its height.

Since the nave with its large tower was not built, the choir with its transept lacked an abutment. Securing the ring anchors was therefore necessary in 1999/2001. In the course of this renovation, the choir room was painted by Vitus Wurmdobler, Erbes Büdesheim. A design which, according to the church's monument preservation department, is unique in its kind. So it is not surprising that it was discussed controversial. The large abstract wooden cross of cubes and ashlars, originally by Alois Plum, was given a corpus with a baroque corona later. The replacement of the earlier original fluorescent tube lamps by modern "Mikado" incandescent wheel lamps is also worth a look. Since 2011, a 16-part Stations of the Cross has been impressive. Carved by the Mombacher citizen Jupp Schmitt from the wood of a lime tree that stood in the parish garden of St. Nilolaus.
