= Alois Plum =

German painter (1935–2024)

- Born: Alois Johannes Plum; 2 March 1935; Mainz, Germany
- Died: 13 August 2024 (aged 89)
- Known for: Stained glass, Ceramics, Painting

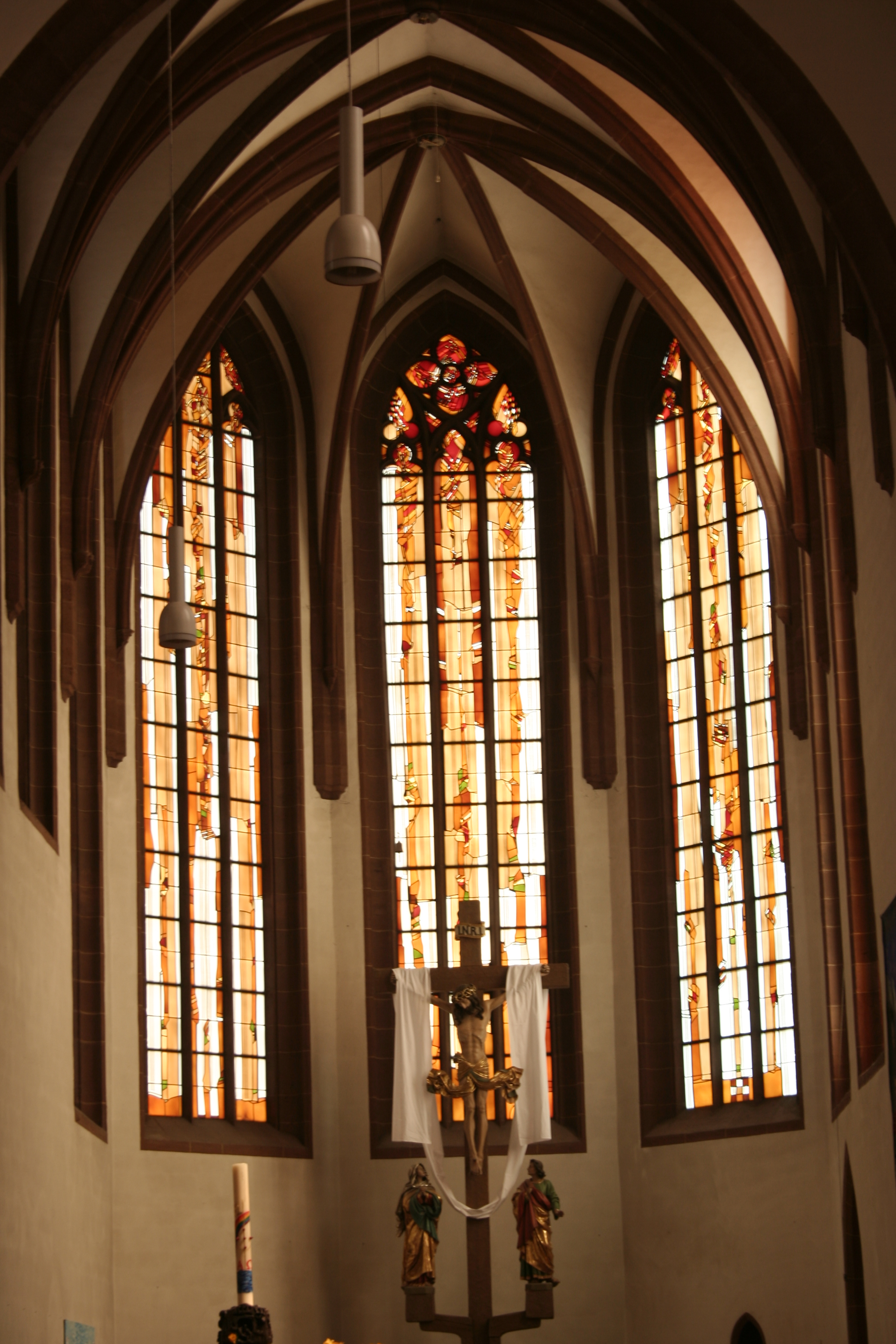
Stained glass windows by Alois Plum in St. Martin Church, Kaiserslautern.

Alois Johannes Plum (2 March 1935 – 13 August 2024) was a German artist, who has acquired a national reputation for his stained glass, his paintings (esp. murals), and his plastic art. Plum has been active since the 1950s and his work decorates hundreds of churches and public buildings in Germany. He has created many characteristic stained glass windows in churches renovated or rebuilt after the destruction of World War II, and is especially noted for his reinterpretation of historic sacred space and his integration of glass and architecture with careful attention to the liturgical function of his art.

== Biography, career ==
Alois Plum was born in 1935, the son of Josef Plum (d. 1988), who is mainly known for designing ecclesiastical paraments and especially robes and mitres. Josef Plum was also a painter and graphic artist, noted for his religious imagery. Alois Plum was trained at the Landeskunstschule in Mainz from 1951 to 1955, and spent a summer studying in Salzburg with Oskar Kokoschka. From 1955 to 1957 he studied with Georg Meistermann at the Kunstakademie Düsseldorf, and since 1957 has worked independently in Mainz. His first work as a stained glass artist was executed in 1954, in the parish church in Niederrœdern. A notable early work was a mosaic of the Stations of the Cross in Steinheim. Perhaps his largest work to date can be found in the Worms Cathedral, for which he designed, over three decades, a large number of stained glass windows; the earlier windows (dating to 1911) had been destroyed by allied bombing in 1943.

Plum's assignments came from all over Germany. Sometimes the themes were dictated, sometimes he was free to choose, in which case Plum decided between figurative or symbolical representations. He was usually free in his choice of material, and his oeuvre includes works in many different materials, including traditional stained glass (set in lead), glass set in concrete (Plum used two different kinds: "Dallglas," an opaque float glass, and "Antikglass," a handblown glass), and glass brick.

In 2010, Cardinal Karl Lehmann, Bishop of Mainz, praised Plum for his art and the service it performs to the greater good, in a book that explains the Catholic creed and uses Plum's stained glass for illustrating elements of the creed.

Plum died on 13 August 2024, at the age of 89.

== Notable works ==
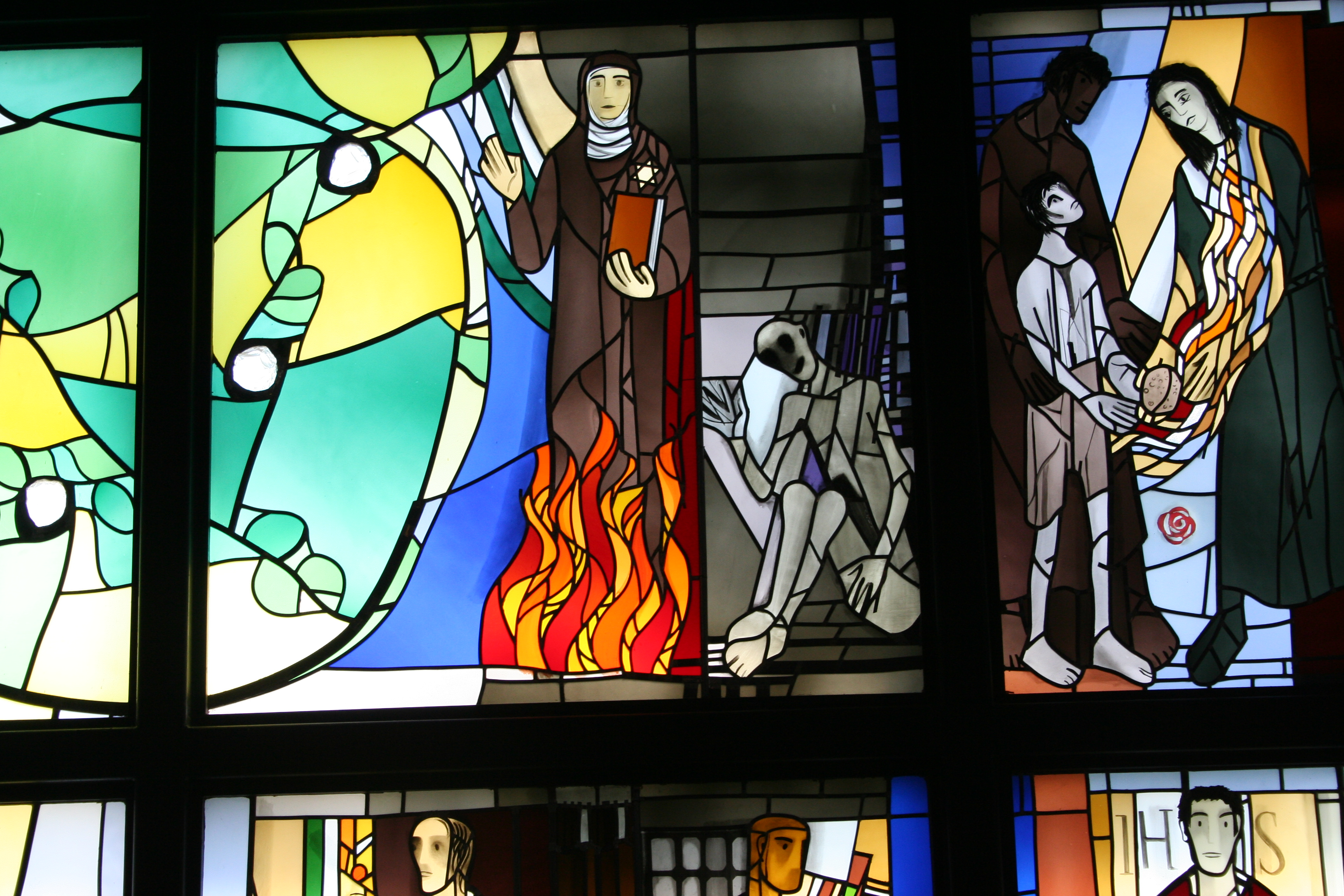
Two modern saints: Edith Stein and Maximilian Kolbe; stained glass by Alois Plum in the Herz Jesu church, Kassel.

- Blessed Virgin Mary, relief, Mainz-Weisenau, 1954 (rest. 2004).
- Stained glass windows, St. Bartholomew church, Saulheim, 1957.
- Mural behind altar, Lutherkirche, Köln, 1963, for newly built protestant church designed by Otto Vogel.
- Stained glass windows and glass wall in St. Christoph, Mainz (destroyed in WW2, partly rebuilt as a monument), 1964.
- Stained glass windows, Worms Cathedral, Worms, 1966-1995. Includes nineteen windows in the clerestory, ten in the ambulatory, and thirteen in the nave, among others, adding a "highly personal interpretation" to the church." Esp. notable is the "Valentine window" (1978), dedicated to Saint Valentine of Terni.
- Mural, Sankt Kilian church in Mainz-Kostheim, 1984.
- Stained glass windows, Mariae Himmelfahrt church, Mainz-Weisenau, 1965-2005.
- Stained glass windows, in Herz-Jesu-Kirche, in Mainz-Mombach, 1970.

== See also ==
- Christian art
