= Mainz-Mombach station =

Railway station in Germany

Mainz Mombach
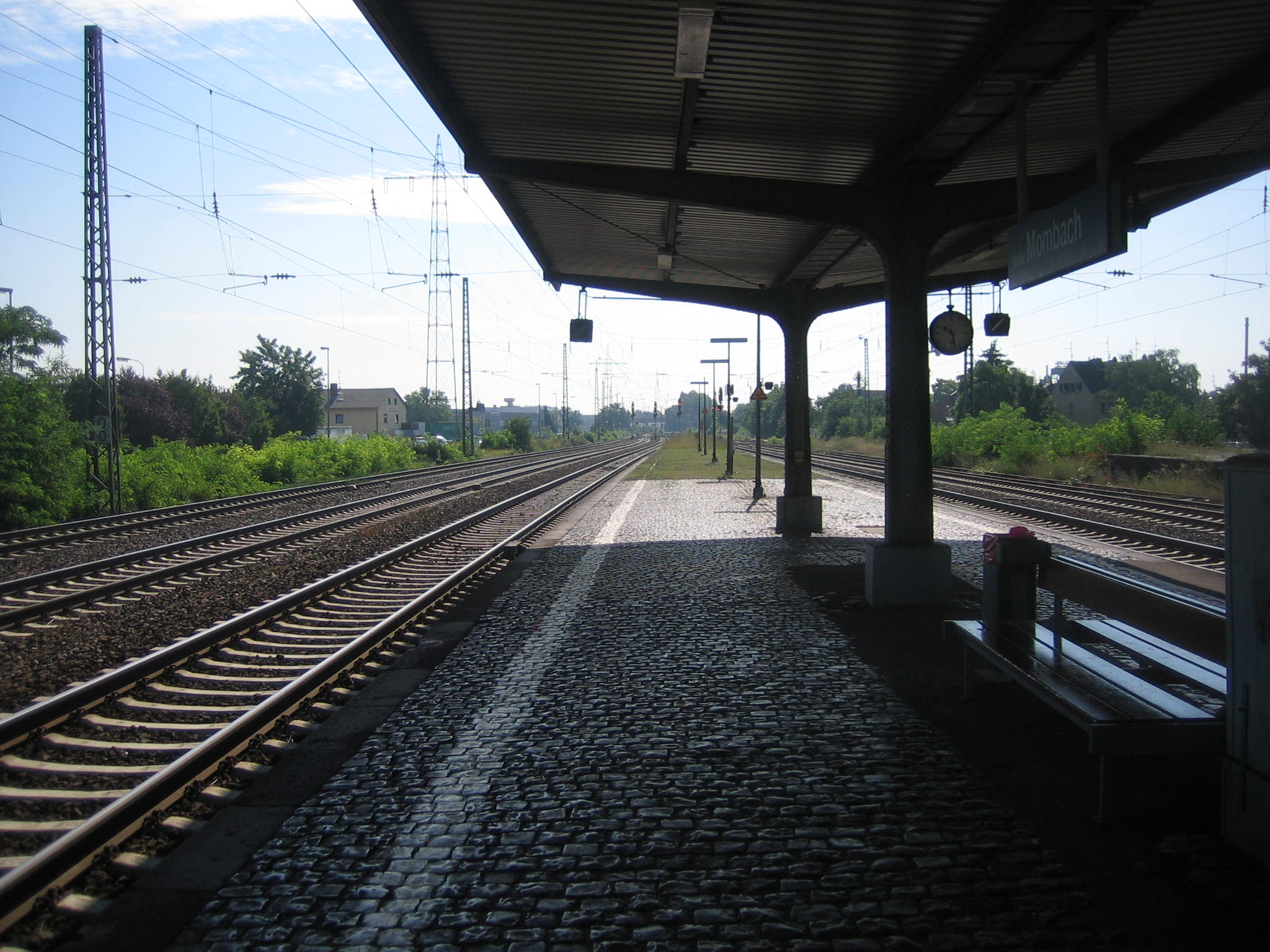
- Six rail tracks run into the station

General information
- Location: Mombach, Rhineland-Palatinate; Germany
- Coordinates: 50°1′22″N 08°13′47″E
- Owner: Deutsche Bahn
- Operator: DB Station&Service
- Line: West Rhine Railway

Other information
- Station code: 3907
- DS100 code: FMM
- Category: 5
- Fare zone: : 6511; RNN: 300 (RMV transitional tariff)
- Website: www.bahnhof.de

Services
Preceding station	Trans Regio	Following station
Mainz Hbf Terminus	RB 26	Budenheim towards Köln Messe/Deutz
Location
- Location within Rhineland-Palatinate Location within Germany Location within Europe

Mainz-Mombach station is one of two railway stations in the suburb of Mombach of the German town of Mainz. Due to its central location it is the primary station of the suburb besides the halt “Waggonfabrik”. The station is a part of the West Rhine Railway and borders the Wye: Gleisdreieck Mainz, leading to the Kaiserbrücke (Mainz) and the main station Mainz.

It is served by Mittelrheinbahn electrified standard gauge trains. Long-distance trains call at the central station, Mainz Hauptbahnhof.

Six rail tracks run into the train station with a central island platform. Due to the geography of the village, the station is entered on street level, one level below the elevated platform, with trains entering on the embankment. A tiled passenger tunnel leads to the platform. The goods station is located nearby as an independent facility not directly connected with the passenger station. The goods station lost its role as a hub, when the local goods function was drastically reduced. The goods sheds are still used for storing goods as depots of road freight companies that replaced the railway.
