= Mainz-Amöneburg =

Coordinates: 50°02′02″N 8°15′06″E

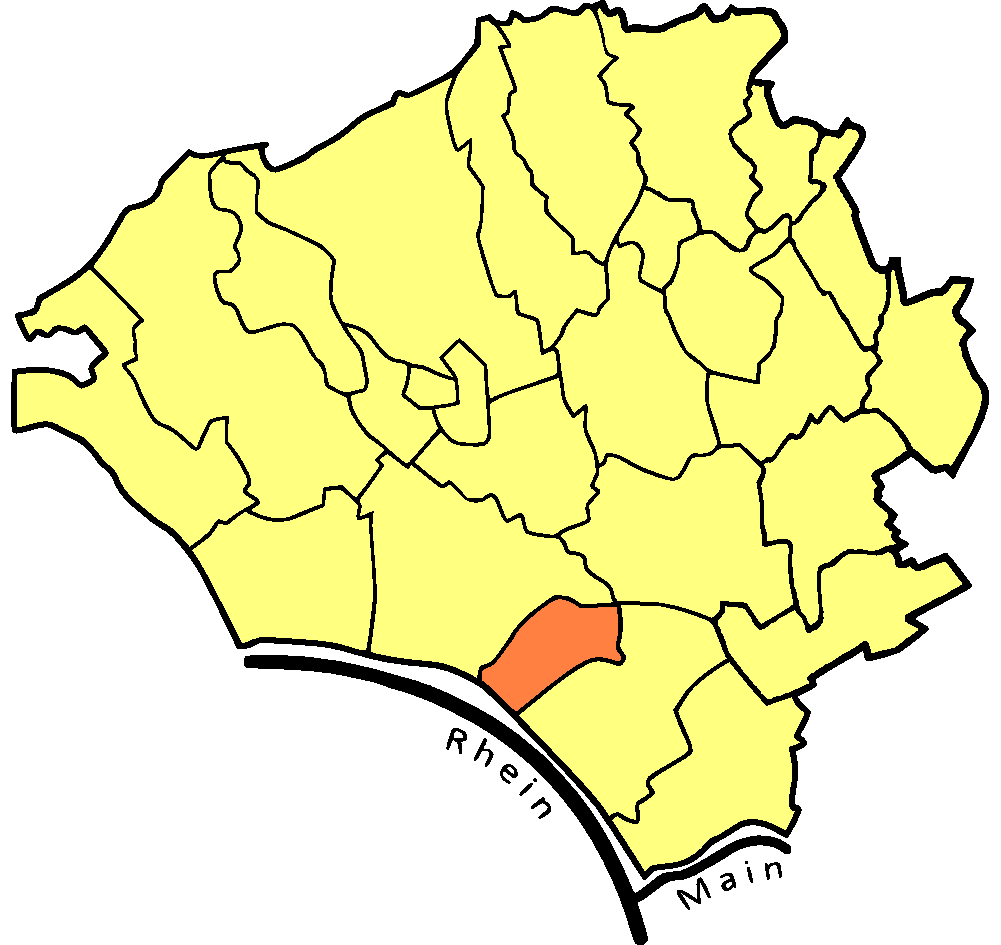
Location of Mainz-Amöneburg

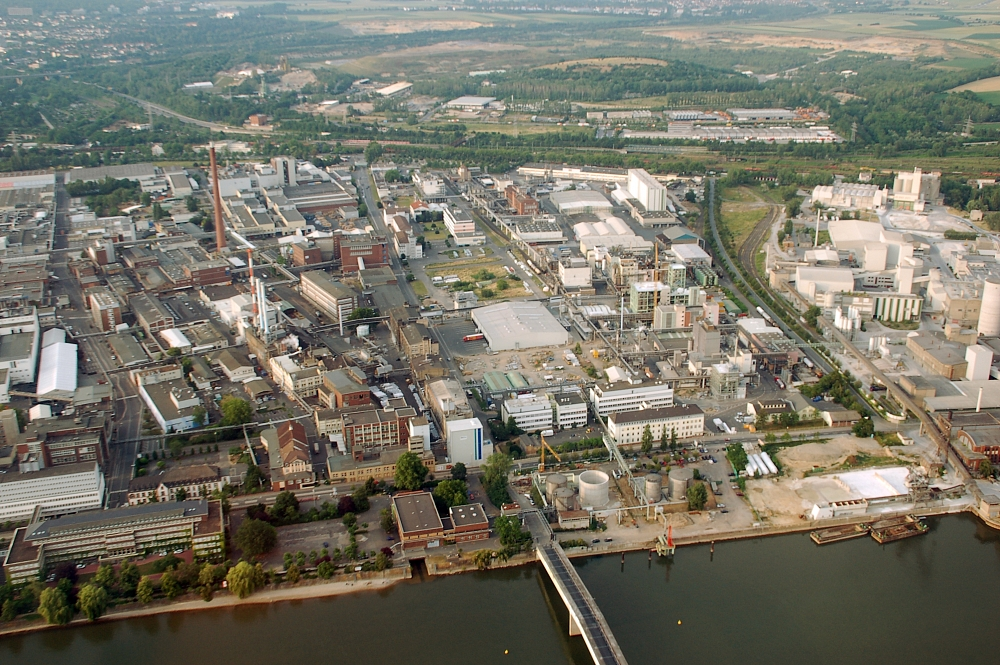
Location of InfraServ

Mainz-Amöneburg (German pronunciation: [ˈmaɪnts aˈmøːnəbʊʁk]) is a district administered by the city of Wiesbaden, Germany. Its population is 1,743 (2020). Mainz-Amöneburg was formerly a district of the city of Mainz, until the public administration by the city of Wiesbaden was decided on August 10, 1945. The reason for this had been the easy control of the Allied Occupation Zones in Germany, where the Rhine formed the border between the American sector and the French sector. Mainz-Amöneburg faces the city of Mainz on the opposite shore of the Rhine river. The former border between the Grand Duchy of Hesse and the Prussian Province of Hesse-Nassau lay between Amöneburg and Biebrich until 1945.

Two companies which were at first independent, but which later belonged to the same company, Hoechst AG, had been located in Amöneburg (Chemische Werke Albert) and Biebrich (Kalle & Co.), one on each side of the border. Recent mergers, acquisitions and transitions took place. Now, the industrial site InfraServ Wiesbaden runs the infrastructure.
