= Bundesautobahn 643 =

Federal motorway in Germany

A 643
- Bundesautobahn 643

Route information
- Length: 8.4 km (5.2 mi)
- Existed: 1966–present

Location
- Country: Germany
- States: Hesse, Rhineland-Palatinate

Highway system
- Roads in Germany; Autobahns; List; Federal; List; State; E-roads

Bundesautobahn 643 (translates from German as Federal Motorway 643, short form Autobahn 643, abbreviated as BAB 643 or A 643) is a 8.4-kilometer (5.2 mi) short autobahn in Germany. The motorway crosses the Rhine River, connecting the cities of Wiesbaden and Mainz, the capital cities of the German states of Hesse and Rhineland-Palatinate, respectively. It is one of two autobahns in Germany that connect two neighboring state capitals in only one exit.

However short the A 643 may be, it is a vital link within the Frankfurt Rhine-Main Region, being only one of three routes across the Rhine in the region. It is an important connection between Autobahn 66 on the north bank of the Rhine and A 60 south of Mainz.

== History ==
The A 643 was built in 1966, together with the Mainz Ring Road, the A 60. The original plan for the highway included a section from Wiesbaden to Taunusstein-Neuhof, replacing a section of Bundesstraße 417. This project was never realized.

== Route ==
The A 643 begins at the Dotzheim Interchange in Wiesbaden as a continuation of Schiersteiner Straße (Bundesstraße 262) to and from the city center (alternatively, southbound traffic on Schiersteiner Straße can continue on Saarstraße/Kreisstraße 645 to Schierstein). This interchange also includes an exit ramp to Erich-Ollenhauser Straße (K 655), which leads northwest to Wiesbaden-Dotzheim and southeast to Biebrich.

The A 643 soon intersects with the A 66 at Schiersteiner Kreuz. It crosses the border with Rhineland-Palatinate on the Rhine with the Schierstein Bridge. It then leads to the Hochstraße Lenneberg in the Mainz district of Mombach, through the Mainz Sand Dunes nature reserve, and ends at the Mainz Dreieck in the A 60.

== Exit list ==
B 262 Wiesbaden
(1)	Wiesbaden-Dotzheim
(2)	Schiersteiner Kreuz 4-way interchange A 66
	Bahnbrücke 50 m
(3)	Wiesbaden-Äppelallee
	Straßenbrücke 100 m
	Schiersteiner Brücke 1282 m
	neue Schiersteiner Brücke (planned)
(4)	Mainz-Mombach
	Hochstraße Lenneberg 949 m
(5)	Mainz-Gonsenheim
(6)	Autobahndreieck Mainz 3-way interchange A 60 E42
