= Mainz Sand Dunes =

Coordinates: 50°00′55″N 8°12′25″E

The Mainz Sand Dunes (German: Großer Sand) are a small geological and botanical supra-region and important nature preserve in Mainz, Germany. Within this protected area rare plants and animals can be found. Some of the species represented here, such as the Purple Golden-drop, (Onosma arenaria) grow only here and in small numbers.

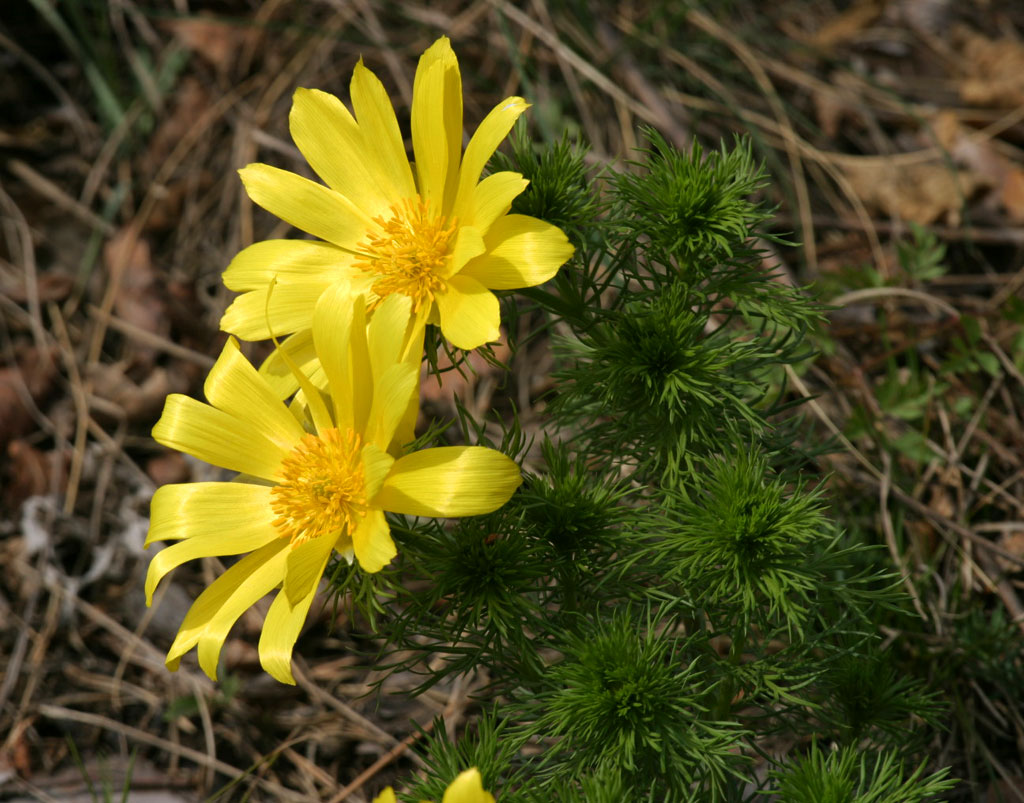
Spring Pheasant's-Eye

The sand dunes developed after the last ice age (Würm glaciation) and the first resettlement of grassland plants occurred approximately 12,000 years ago. The dry sandy soils are poor of nutrients but relict flora from the glaciation grasslands grow favorably. These plants are found otherwise only in southeast-European, inner-Asiatic (Pontic Steppe) areas and in the Mediterranean respectively. The effective surface of the protected landscape is rather small at 1.27 square kilometers.

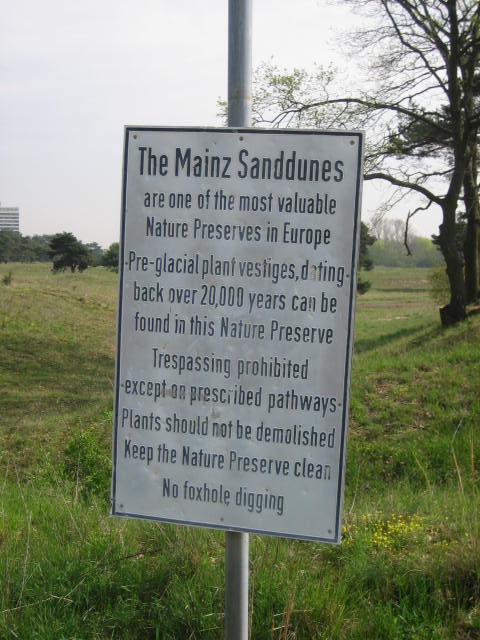
Explanation sign

The Sand Dunes can be found between the suburbs Gonsenheim and Mombach and stretches up to the floodplains beginning in Mombach. Bordering the dunes is the Lennebergwald, with an area of 7 km² and therefore the biggest contiguous forest in Rheinhessen. The Lenneberg forest is also protected and shows to some extent the same flora and fauna.

== The development of the sand dunes ==
In the late Pleistocene, just before the end of the last ice age and during the short summers, sand-drifts were blown from the Rhine Valley into the area of the present dunes, forming this unique geology. The soil consists almost solely of high lime component with fine white sand, which barely retains water and nutritive but is easily warmed by sunlight.
