= Mombach =

- Borough of Mainz
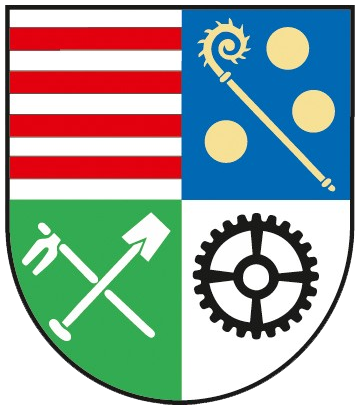
- Coat of arms

- Location of Mombach within Mainz
- Interactive map of Mombach
- Location within Germany Location within Rhineland-Palatinate
- Coordinates: 50°1′N 8°13′E
- Country: Germany
- State: Rhineland-Palatinate
- District: Urban district
- City: Mainz

Government
  - Mayor (2024–29): Christian Kanka (SPD)

Area
  - Total: 6.32 km^{2} (2.44 sq mi)
- Elevation: 85–115 m (279–377 ft)

Population (2025)
  - Total: 13,734
  - Density: 2,170/km^{2} (5,630/sq mi)
- Time zone: UTC+01:00 (CET)
  - Summer (DST): UTC+02:00 (CEST)
- Postal codes: 55120
- Dialling codes: 06131
- Website: mainz.de

Mombach, with 13,734 inhabitants (December 2025), is a borough in the northwest corner of Mainz, Germany. Mombach can be reached via Mainz-innenstadt (downtown) or Bundesautobahn 643.

== Location ==
Mombach is located on the southern (left) bank of the river Rhine, flowing from east to west after converging with the Main. The Rhine is the northern border. Mombach lies in the Mainz basin below the Rheinhessen Plateau.

=== Climate ===
Like Rheinhessen, Mombach is protected by Hunsrück, Taunus, Odenwald and Donnersberg. The average yearly temperature of Mombach is 11.5 degrees Celsius (53 °F). The annual rainfall is below 500 liters per square meter (19.7 in) and comes near to a semi-arid to mediterranean climate. There are around 1,665 hours of sunshine per year.

== History ==
In 2006 Mombach celebrated its 750-year jubilee. Mombach had been originally a location of farmers, mariners and fishermen.

=== Prehistory to Middle Ages ===
Archeological excavations prove that the site of Mombach had been already settled in prehistoric times. A flat hatchet dated to the early Bronze Age has been found in Mombach as well as many discoveries from Roman times. The formation of the locality happened most likely during the Frankish realm. The name Mombach is derived most likely from the Frankish name Muno (Munno). The 750-year jubilee dates back to a document of 1256 mentioning the city, but the locality is surely older.

=== France's urge to the Rhine ===
During the Thirty Years' War, with the change of occupying forces of Mainz and surroundings (also Swedish and imperialists), the French troops deployed up to Mainz in the year 1644. During the first period of the war Anselm Casimir Wambold von Umstadt held the position as Amtmann of the village named by the cathedral chapter of Mainz Cathedral. As soon as the garrison had been weakened by the Ottoman wars in Europe, the French returned again. They devastated and occupied the left bank of the Rhine up to its natural border in 1688 including Mainz without a declaration of war. Not much later in 1689 Mainz had been reconquered by imperial forces in the war of the Palatinian Succession.

=== During the Electorate ===
The location had been surrounded by a wall during the electoral times. Parts of this wall are components of old buildings to this day. The historical core of Mombach is the Lindenplatz. Most of the important buildings of that time grouped round the old tilia, the first chapel of Saint Nicholas, the common bakery oven and the schoolhouse. In 1703 the first Saint Nicholas church had been consecrated. Mombach has been independent from the town's clerical nobility St. Peter since then. The vicar of Mainz Cathedral de la Roche had been given the necessary funds. Shortly after this, a new municipality and schoolhouse could be erected. During the 18th century an ardour for the countryside occurred and Mombach could benefit from this. The buildings Walderdorfsche Anlage, Kesselstadtsche Anlage and the Rondell had been erected during this time.

=== Second French occupation ===
In 1792 General Custine abolished the electoral administration. With the repeated occupation of the left bank of the Rhine by the French Revolutionary Army, the collegial administration of Mombach by St. Peter had been terminated. After the collapse of the First Coalition, the Treaty of Campo Formio and the confirmation in the Treaty of Lunéville Mombach was added to French territory. Since 1801 préfet Jean Bon Saint-André governed the département of Mont-Tonnerre and laid down the old village gates, as well as some saints' memorials in Mombach.

C'est également à cette époque que les vastes champs et prairies situés à basse altitude le long du Rhin furent asséchés par un système de digues et de fossés. Au moyen d'un système de barrage et d'écluses aménagé près de la ville, le barrage d'Inondation, le champ de jardins devant le rempart extérieur ouest pouvait être inondé en cas de siège. Les défenseurs pouvaient ainsi se concentrer sur les lignes des remparts sud et est. Le sol largement inondé rendait difficile pour les assiégeants potentiels l'aménagement de puits d'eau potable, de fossés de course, de voies de communication ainsi que d'abris et de batteries secs.

=== Grand duchy Hesse-Darmstadt ===
After the failing of Napoleon and the Congress of Vienna, the region around Mainz, Bingen, Alzey and Worms came to the Grand duchy of Hesse-Darmstadt. Ever since that the region is called Rheinhessen. Mainz turned into a federal fortress. Numerous fruit growing areas, vineyards and forests were converted into military property. In 1845 the Waggonfabrik Gebrüder Gastell was forced to leave Mainz city and settled in Mombach. Due to safety reasons, such big fire processing production sites were no longer allowed to produce within the fortress's walls. The site of Count von Walderdorf at the fringe of Mombach was chosen. With the completion of the railway track on the left bank of the Rhine, the village received the first railway station in 1859 . This fostered the rural as well as the industrial production. The founding of a chemical production site, today Ineos Paraform in 1856 contributed significantly to this increase. In 1869 the first gymnasium and the school house in the main street were built. The increasing industrialisation of the Gründerzeit after the Franco-Prussian War 1871/71, fostered again the immigration of workers' families. Another railway track, the Hessian Ludwig Railway, led towards Gonsenheim along the Gastell production site in 1871. There was an additional railway station. In 1885 the population increased to 2822 persons, including 485 Protestants.

Today's industrial port had been constructed between 1882 and 1887 as a timber rafting port. In August 1890 the boiler and pressure vessel producer Schmahl founded his company.

=== 20th century ===
At the beginning of the 20th century Mombach received town gas and water supply as well as sewer connection. A coal gasification plant and a water supply network emerged, and the electric tram connected Mombach to Mainz. The most important contemporary Gasometer of Germany was in Mombach.

In 1907 Mombach was suburbanised as one of the first suburbs of Mainz, under the reign of Lord Mayor Karl Göttelmann. With Mombach, Mainz grew to a real large city, defined to have more than 100,000 inhabitants then. Concurrent with the rapid growth of the industrial revolution came their social effects, which were heavily discussed. Mombach as a workers' suburb was chosen as a site for a church monument with a tomb of bishop Wilhelm Emmanuel von Ketteler.

The German Emperor Wilhelm II often watched the military exercises which took place in the Mainz Sand Dunes over many years. These Kaiser-manoeuvres or –parades finally took place in 1913.

Another historical break in the development of the suburb was World War I. In 1918 French troops occupied Mainz again and did not leave it before 1930; the economic situation got worse. In 1937 new barracks were built named after Hugo von Kathen, the last military governor of the Mainz fortress.

In the cause of the bombing of Mainz in World War II Mombach was subject to air raids. Until the end of World War II Mombach was located on two floodplains and had access to a natural Rhine swimming bath. But after Mainz lost its properties on the right bank of the Rhine, the suburbs Amöneburg, Kostheim and Kastel, as well as Bischofsheim, together with the biggest contemporary freight train station, due to the zoning of the Allied Occupation Zones in Germany, Mombach changed to an industrial site. Mainz had not only lost the suburbs, but concurrently 50% of its property and the biggest part of its industrial capacities. Nevertheless, Mombach still has a historical core, with old houses such as the old administration building.

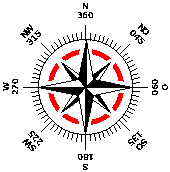
Schierstein	Biebrich	Mainz-Amöneburg
Budenheim		Mainz
Finthen	Gonsenheim	Hartenberg-Münchfeld

== Official emblem ==
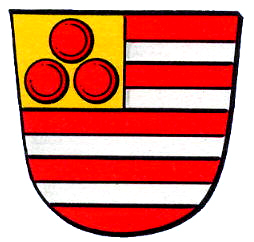
Coat of Arms around 1500

Displays of old Coat of Arms are no longer seen in Mombach. So there is no trace back to older history and affiliation with former proprietors. Early in the Middle Ages Mombach belonged to the estate of the archbishop of Mainz, who assigned the location as a Manslehen. In the 14th century the property rights changed over to the chapter of Mainz and belonged to St. Peter up to Napoleonic times. Due to this the colors of the chapter silver (white)/red, may be found in most of the depictions. Around 1500 three rose gold balls on the right side of the CoA can be found added to the chapter's colours. These refer to the dowry affair of Saint Nicholas, the patron saint of mariners.

Also on a court of law seal of 1741, silver/red bars are the focus. The typical baroque seal shows Nicholas of Myra, the patron saint of the parish church built in 1703, hovering above the clouds with his crosier. In order to identify the bishop, three resurrected children climbing out of a wooden barrel are shown as iconography.

Mombach did not have its own CoA since the French occupation. As the new Mainz town hall had been erected between 1971 and 1974, a full set of coat of arms of all suburbs should be shown in chronological order of the incorporation in the lobby. Due to this a new CoA was drawn up. The traditional depiction with the saint was not regarded as contemporary. The heraldry expert Dr. Leitermann was charged with the creation of a new CoA. The field of the shield is divided by a cross. The four partitions show themes in relation to the history of Mombach and the current Mombach.

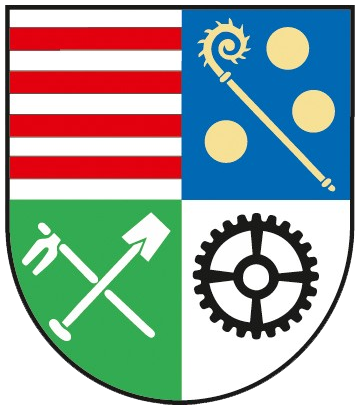
New Coat of Arms since 1974

- the above partitions are related to the history of the parish:
  - right, the escutcheon of the chapter with his characteristic red bars on silver (today white) background, a hint at the former property.
  - left on blue shield a golden crosier with three golden balls can be seen, referring to the patron saint St. Nicholas.
- the below partitions are related to the presence of the year 1974:
  - right, crossed silver spade and hoe, on green shield symbolizing farming at that time.
  - left, a black, toothed wheel on silver shield, indicating the importance of industry.

== Sights ==
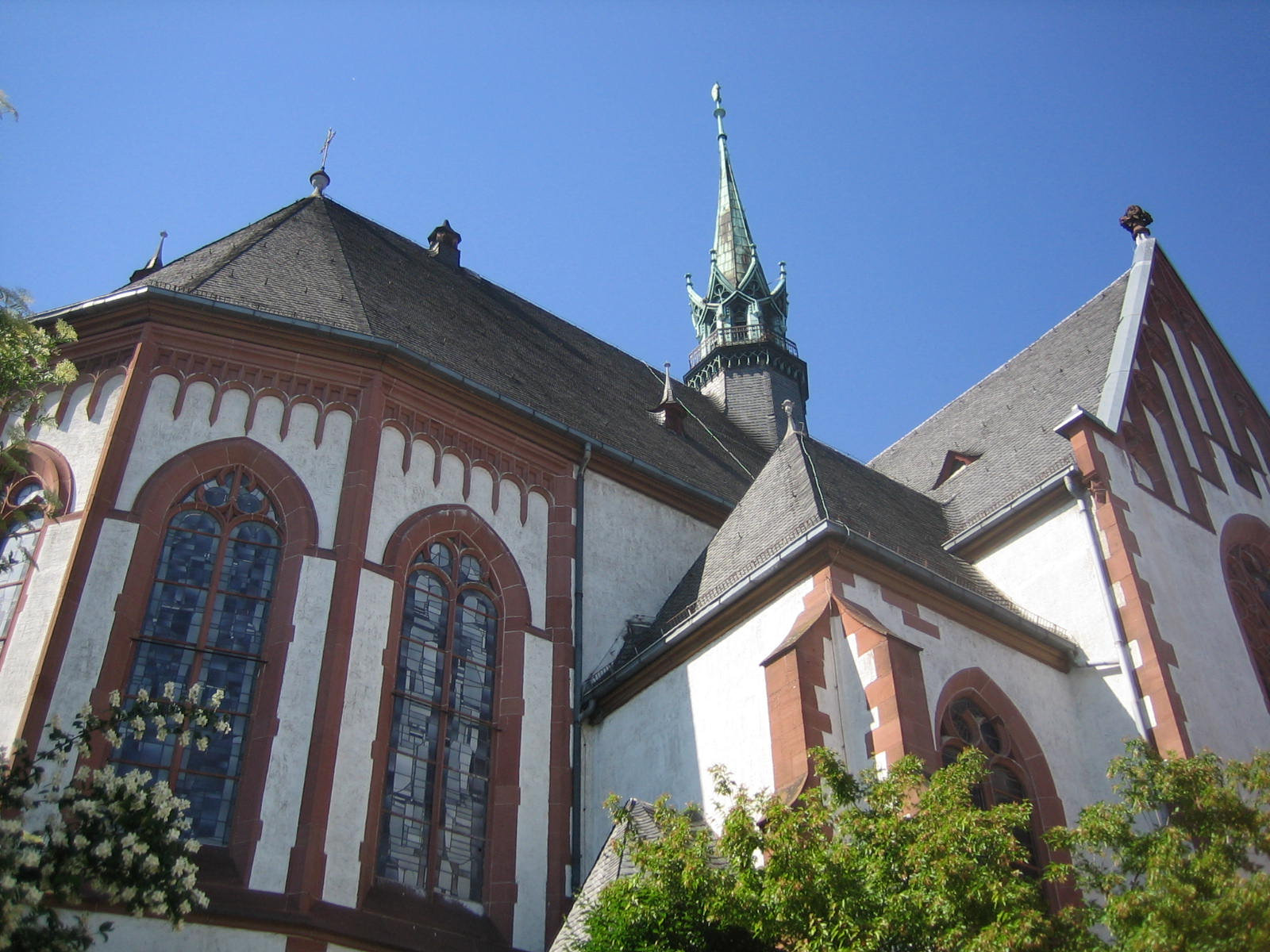
Sacred Heart of Jesus Church

- Historical waterworks (1904)
- House Kleiststraße 30
- House Hauptstraße 47
- Herz-Jesu-Kirche (Sacred Heart Church, Cath., 1911) by Ludwig Becker
- Catholic parish Saint Nicholas (1955)
- Protestant Friedenskirche (Peace Church, 1911)
- historical Protestant house of prayer of 1891
- historical school house with teachers' flats of 1869
- historical Jahn school house (1894)
- Pestalozzi school house (1912)

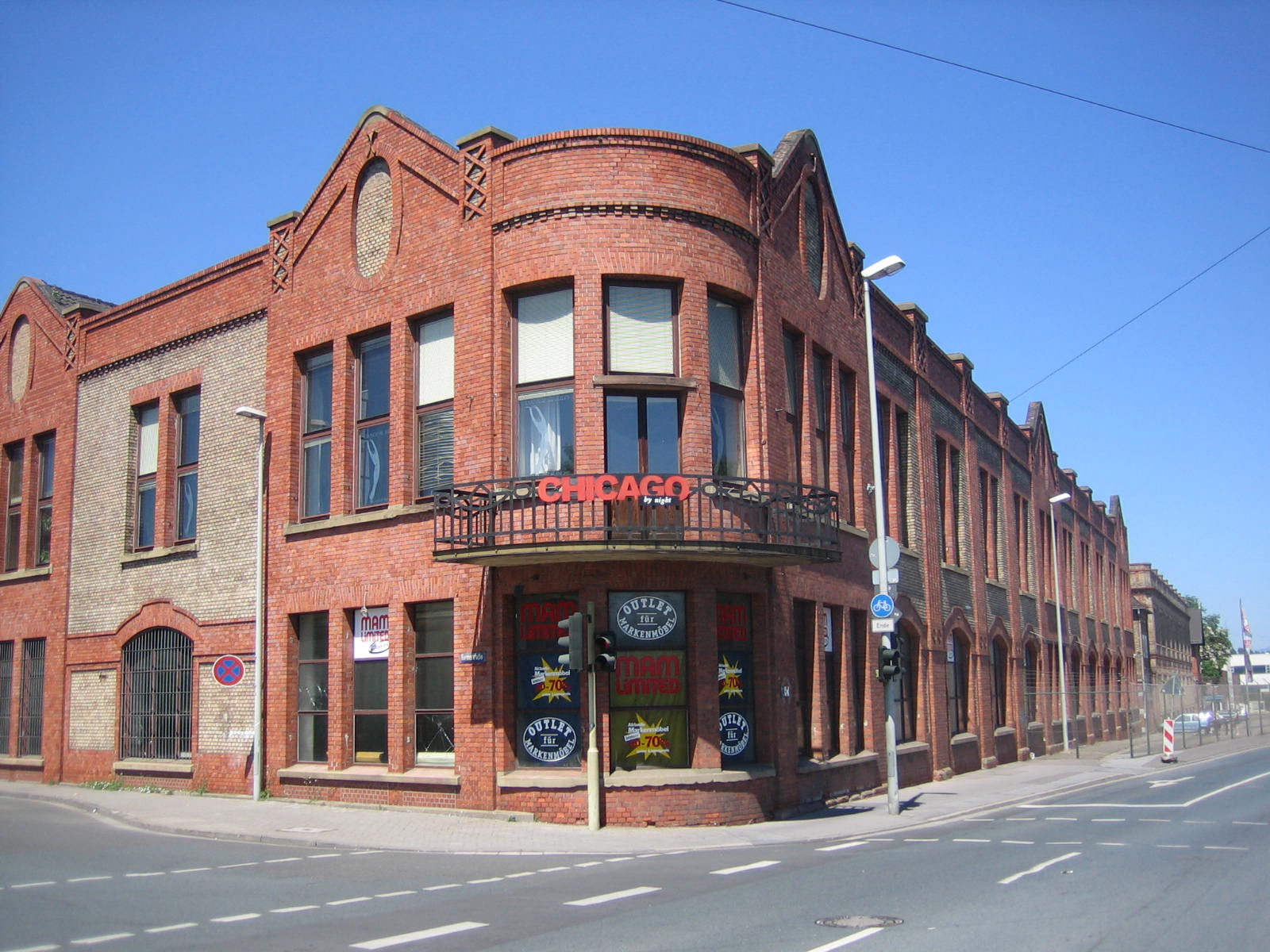
Emperor's balcony at the railroad car factory of the Gastell brothers

- historical hospital of the Gastell brothers, later Rochus hospital, today Caritas-Centre
- historical village museum in the old pump station
- Villa Hänlein
- Eiskeller (old ice storage)
- Municipality (1875)
- industry memorial Waggonfabrik with Halle 45
- Chapel with cross (1814)

== Parks ==
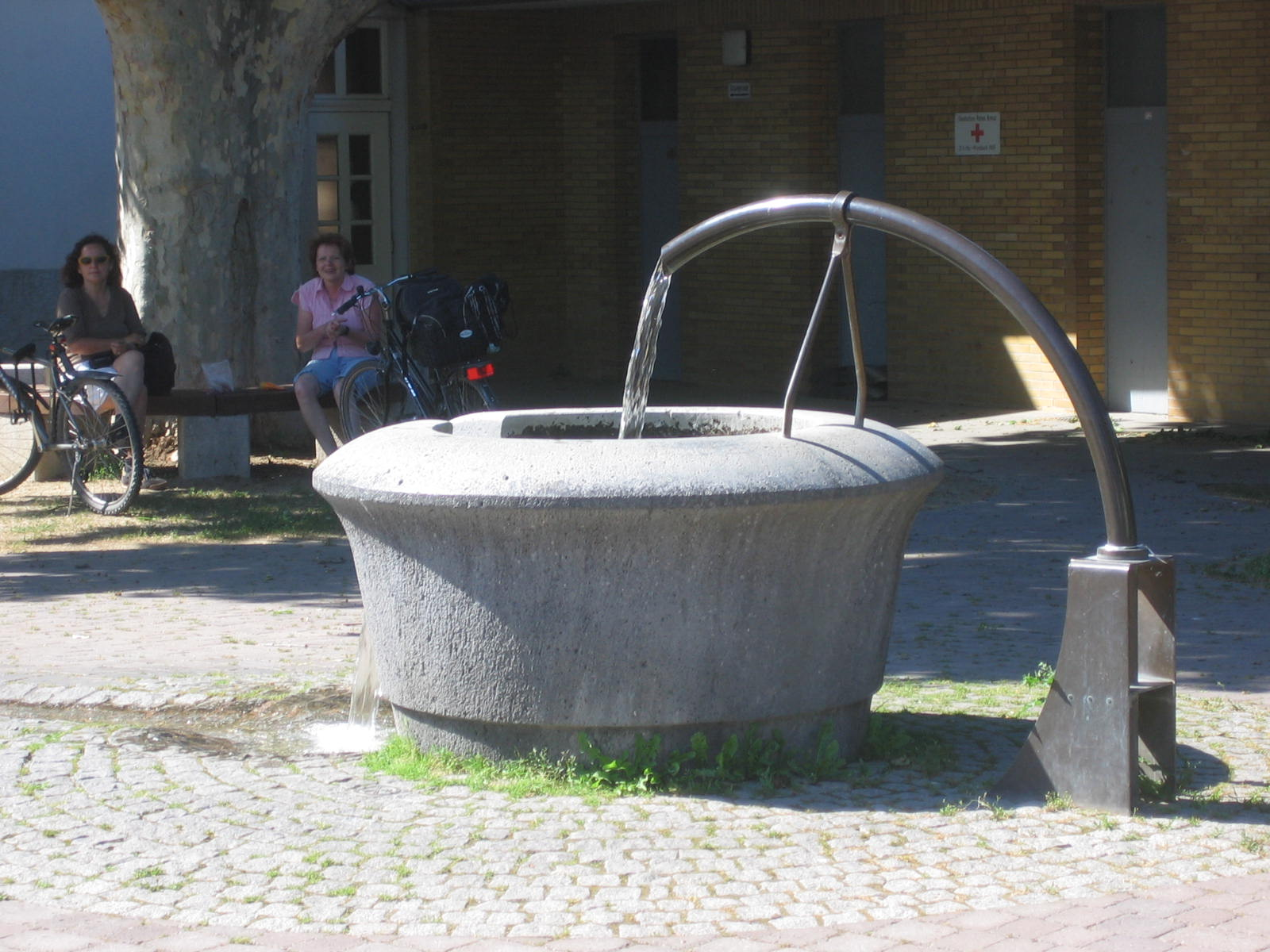
Well at the municipality

- De La Roche Park
- Park in the old cemetery
- Am Mahnes
- Public park Heilig Geist
- Unique nature playing ground of Mainz at Köppelstraße

According to a social study for the town of Mainz, the district Am Westring has the best relation of greenery to housing.

== Nature preserves ==
- Dunes in the Mombach Sand Dunes
- Special Protection Area around the old water works
- Nature preserve between Plantage and Erzbergerstraße

== Prominent people of Mombach ==
- Paul Haenlein, aviation pioneer
- Julius Buckler, First World War fighter ace
- Eduard David first president of the national assembly of the Weimar Republic. Lived between 1898 and 1900 in Mombach.
- Werner Kohlmeyer, German footballer
- Jens Beutel, Lord Mayor of Mainz from 1997 to 2011
- Michael Ebling, Lord Mayor of Mainz from 2012 to 2022, Interior Minister of Rhineland-Palatinate from 2022 to 2026, Minister for Economy, Tourism, Energy, and Climate of Rhineland-Palatinate since 2026

== Transport ==
Mainz-Mombach station is one of two railway stations in the suburb. Due to its central location it is the primary station of the suburb besides the halt “Waggonfabrik”. The station is a part of the West Rhine Railway and borders the Wye: Gleisdreieck Mainz, leading to the Kaiserbrücke (Mainz) and the main station Mainz.

== Economy ==
=== Presence ===
- Ineos Paraform, chemical industry
- lacquer fabrication Albrecht
- dairygold
- RIGA MAINZ GmbH & Co. KG: mobile cranes and heavy transportations
- Kistenpfennig AG: Industry service
