= Hartenberg-Münchfeld =

- Borough of Mainz
- Coat of arms

- Location of Hartenberg-Münchfeld within Mainz
- Interactive map of Hartenberg-Münchfeld
- Location within Germany Location within Rhineland-Palatinate
- Coordinates: 50°0′N 8°14′E
- Country: Germany
- State: Rhineland-Palatinate
- District: Urban district
- City: Mainz

Government
  - Mayor (2019–24): Christin Sauer (Greens)

Area
  - Total: 3.427 km^{2} (1.323 sq mi)

Population (2024)
  - Total: 19,363
  - Density: 5,650/km^{2} (14,630/sq mi)
- Time zone: UTC+01:00 (CET)
  - Summer (DST): UTC+02:00 (CEST)
- Postal codes: 55122
- Dialling codes: 06131
- Website: mainz.de

Hartenberg-Münchfeld is a borough of the Rhineland-Palatinate state capital Mainz, Germany.

Hartenberg-Münchfeld is known for the Bruchwegstadion former home of first league football club of 1. FSV Mainz 05, the state broadcasting house of the Südwestrundfunk for Rhineland-Palatinate, a subsidiary of the Deutsche Bundesbank, formerly: State Central Bank of Rhineland-Palatinate/Saarland, a large vocational school centre, the day-care centre ″Alte Patrone″ with artists' studios. The Taubertsberg town bath and the Peter Cornelius Conservatory are located in the district called "Binger Schlag" near Mainz Hauptbahnhof.

Created in the 1989 reorganisation of Mainz, the borough currently has a population of nearly 19,000 citizens.

Due to its vicinity to the University of Mainz it is one of the favourite student quarters of the town, and many of the city's 35,000 students live there. Famous residents include Nobel Prize Winner Paul J. Crutzen and fashion designer Anja Gockel.

== History ==
The street name "Am Judensand" indicates the use of parts of the later area in the borough from the Middle Ages on. Here are burial places of the Jewish community. The old Jewish cemetery on the border between Hartenberg-Münchfeld and Mainz-Neustadt has been preserved until today; the oldest gravestone dates back to the 11th century. The memorial stone of Gershom ben Judah, who died in 1028 or 1040, is located here.

In the early 19th century, probably more than a thousand people were buried in a mass grave on the territory of the present borough. The mass grave was discovered in autumn 2018 during construction work for a shooting range. According to initial estimates, it could have been German and French soldiers who had fallen victim to an epidemic. Survivors of the Battle of Leipzig in 1813, who had fled to Mainz, had brought the so-called Typhus de Mayence into the city. At least 16292 men of the French occupation and 2485 inhabitants of Mainz died during this time.

Due to the importance of Mainz as a fortified city, the "Hartenberg" also had a military function. Those who controlled it could fire from there to the city centre of Mainz. When the town was extended, a new rampart was built around it, the Rheingauwall. It was built in the Neo-Prussian style of fortification and enclosed parts of what is now the district. Several forts have been partially preserved, such as Fort Hauptstein, the Cavalier Prince Holstein, Fort Hartmühl in Hartenberg Park north of the water features and the New Golden Ross Barracks. At the Mombacher Tor, an army cannery was built at the suggestion of Field Marshal Edwin von Manteuffel, of which only the foundations can be seen today. During the expansion of the Südwestrundfunk in 2003, parts of the Gonsenheimer Tor were rediscovered during excavation work. The parts were salvaged and restored near the site. Extensive parts of Fort Hartenberg, built in the 19th century, including its mining galleries, also came to light when excavation work began on the site of the Hartenberg Primary School (later Peter-Jordan School), which was built around 1965 and demolished in 2018, for a planned residential development in Hartenberg Park. Here, in September 2019, a construction freeze of three months came into effect to allow the archaeologists to survey and document the facilities before they gave way to residential buildings.

The construction of the settlement in Baentschstraße in 1904 marked the beginning of civil housing construction in the borough, which continues until today. In 1928, the Bruchwegstadion was built, where 1 FSV Mainz 05 played its home games until 2011. At the beginning of the 1960s and in the 1970s, massive construction work was carried out on the Hartenberg and Münchfeld and housing was created to alleviate the housing shortage of the post-war period in Mainz city centre.

After the death of Martin Luther King Jr., the city council agreed to the proposal of the city's cultural and school committee to rename the Bruchweg, which was adjacent to the then "Mainz University Housing Area" of the US Army, as Dr.-Martin-Luther-King-Weg. The urban conversion of the "Mainz University Housing Area" brought many apartments for the civilian population of Mainz.

As a result of this development, the former borough Mainz-Innenstadt was dissolved in 1989 and divided into four independent districts. Thus the new district Hartenberg-Münchfeld was created from parts of the borough Mainz-Gonsenheim as well as (east of the Martin-Luther-King-Weg or Am Judensand) the former district city centre. The district consisting of the parts Hartenberg (northeast of the street "An der Allee") and Münchfeld (southwest of it) has not yet found its own identity.
