= Mainz Hauptbahnhof =

Railway station in Mainz, Germany

Mainz Hbf
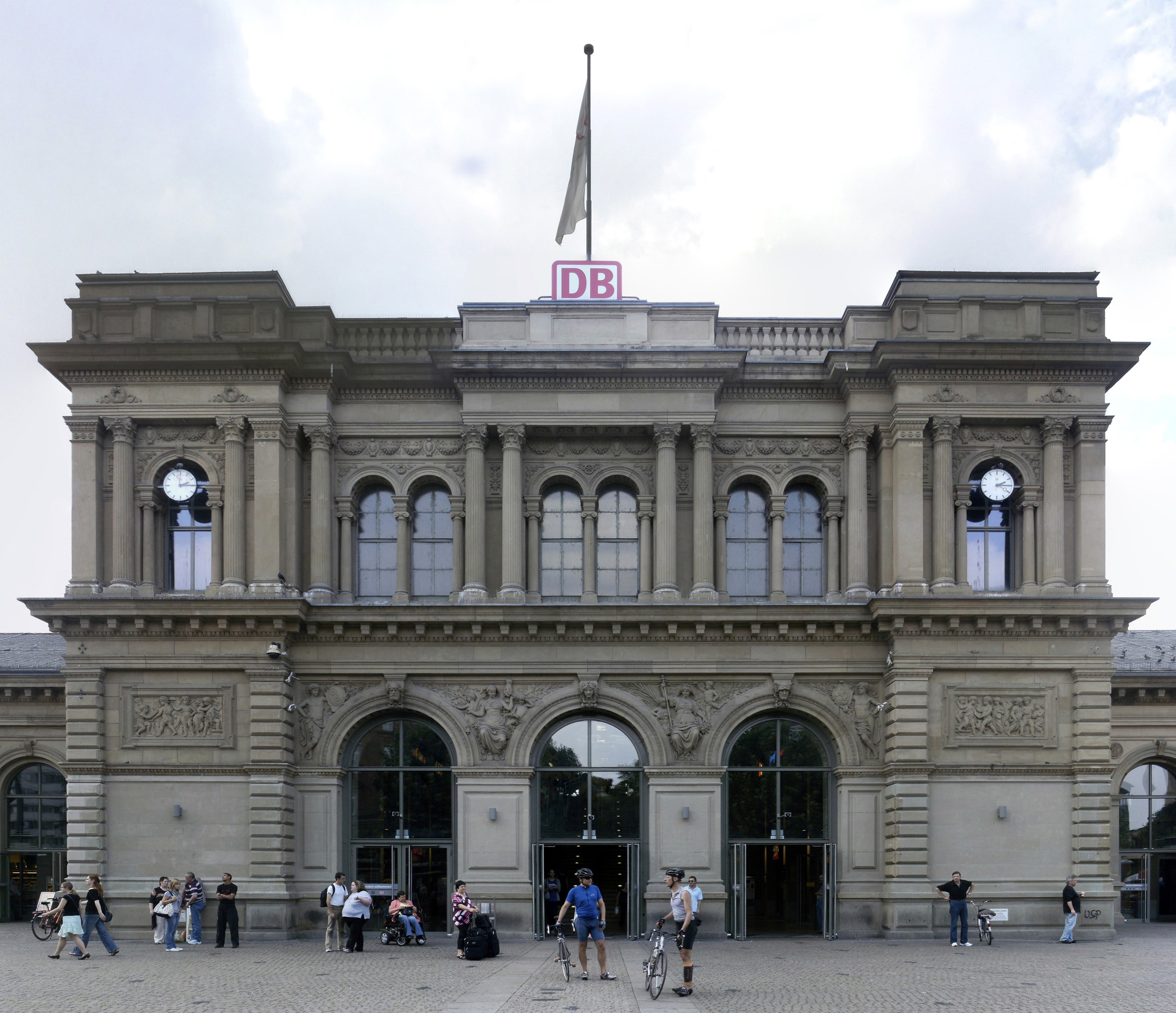
- Front of the station building

General information
- Location: Bahnhofplatz 1, Mainz, Rhineland-Palatinate; Germany
- Coordinates: 50°0′4.67″N 8°15′31.14″E
- Owner: Deutsche Bahn
- Operator: DB Netz; DB Station&Service
- Lines: West Rhine Railway (KBS 470); Rhine-Main Railway (KBS 651); Mainz–Ludwigshafen (KBS 660); Alzey–Mainz (KBS 661)
- Platforms: 9 (1–6, 8, 11, 13)

Construction
- Accessible: Yes

Other information
- Station code: 3898
- DS100 code: FMZ
- IBNR: 8000240
- Category: 2
- Fare zone: : 6511; RNN: 300 (RMV transitional tariff)
- Website: www.bahnhof.de

Passengers
- 60,000 daily
Services
| Preceding station | DB Fernverkehr | Following station |
|---|---|---|
| Bingen (Rhein) Hbf towards Hamburg-Altona | ICE 1 Sprinter | Frankfurt Airport towards Passau Hbf |
| Wiesbaden Hbf One-way operation | ICE 11 | Worms Hbf towards München Hbf |
| Wiesbaden Hbf One-way operation | ICE/ECE 20 | Frankfurt Airport towards Hamburg Hbf |
| Bingen (Rhein) Hbf towards Norddeich Mole | IC 35 | Worms Hbf towards Konstanz |
| Wiesbaden Hbf towards Köln Hbf | ICE 45 | Mannheim Hbf towards Stuttgart Hbf or Frankfurt (Main) Hbf |
| Koblenz Hbf towards Dresden Hbf | IC 55 | Mannheim Hbf towards Stuttgart Hbf |
| Koblenz Hbf towards Dortmund Hbf | IC 55 Allgäu | Mannheim Hbf towards Oberstdorf |
| Wiesbaden Hbf One-way operation | ICE 89 | Mannheim Hbf towards St. Anton am Arlberg |
| Koblenz Hbf towards Dortmund Hbf | ICE 91 | Frankfurt Airport towards Wien Hbf |
| Preceding station | DB Regio Mitte | Following station |
| Ingelheim towards Koblenz Hbf | RE 2 Südwest-Express | Mainz Römisches Theater towards Frankfurt (Main) Hbf |
| Hochheim towards Frankfurt (Main) Hbf | RE 4 | Worms Hbf towards Karlsruhe Hbf |
| Hochheim towards Frankfurt (Main) Hbf | RE 14 Südwest-Express | Worms Hbf towards Mannheim Hbf |
| Preceding station | Vlexx | Following station |
| Ingelheim towards Saarbrücken Hbf | RE 3 | Mainz Römisches Theater towards Frankfurt (Main) Hbf |
| Nieder-Olm towards Kirchheimbolanden | RE 13 | Terminus |
| Ingelheim towards Kaiserslautern Hbf | RE 15 selected trains only | Mainz Römisches Theater towards Bodenheim |
| Mainz-Waggonfabrik towards Kirchheimbolanden | RB 31 selected trains only | through to RB 44 |
| Mainz-Waggonfabrik towards Kirchheimbolanden | RB 31 | Terminus |
| Heidesheim towards Neubrücke (Nahe) | RB 33 | Wiesbaden Ost towards Wiesbaden Hbf |
| Terminus | RB 44 selected trains only | Mainz Römisches Theater towards Worms Hbf |
| Preceding station | Hessische Landesbahn | Following station |
| Wiesbaden Hbf Terminus | RB 75 | Mainz Römisches Theater towards Aschaffenburg Hbf |
| Preceding station | Trans Regio | Following station |
| Mainz-Mombach towards Köln Messe/Deutz | RB 26 | Terminus |
| Preceding station | Rhine-Main S-Bahn | Following station |
| Mainz Nord towards Wiesbaden Hbf | S8 (Rhine-Main S-Bahn) | Mainz Römisches Theater towards Hanau Hbf |
| Preceding station | Rhine-Neckar S-Bahn | Following station |
| Terminus | S6 | Mainz Römisches Theater towards Bensheim |
Location

Mainz Hauptbahnhof ("Mainz main station", formerly known as Centralbahnhof Mainz) is a railway station for the city of Mainz in the German state of Rhineland-Palatinate. It is used by about 60,000 travelers and visitors each day and is therefore by far the busiest station in Rhineland-Palatinate. The station was a trial area for a CCTV scheme using automated face recognition.

== History ==
The current station was built as a central station from 1882 to 1884 according to the plans of Philipp Johann Berdellé (1838–1903) as part of the expansion of the city after the Franco-Prussian War.

=== Origins ===
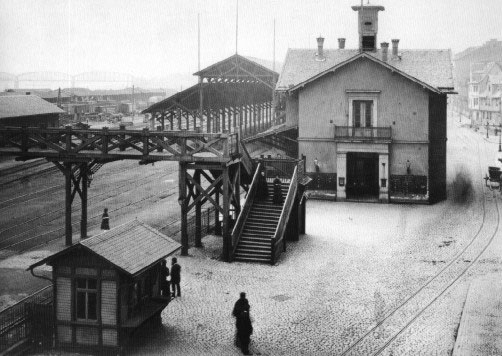
Former station on the Rheinstraße

Under the Rheinschifffahrtsakte (Rhine navigation treaty) of 1831, Mainz lost its right to impose a stapelrecht (pile right, a medieval right apparently first granted by Charlemagne to some cities, including Mainz, to require river traders to unload goods in its marketplace for a specified number of days and offer them for sale or make payment in lieu) and thus its trading port and its high tariffs could be avoided. On 13 April 1840 the Taunus Railway between Frankfurt, Mainz-Kastel and Wiesbaden was opened and took transit traffic and tourism away from Mainz. On the other hand, Mainz was the largest city of the Grand Duchy of Hesse and was thus an attractive destination for the developing railway network. In Mainz, the local Hessian Ludwig Railway Company (Hessische Ludwigsbahn) obtained concessions to build railway lines from Mainz, beginning in 1845 with the Mainz–Ludwigshafen railway, on which construction began in 1847. The completion of the line was delayed due to the Revolutions of 1848 to 23 March 1853. The original Mainz station was built on land next to the Rhine outside the city wall between the Wood Tower, Fort Malakoff and today's Museum of Ancient Seafaring, and opened in August 1853.

In December 1858 the Hessian Ludwig Railway opened a line to Aschaffenburg via the then state capital of Darmstadt, but it ended on the right Rhine bank above the Main delta as no bridge had been built over the Rhine. Travelers had to cross the Rhine with their luggage on a train ferry. Therefore, in 1860 the building of a permanent railway bridge began, which went into service on 20 December 1862 as the first permanent bridge over the Rhine at Mainz since Roman times.

On 17 October 1859 the Mainz-Bingen line opened from its own terminal station in Mainz, which was outside the Mainz fortress in the Gartenfeld ("garden field") (now Neustadt) between the Frauenlobstraße and Feldbergplatz, near where today's Grüne Brücke crosses Rheinallee.

In 1871 the Alzey–Mainz line of the Hessian Ludwig Railway opened to Alzey via Gonsenheim.

=== Planning ===
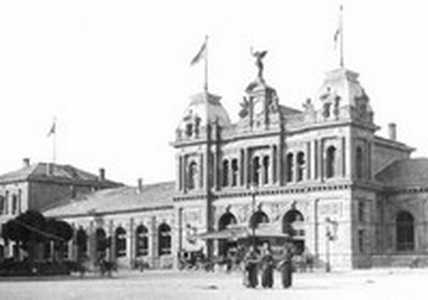
Berdellé's station

In the course of the 19th Century the number of passengers steadily increased, as Mainz developed as the junction of lines to Darmstadt, Ludwigshafen, Aschaffenburg, Bingen and Frankfurt. However, the terminal stations lay between the walls and the fortress and the Rhine bank, and this limited area did not permit an expansion of the railway facilities. Already in 1858 the Mainzer Zeitung newspaper reported plans for a relocation of the stations.

The development of the town, extension and organization of the riverbank and railway development required a high measure of co-ordination in order to produce an acceptable outcome. In 1873, Chief architect Eduard Kreyßig, who had replaced the former chief architect Laske in 1866, suggested shifting the station to the west side of the city. The approach lines had to be built in a large curve to the west of the city to reach the proposed station site. In addition a tunnel under the citadel was necessary.

=== Construction ===
The Mainz architect Philipp Johann Berdellé (1838–1903) created the station's entrance building in bright Flonheim sandstone in Italian neo-Renaissance with baroque and neoclassical elements. A jutting central section is framed by two lower side wings with arcades, which end in risalits. The building was opened ceremoniously on 15 October 1884.

==== Art in the building ====
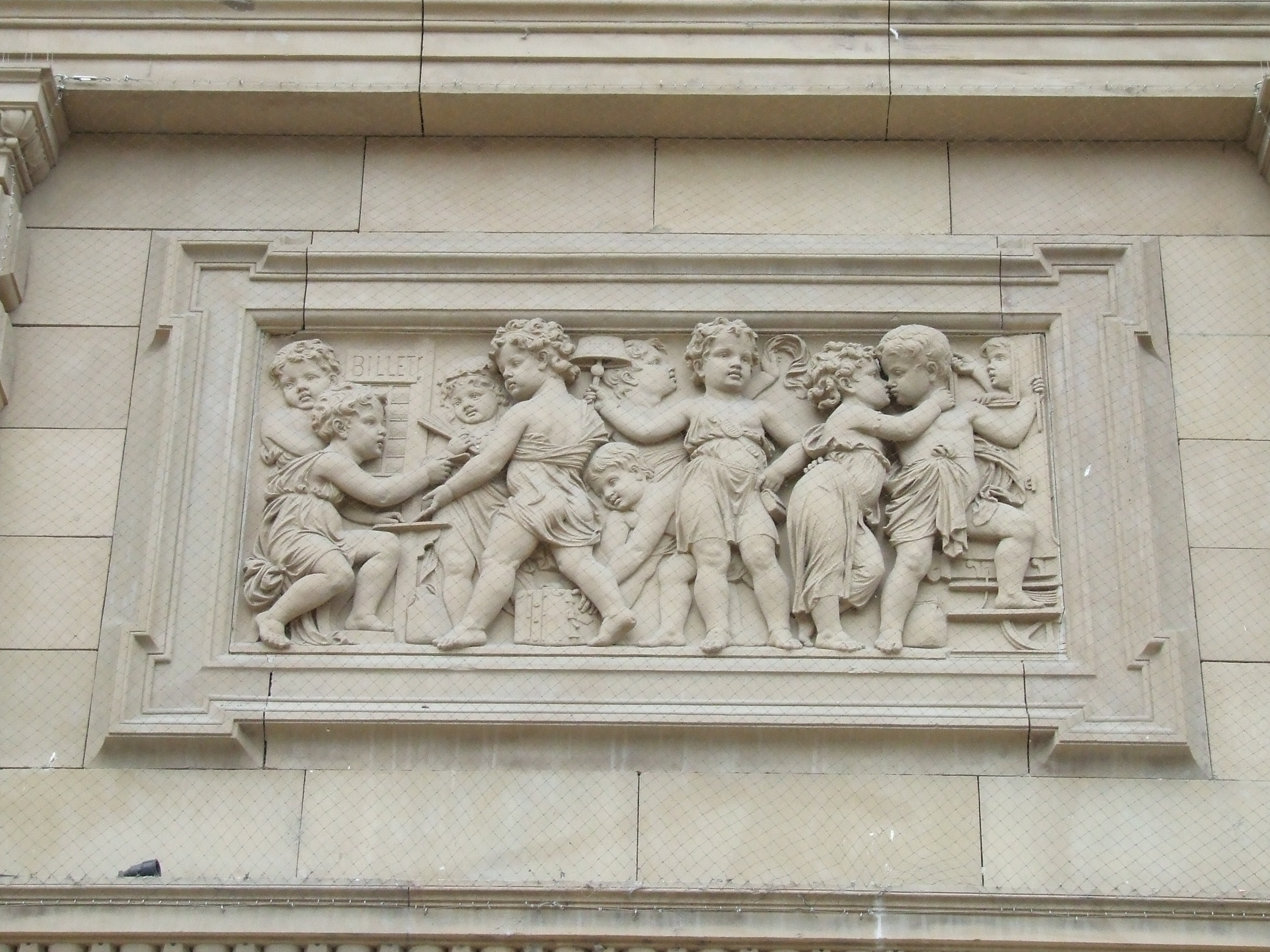
Departures.

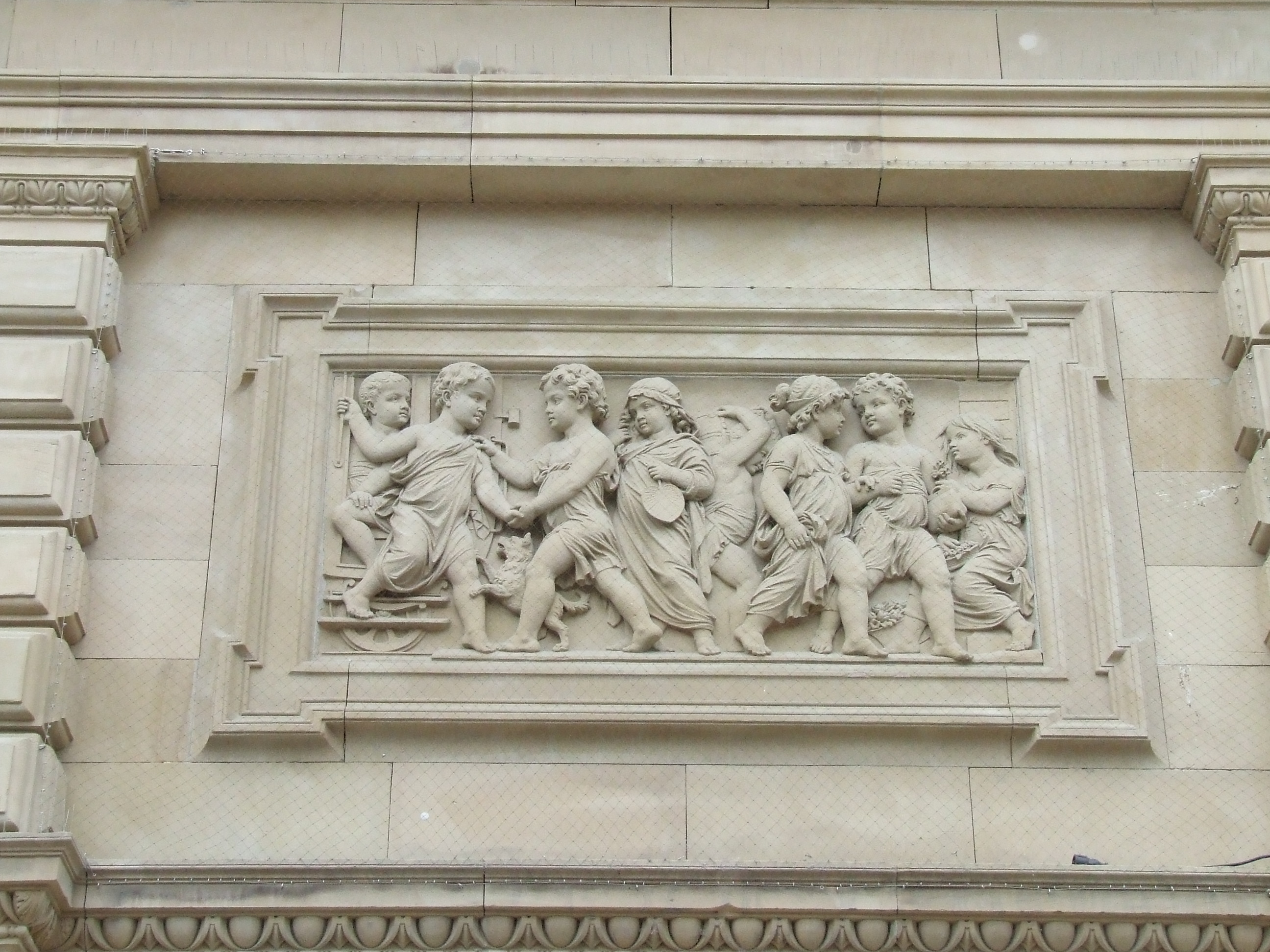
Arrivals.

Berdellé set the emphasis of the graphic decorations on the entrances of the central building. Allegorical representations refer to the function of the building. On both sides of the entrance reliefs (produced by the Mainz sculptors Valentin Barth and Anton Scholl) display putti at play to indicate the way for arrivals and departures:

- The departure sculpture is in the left section of the main building: in the left upper corner the word "billet" (ticket) can be recognized. It shows scenes on the topic of departure and parting at the station and includes a heavy suitcase.
- The arrival sculpture is in the right section of the main building: here the putti disembark from the train and joyful arrival is portrayed. The heavy suitcase is carried away.

=== Station forecourt ===
Originally the forecourt surrounded a rondel and was planted with trees, lawns and flowers. It included a rail loop for horse trams and numerous carriages and hotel buses also served the station.

=== Station hall ===
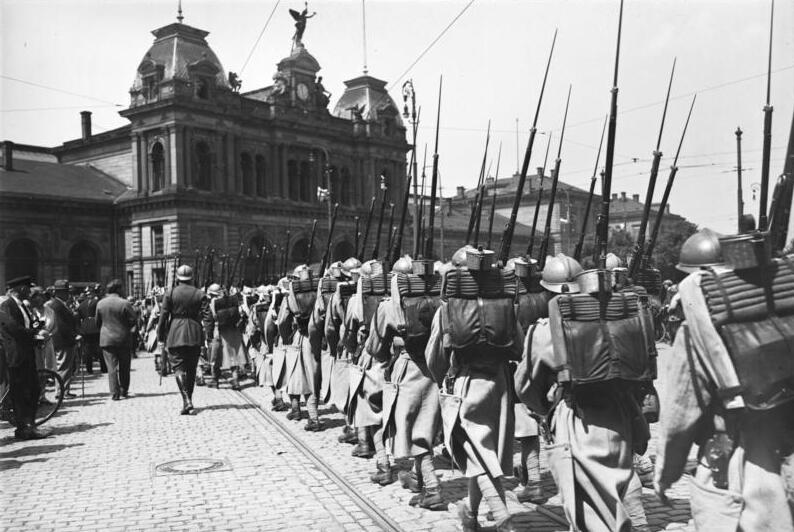
French troops leaving Mainz on 30 June 1930

The station hall was the longest in Europe when opened. It was built, along with railway bridge over the Rhine, by the Süddeutschen Brückenbau-Actien-Gesellschaft, now MAN AG. It was three hundred meters long and 47 meters wide and constructed from cast and wrought iron, glass and corrugated iron with a surface area of approximately 14,000 square meters. The roof structure was supported by sixty wrought-iron columns. The faces were locked with glass aprons up to the entry height of the courses.

=== First alteration ===
Part of the tunnel between the Hauptbahnhof and Mainz Süd was opened to the surface in the thirties in a make-work scheme, creating two tunnels. A fire in the station's roof on 23 December 1934 caused limited damage, but it was decided to replace the whole roof. The station was bombed on many occasions during World War II by the Royal Air Force and the United States Army Air Forces, but continued to operate.

=== Second alteration ===
In the course of the bombing of Mainz in World War II the Hauptbahnhof as important infrastructure was subject to several air raids. With the permission of the American and French military authorities trains began to operate on individual lines again and reconstruction began before the end of 1945. The re-building of the station building and forecourt began in 1947. The outside walls and the basic concept were maintained, but the groundplan was improved.

The Hauptbahnhof was enlarged, modernized and adapted for technical progress. The Mainz locomotive shed became one of the first to be "steam-free", when the last steam locomotive left it in 1959. The station had previously been electrified.

=== Third alteration ===
The largest recent change to the station is the building of a second double-track tunnel on the line to Römisches Theater station (formerly Mainz Süd) under the Kästrich. The reorganization of the lines in the old tunnel has not been finished yet.

At a cost of about € 114 million over a five-year construction period to the end of 2003, the reception building and the station hall were reconditioned and partly rebuilt. The platform entrance now leads across a high ramp, which gives step-free access via escalators and elevators from the reception hall to the platforms. It spans four platforms and seven tracks. Three further terminal tracks are accessible from platform 1. The area for businesses and restaurants was expanded by 3.800 m².

== Services ==
The station is used by about 55,000 travelers each day. It is the terminus of Line S8:Wiesbaden Hbf–Mainz Hbf–Rüsselsheim–Frankfurt Hbf–Hanau Hbf; of the Rhine-Main S-Bahn and it is the start of the Mainbahn to Frankfurt Hbf. It is served by 440 daily local and regional trains (StadtExpress, RE and RB) and 78 long-distance trains (IC, EC and ICE).

The station is an interchange point for the Mainz tramway network, and an important bus junction for the city and region (RNN, ORN and MVG).

=== Long distance ===
In the 2026 timetable, the following services stop at the station:

| Line | Route | Interval |
|---|---|---|
| ICE 1 | Hamburg-Altona – Hamburg – Essen – Duisburg – Düsseldorf – Cologne – Bonn – Koblenz – Mainz – Frankfurt Airport – Frankfurt – Würzburg – Nuremberg – Regensburg – Passau | Two train pairs |
| ICE 11 | Wiesbaden – Mainz – Mannheim – Stuttgart – Ulm – Augsburg – München-Pasing – Munich | 1 train |
| ICE/ECE 20 | Kiel – Hamburg – Hannover – Göttingen – Kassel-Wilhelmshöhe – Frankfurt – Frankfurt Airport – Mainz – Wiesbaden | 1 train |
| IC 35 | Norddeich Mole – Münster – Recklinghausen – Gelsenkirchen – Oberhausen – Duisburg – Düsseldorf – Cologne – Koblenz – Mainz – Mannheim – Karlsruhe – Offenburg – Konstanz | Some trains on the weekend |
| ICE 41 | Munich – Nuremberg – Würzburg – Fulda – Kassel-Wilhelmshöhe – Hamm – Dortmund – Essen – Duisburg – Köln Messe/Deutz – Wiesbaden – Mainz – Frankfurt Airport – Frankfurt | 1 train (Mon–Fri) |
| ICE 42 | Munich – Augsburg – Ulm – Stuttgart – Mannheim – Frankfurt Airport – Mainz – Wiesbaden | 1 train (Sun) |
| ICE 45 | Stuttgart (– Vaihingen) – Heidelberg – Mannheim – Mainz – Wiesbaden – Limburg Süd – Montabaur – Siegburg/Bonn (– Cologne/Bonn Airport) – Cologne | 1 train pair |
| ICE 45 | Mainz – Wiesbaden – Limburg Süd – Montabaur – Cologne | 1 train |
| ICE 50 | Dresden – Leipzig – Erfurt – Fulda – Frankfurt – Frankfurt Airport – Mainz – Wiesbaden | Every 2 hours |
| IC 55 | Dresden – Leipzig – Halle – Magdeburg – Braunschweig – Hanover – Bielefeld – Dortmund – Hagen – Wuppertal – Solingen – Cologne – Bonn – Koblenz – Mainz – Mannheim – Heidelberg – Vaihingen – Stuttgart (– Reutlingen – Tübingen) | Every 2 hours |
| IC 55 | Dortmund – Essen – Düsseldorf – Cologne – Bonn – Koblenz – Mainz – Mannheim – Heidelberg – Stuttgart – Ulm – Oberstdorf | 1 train pair |
| ICE 91 | Dortmund – Duisburg – Düsseldorf – Cologne – Koblenz – Mainz – Frankfurt – Würzburg – Nuremberg – Regensburg – Passau – Linz – Vienna | Every 2 hours |

=== Regional ===
In the 2026 timetable, the following local passenger stop at the station:

| Line | Route | Operator | Stock |
|---|---|---|---|
| S6 | Mainz – Mainz Römisches Theater – Oppenheim – Worms – Bobenheim-Roxheim – Frankenthal – Ludwigshafen – Mannheim (– Weinheim – Bensheim) | DB Regio Mitte | 425 |
| S8 (Rhine-Main S-Bahn) | Wiesbaden Hbf – Wiesbaden Ost – Mainz Nord – Mainz Hbf – Mainz Römisches Theater – Mainz-Gustavsburg – Mainz-Bischofsheim – Rüsselsheim Opelwerk – Rüsselsheim – Raunheim – Kelsterbach – Frankfurt Airport – Frankfurt am Main Stadion – Frankfurt-Niederrad – Frankfurt (Main) Hbf tief – Frankfurt (Main) Taunusanlage – Frankfurt (Main) Hauptwache – Frankfurt (Main) Konstablerwache – Frankfurt (Main) Ostendstraße – Frankfurt (Main) Mühlberg – Offenbach-Kaiserlei – Offenbach Ledermuseum – Offenbach Marktplatz – Offenbach (Main) Ost (– Mühlheim (Main) – Mühlheim (Main) Dietesheim – Steinheim (Main) – Hanau Hbf) | DB Regio Mitte | 430 |
| RE 2 | Koblenz – Boppard – Oberwesel – Bingen – Ingelheim – Mainz – Rüsselsheim – Frankfurt Airport – Frankfurt | DB Regio Mitte | 429 |
| RE 3 | Saarbrücken – Türkismühle – Idar-Oberstein – Bad Kreuznach – Mainz – Rüsselsheim – Frankfurt Airport – Frankfurt | vlexx | 620, 622 |
| RE 4 | Frankfurt – Frankfurt-Höchst – Hochheim – Mainz – Worms – Frankenthal – Ludwigshafen – Germersheim – Karlsruhe | DB Regio Mitte | 429 |
| RE 13 | Mainz – Nieder-Olm – Saulheim – Wörrstadt – Armsheim – Alzey (– Wahlheim – Freimersheim – Kirchheimbolanden) | vlexx | 620, 622 |
| RE 14 | Frankfurt – Frankfurt-Höchst – Hochheim – Mainz – Worms – Frankenthal – Ludwigshafen Mitte – Mannheim | DB Regio Mitte | 429 |
| RE 15 | Mainz – Bad Kreuznach – Hochspeyer – Kaiserslautern | vlexx | 620,622 |
| RB 26 | Köln Messe/Deutz – Köln – Bonn – Remagen – Andernach – Koblenz – Boppard – Oberwesel – Bingen – Ingelheim – Mainz | Trans regio | 460 |
| RB 31 | (Frankfurt – Frankfurt Flughafen – Rüsselsheim –) Mainz – Gonsenheim – Klein Winternheim-Ober Olm – Nieder-Olm – Saulheim – Wörrstadt – Armsheim – Albig – Alzey (– Wahlheim – Freimersheim – Kirchheimbolanden) | vlexx | 620, 622 |
| RB 33 | Idar-Oberstein – Bad Kreuznach – Mainz (– Rüsselsheim – Frankfurt Airport – Frankfurt) | vlexx | 620, 622 |
| RB 75 | Wiesbaden – Mainz – Groß-Gerau – Darmstadt – Dieburg – Aschaffenburg | Hessische Landesbahn | 1440 |

In brief
| Number of passenger tracks above ground: | 7 main line, 1 branch, 1 tramway station, 2 tracks each |
| Trains (daily): | 78 long-distance 440 regional |

== See also ==
- Rail transport in Germany
- Railway stations in Germany
