= Mainz-Laubenheim station =

Railway station in Mainz, Germany

Mainz-Laubenheim
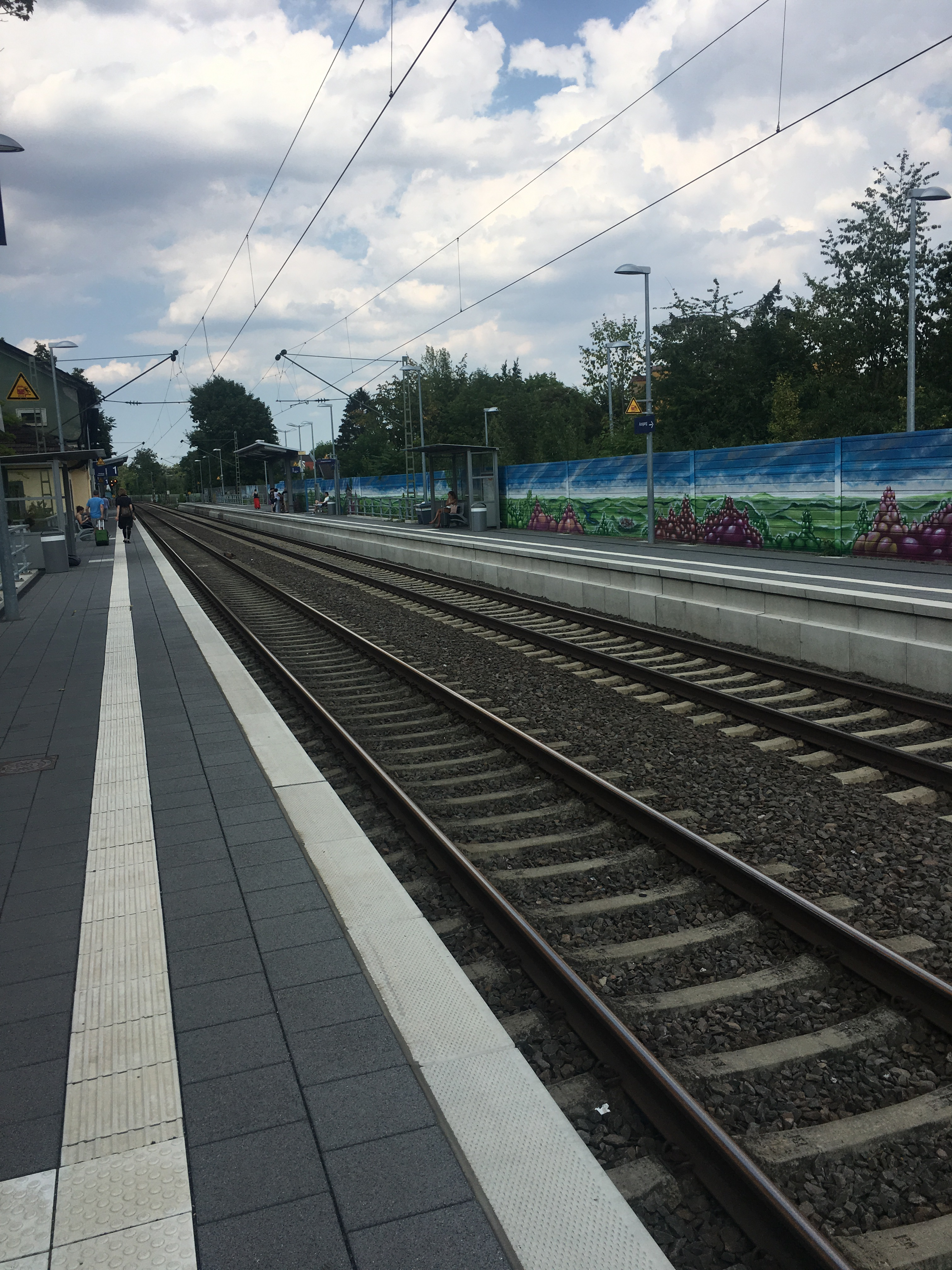
- 2018

General information
- Location: Rheintalstraße; 55130 Mainz-Laubenheim; Rhineland-Palatinate; Germany
- Coordinates: 49.9612°N 8.3140°E
- System: Hp
- Owner: Deutsche Bahn
- Operator: DB Station&Service
- Lines: Mainz–Ludwigshafen railway (KBS 660)
- Platforms: 2 side platforms
- Tracks: 2
- Train operators: S-Bahn RheinNeckar; vlexx
- Connections: 64 76 80 81 90

Construction
- Parking: yes
- Cycle facilities: yes
- Accessible: yes

Other information
- Station code: 3905
- DS100 code: FML
- IBNR: 8003819
- Category: 5
- Fare zone: : 6511; RNN: 300 (RMV transitional tariff)
- Website: www.bahnhof.de

Services
Preceding station	Vlexx	Following station
Mainz Römisches Theater towards Kaiserslautern Hbf	RE 15 selected trains only	Bodenheim Terminus
Mainz Römisches Theater towards Mainz Hbf	RB 44 selected trains only	Bodenheim towards Worms Hbf
Preceding station	Rhine-Neckar S-Bahn	Following station
Mainz Römisches Theater towards Mainz Hbf	S6	Bodenheim towards Bensheim
Location
- Location within Rhineland-Palatinate Location within Germany Location within Europe

Mainz-Laubenheim station (German: Haltepunkt Mainz-Laubenheim) is a railway station in the municipality of Mainz, Rhineland-Palatinate, Germany.
