= Mainz-Gustavsburg station =

Railway station in Ginsheim-Gustavsburg, Germany

Mainz Gustavsburg
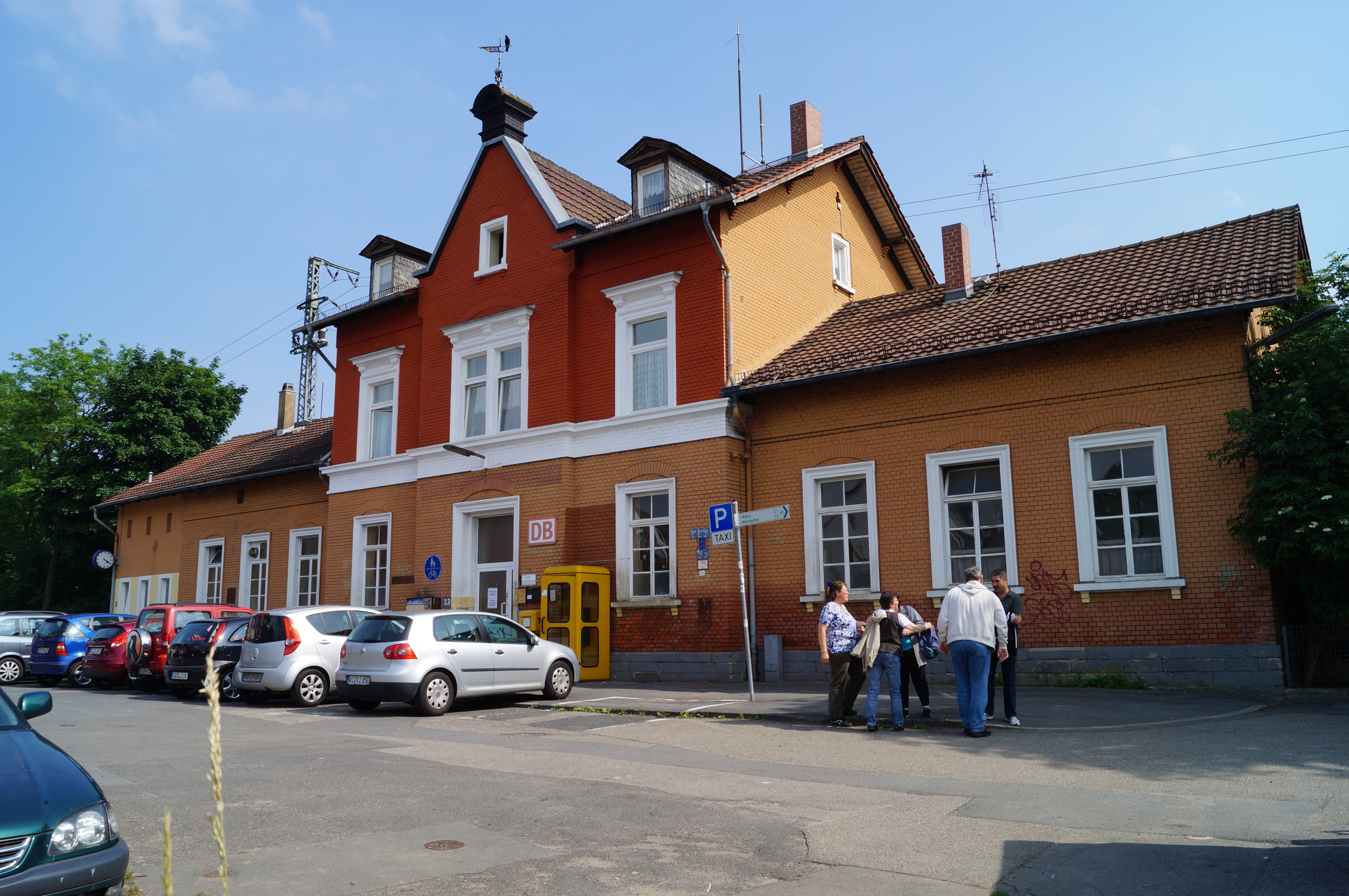

General information
- Location: Ginsheim-Gustavsburg, Hesse; Germany
- Coordinates: 49°59′40″N 8°18′51″E
- Owner: DB Netz
- Operator: DB Station&Service
- Lines: Mainz–Darmstadt–Aschaffenburg (KBS 651); Mainz–Frankfurt (KBS 645.8/645.9/655)
- Platforms: 2
- Train operators: S-Bahn Rhein-Main

Other information
- Station code: n/a
- DS100 code: FMG
- Category: 5
- Fare zone: : 6560; RNN: 300 (RMV transitional tariff)
- Website: www.bahnhof.de

History
- Opened: 1888

Services
Preceding station	Hessische Landesbahn	Following station
Mainz Römisches Theater towards Wiesbaden Hbf	RB 75	Mainz-Bischofsheim towards Aschaffenburg Hbf
Preceding station	Rhine-Main S-Bahn	Following station
Mainz Römisches Theater towards Wiesbaden Hbf	S8 (Rhine-Main S-Bahn)	Mainz-Bischofsheim towards Hanau Hbf
Location
- Location within Hesse

Mainz-Gustavsburg station is the station of the town of Ginsheim-Gustavsburg in the German state of Hesse on the Main Railway from Mainz to Frankfurt am Main. It is classified by Deutsche Bahn as a category 5 station. The station is served by the S-Bahn and some regional trains. The station was opened at its current location in 1858.

Between 1930 and 1945, Gustavsburg was a district of the city of Mainz and, as a result, the station was renamed Mainz-Gustavsburg. In 1945, the American and French occupying authorities transferred Gustavsburg to American administration and several months later it became part of the new state of Hesse. Although Gustavsburg became a self-governing municipality again as a result, the station is still called Mainz-Gustavsburg.

== Rail operations ==
Gustavsburg lies in the area served by the Rhein-Main-Verkehrsverbund (Rhine-Main Transport Association, RMV). It is served by Rhine-Main S-Bahn trains operated by DB Regio. Services on line S8 operate at 30-minute intervals on the Wiesbaden Hauptbahnhof–Hanau Hauptbahnhof route.

Gustavsburg station is also served by a Regionalbahn service between Wiesbaden and Aschaffenburg. These trains call at the station only during rush hours; at other times, they pass through without stopping.
