= Lee Barracks =

The Lee Barracks were military barracks in Mainz, Germany. It was named after United States Army Captain Robert Elward Lee (1920–1945), who as a first lieutenant had performed a particularly courageous mission on November 17, 1944 (General Order October 11, 1956) during World War II. It was often mistakenly assumed that the barracks was named after the 19th century general of the Army of Northern Virginia Robert Edward Lee. Today, large parts of the Mainz-Gonsenheim district are located on the property.

== Namesake ==
Robert Elward Lee, a former football player at the University of Arizona was in the 67th Armored Regiment in 1944 fighting on the French-Belgian border in the area that was developing as Hitler's last offensive which became known as the Battle of the Bulge. He received a Distinguished Service Cross, which read:

First Lieutenant (Armor) Robert E. Lee, United States Army, was awarded the Distinguished Service Cross (Posthumously) for extraordinary heroism in connection with military operations against an armed enemy while serving with the 67th Armored Regiment, in action against enemy forces on 17 November 1944. First Lieutenant Lee's intrepid actions, personal bravery and zealous devotion to duty at the cost of his life, exemplify the highest traditions of the military forces of the United States and reflect great credit upon himself, his unit, and the United States Army.

== History ==
The construction of the barracks was begun after the remilitarization of the Rhineland (1936) in 1937/38 in the course of the German re-armament in the demilitarized zone established by the peace treaty of Versailles for the security of France and named after Hugo von Kathen, the last military governor of the fortress of Mainz. Responsible was the Wehrkreisverwaltung XII in Wiesbaden, which ran the process together with Robert Barth, the National Socialist mayor of Mainz.

The 29-hectare site belonged partially to the Mombach district and partly to the Gonsenheim district. Mombach had already been incorporated to Mainz in 1907, and in 1937 the then independent community of Gonsenheim was faced with the choice of either paying the development costs for the garrison's new barracks or being incorporated. "Gonsenheim new developments, close to the city limits and thus far from the town centre, would have to be supplied with electricity, gas and water from Mainz." On April 1, 1938, the city of Mainz incorporated the site by enforcement.

The completed barracks were occupied by the Field Artillery Regiment 72. A commemorative plaque on the officer's building commemorates the foot artillery regiment "General-Feldzeugmeister" (Brandenburg's) No. 3. In the course of the bombing of Mainz in World War II, the area was bombed several times during the following war.

On March 22, 1945 the war was over for Mainz, American troops had the city under control. With the city commander Louis Théodore Kleinmann, the French occupying power took over the city on July 9. In the same month, the Reichsbauamt Mainz was commissioned by the French administration to repair the Kathen barracks. After the repair, the French military authorities took over the barracks and named it after General Charles Mangin, who after the First World War was commander-in-chief of the French occupying army on the Rhine based in Mainz. Even today, the lettering "Caserne Mangin" on the main gate reminds us of the name. Gottfried Lenzen, the director of the military construction office in Mainz, was entrusted with the execution of the construction tasks for the occupying troops.

In 1949, US armed forces took over the Kathen barracks, which was subsequently given the name "Lee Barracks". American soldiers, their families and their housing estates, NCO Club, ballpark, Bowling Alley and the Panzerwerk on the border to Mombach shaped the Gonsenheim townscape for the next decades. The Mainz Sand Dunes were again used for military exercises. With the fall of communism in the cause of the Peaceful Revolution in the GDR in 1989, the need for large units of mechanized forces in Germany no longer existed. The 8th US Infantry Division was needed during Operation Desert Shield / Desert Storm and large parts, including the Ready First Combat Team, were deployed in the Middle East.

The 8th US Infantry Division was inactivated at a solemn ceremony in Bad Kreuznach on 17 January 1992, and the American contingent withdrew from Mainz. The area became a conversion area.

== Present ==
A district of Gonsenheim was built on the site, whereby some buildings of the barracks were renovated and rebuilt. In 1993, the former officer's building at Canisiusstraße 27-31 in Gonsenheim was converted into a 220-room student residence of the Studierendenwerk Mainz. After the dormitory premises and buildings were sold to a housing association, the student residence was dissolved and vacated in mid-2011.

During the first construction phase, a project community with several property developers - including Wohnbau Mainz - built around 800 residential units in which almost 2000 people live. Most of the buildings were multi-family and terraced houses. An approximately 2.3 ha large district park at Willy-Brandt-Platz, the former drill ground, was laid out as the green centre of the residential area. More than 200 apartments with a total living space of over 16,300 m² were built in the preserved buildings of the former Kathen barracks. The Federal Network Agency has settled in the southern section of the conversion area. The first auction of the UMTS licences took place there in 2000 with proceeds of 50 billion euros.

due to their outward appearance the garrison buildings to the north of Canisiusstraße characterise the urban character of this area and were placed under protection in 1998 as "cityscape-defining". The axially symmetrical ensemble with uniform building heights and identical roof pitches in a curved arrangement along the street forms an urban unit worth preserving.

The streets in the former barracks that gave their names to the National Socialists today form a strong contrast to their former names after Kathen: Maria Sibylla Merian, Sophie Grosch (1874-1962), Hans Brantzen (1912-1979), Agnes Karll, Willy Brandt, Michael Forestier (1880-1951) or the mayor Franz Ludwig Alexander, negotiator with Karl Külb for a "peaceful" incorporation of Gonsenheim in 1928 and last mayor of the independent community of Gonsenheim.

== Layout plan ==
- Layout plan Lee Barracks, Mainz, late 1970s (US Military Installation Atlas, 37th Trans Gp, 1980) Lee Barracks and Sandflora Family Housing Area
