= Bombing of Mainz in World War II =

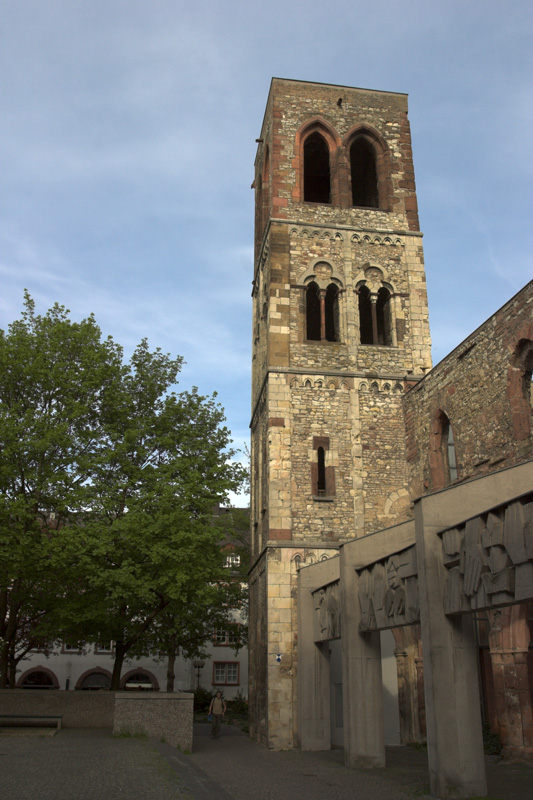
War memorial and symbol of the destroyed city: the ruins of St. Christoph's Church, Mainz

The German city of Mainz was bombed in multiple air raids by the Allies during World War II by the Royal Air Force (RAF), as well as the United States Army Air Forces. These led to numerous victims and heavy damage throughout the cityscape.

== Overview of major air raids ==
- Altstadt, Mombach (11/12 and 12/13 August 1942)
- Bischofsheim (9 September 1942, autumn 1944, 13 and 27 January 1945, 27. February 1945)
- Ginsheim (23/24 April 1944)
- Gonsenheim (Kathen-Kaserne: 19 October 1944)
- Gustavsburg (particularly 9, 15 September 1944 and 27 February 1945)
- Mainz-Kastel (particularly 8 September 1944)
- Mainz-Kostheim (autumn 1944)
- Mainz-Neustadt (11/12 und 12/13 August 1942, 20 December 1943, autumn 1944, 1 February and 27 February 1945)
- Mainz-Weisenau (particularly 19 October 1944, 1 February and 27 February 1945)

== 1939 to 1941 ==
During the first two years of World War II, the Royal Air Force conducted only minor raids on Mainz. The first major British air raid took place on 13 September 1941, targeting Mainz Hauptbahnhof (Mainz main station). A total of 22 people died during this attack, which had originally been scheduled for Frankfurt am Main.

== 1942 to 1943 ==
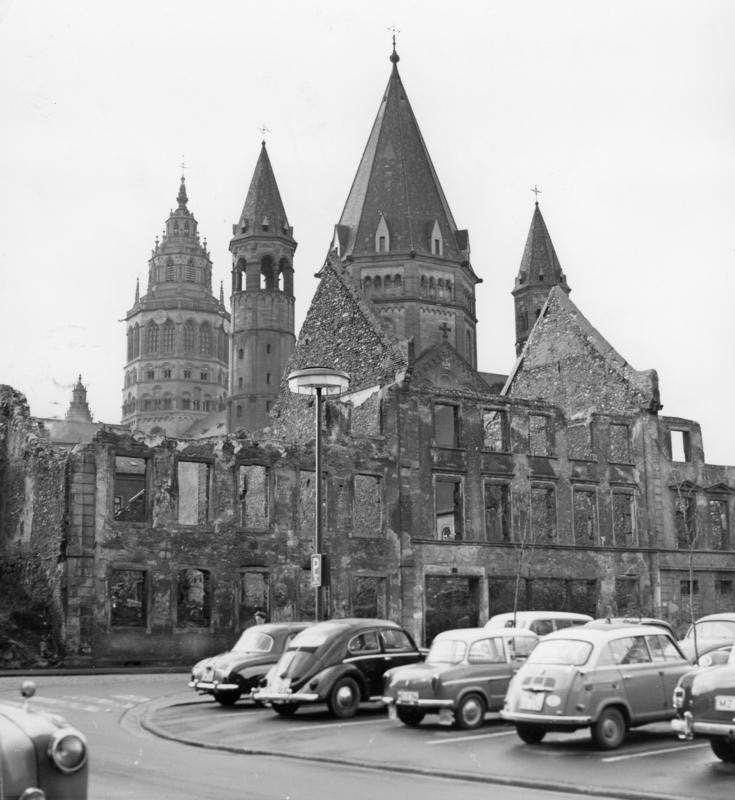
Ruins in front of the cathedral (1961)

More small raids followed until 11 August 1942 when the RAF Bomber Command launched 158 bombers against Mainz. This raid followed the Area Bombing Directive of 5 February 1942, Directive No.4, issued by the British Air Ministry. This directive ordered RAF bombers to attack the German industrial workforce and the morale of the German populace through bombing German cities and their civilian inhabitants. During the following night, 200 tons of bombs were dropped, including white phosphorus bombs. The next night another 133 aircraft attacked the city, dropping approximately 180 tons of bombs, many of which hit the old city center and the Mainz Cathedral, or the Mainzer Dom. Other parts hit included the Neustadt and Mombach, whose St. Nikolaus Church was destroyed by incendiary bombs. St. Stephen's Church was heavily damaged, St. John's Church was burnt out completely, and the Invalidenhaus for the disabled was ruined. The Eltzer Hof and the Bauhof burnt down. Hundreds of people died in the flames. Nonetheless, some quarters in the core city remained habitable. On 9 September 1942 Allied bombers bombed Bischofsheim. The air defences of Mainz were aided by an anti-aircraft battery set up on the premises of today's University of Mainz.

== 1944 ==
In the course of the year 1944 the intensity of the bombing campaign increased. A British emergency drop during the night of 23 to 24 April led to multiple fire in parts of Ginsheim. Through this the local Evangelical Church was destroyed. In the autumn targeted attacks on the city accumulated. On 8 September Kastel was hit hard and again Gustavsburg on the 8 and 15 September. Parts of Kostheim were bombed on 8 September and Mainz-Weisenau on 19 October. On the same day the Kathen barracks in Gonsenheim were destroyed by bombing and fire. Throughout the autumn, there were perpetual alerts for bombers flying over the area.

On 18 December 1944 the Allies targeted the railway infrastructure around Mainz. According to operation reports released by the US Army Air Force, 157 Boeing B-17 Flying Fortress of the Eighth Air Force dropped 430.7 metric tons of explosive bombs from an altitude of 27,000 feet in several waves between 01:45 to 01:59 pm. 89 people died.

== 1945 ==
=== January 1945 ===
On 13 and 27 January the Eighth Air Force bombed railway facilities in Bischofsheim and Gustavsburg. A large-scale attack on Mainz was planned by RAF for 1 February, but the bombs missed their target and landed in the majority on the "Großberg" in Weisenau. The Christuskirche was destroyed that day by incendiary bombs and a subsequent fire.

=== Air raid on 27 February 1945 ===
On 27 February 1945 the RAF sent 435 bombers to attack Mainz. Between the hours of 16:29 and 16:45, 1,500 tons of bombs were dropped, hitting large areas of the Neustadt. The old arsenal, St. Joseph and St. Boniface were also destroyed. Weisenau, Gustavsburg, and Bischofsheim were also hit hard, and there were reports of burnt material from the raid as far as Gonsenheim. The old city center, bombed in 1942, was not affected. The 1,209 confirmed dead was low in comparison to other cities. Some of them were buried in the Waldfriedhof (forest cemetery) in Mombach. The real goal of the air raid—the railway facilities—remained undamaged. Three days after the attack trains were again driving in and out of the city. Madonna sculptures were found in great numbers in Mainz; it was supposed to have had more than 200 of them before World War II.

=== End of the war in Mainz and occupation by the Allies ===
Just over three weeks later, on 22 March 1945, the war ended for the city of Mainz, 80 percent of which was now destroyed. The remaining Wehrmacht and Volkssturm units withdrew across the Rhine and the city surrendered without a fight to the Third US Army under General George S. Patton. Mainz remained under American administration until July 1945, after which the city was placed under French administration.
