= Ginsheim-Gustavsburg =

- Town
- Coat of arms

- Location of Ginsheim-Gustavsburg within Groß-Gerau district
- Interactive map of Ginsheim-Gustavsburg
- Location within Germany Location within Hesse
- Coordinates: 49°59′N 08°20′E
- Country: Germany
- State: Hesse
- Admin. region: Darmstadt
- District: Groß-Gerau

Government
  - Mayor (2021–27): Thorsten Siehr (SPD)

Area
  - Total: 13.94 km^{2} (5.38 sq mi)
- Elevation: 85 m (279 ft)

Population (2025-12-31)
  - Total: 16,452
  - Density: 1,180/km^{2} (3,057/sq mi)
- Time zone: UTC+01:00 (CET)
  - Summer (DST): UTC+02:00 (CEST)
- Postal codes: 65462
- Dialling codes: 06134 (Gustavsburg), 06144 (Ginsheim)
- Vehicle registration: GG
- Website: www.gigu.de

The double city of Ginsheim-Gustavsburg (German pronunciation: [ˈɡɪnshaɪm ˈɡʊstafsˌbʊʁk]) in the northwest of the Groß-Gerau district in the German state of Hesse, has about 16,000 inhabitants. It is part of what is called the Rhine-Main region in Germany which has the city of Frankfurt am Main at its centre.

== Geography ==
=== Location ===
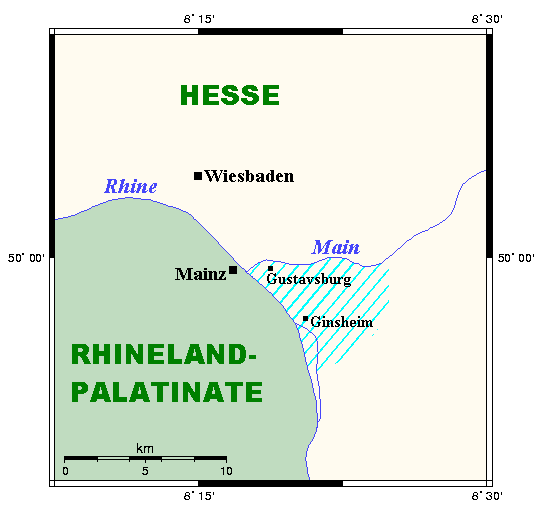
Map showing position in relation to Mainz and Wiesbaden. The Mainspitze triangle is hatched in cyan.

Ginsheim-Gustavsburg lies south of the Main and north of the Rhine in the so-called Mainspitze triangle, a narrow piece of land between the Main and Rhine where the former empties into the latter. Across the Rhine from the community lies Mainz. Wiesbaden is also nearby.

=== Neighbouring communities ===
Ginsheim-Gustavsburg borders in the north on the district-free city of Wiesbaden and the town of Hochheim (Main-Taunus-Kreis), in the east on the community of Bischofsheim and the town of Rüsselsheim, in the south on the community of Trebur, and in the west on the community of Bodenheim (Mainz-Bingen) and the district-free city of Mainz.

=== Constituent communities ===
As its name suggests, Ginsheim-Gustavsburg consists of two centres, named Ginsheim and Gustavsburg.

== History ==
=== Ginsheim ===
The placename is believed to go back to the Frankish Gimmo family and had its first documentary mention in 1211 as "Ginnensheim" in the "Oculus Memorie" (Eberbach Monastery's goods directory). After the former Imperial village was pledged to Count Dieter von Katzenelnbogen in 1248, history yields other noble families' names such as Falkenstein, Sayen and Isenburg as the village's overlords changed. In 1600, the village ended up in the Hesse-Darmstadt Landgrave Ludwig V's hands. In the Thirty Years' War, the community was so badly battered that from 1634 to 1642, hardly anyone lived there.

Typical trades in Ginsheim in bygone ages are said to have been farmer, fisherman and miller. Milling developed itself into a proper line of industry. At any one time, up to 15 floating watermills were anchored at Ginsheim, with the last one being withdrawn from service in 1929. It was towed to Mainz Harbour where it was placed under protection as a monument until it was destroyed in an air-raid late in the Second World War. This and some other interesting chapters in the local history are on display at the Heimatmuseum.

=== Gustavsburg ===
The constituent community of Gustavsburg owes its name to the Swedish King Gustav Adolf, who in 1632, during the Thirty Years' War had a fort built on the Mainspitze. Found during work on this was, among other things, a Roman horseman's gravestone, a copy of which now graces the Town Hall's lobby. In 1635, the Swedes quit the Gustavsburg, as the fort was known ("Gustavsburg" literally means "Gustav's castle" in German), which after changing hands several times in the war at last fell into French hands. In 1673, Mainz Elector Johann Philipp von Schönborn had the complex razed. Until 1740, according to one municipal map, the only resident business in what is now Gustavsburg was a tiler's workshop.

When the railway was opened in 1858, so was the Hafenbahnhof Gustavsburg (Gustavsburg Harbour Railway Station). A year later, the Nuremberg firm Klett & Co. (which later became MAN-Werk Gustavsburg branch of nowadays Maschinenfabrik Augsburg-Nürnberg, or MAN) began building work on a bridge across the Rhine. An assembly area was set up in Gustavsburg as part of the project, and workers and their families moved into this area. Quickly there arose an industrial community.

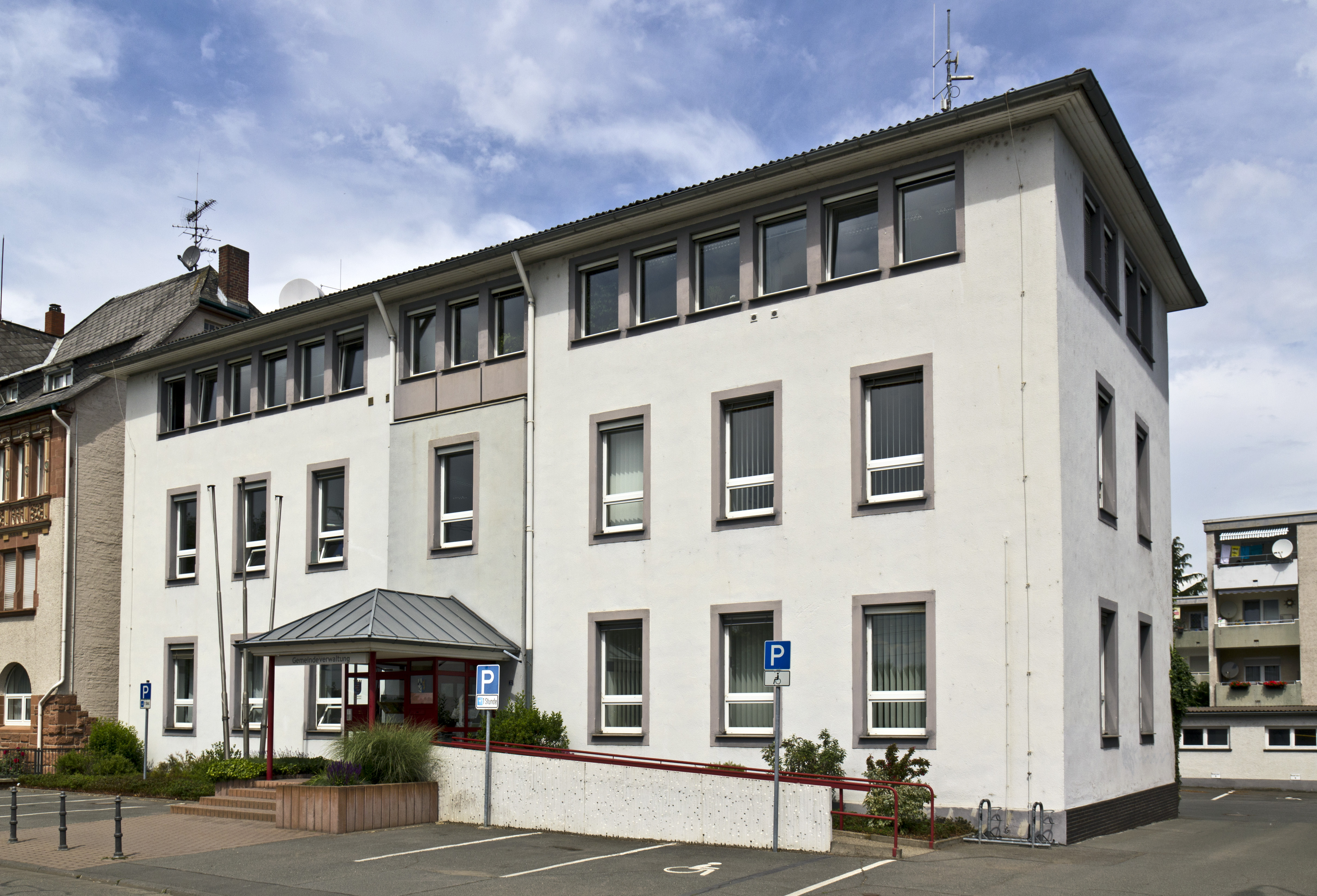
Gustavsburg Town hall

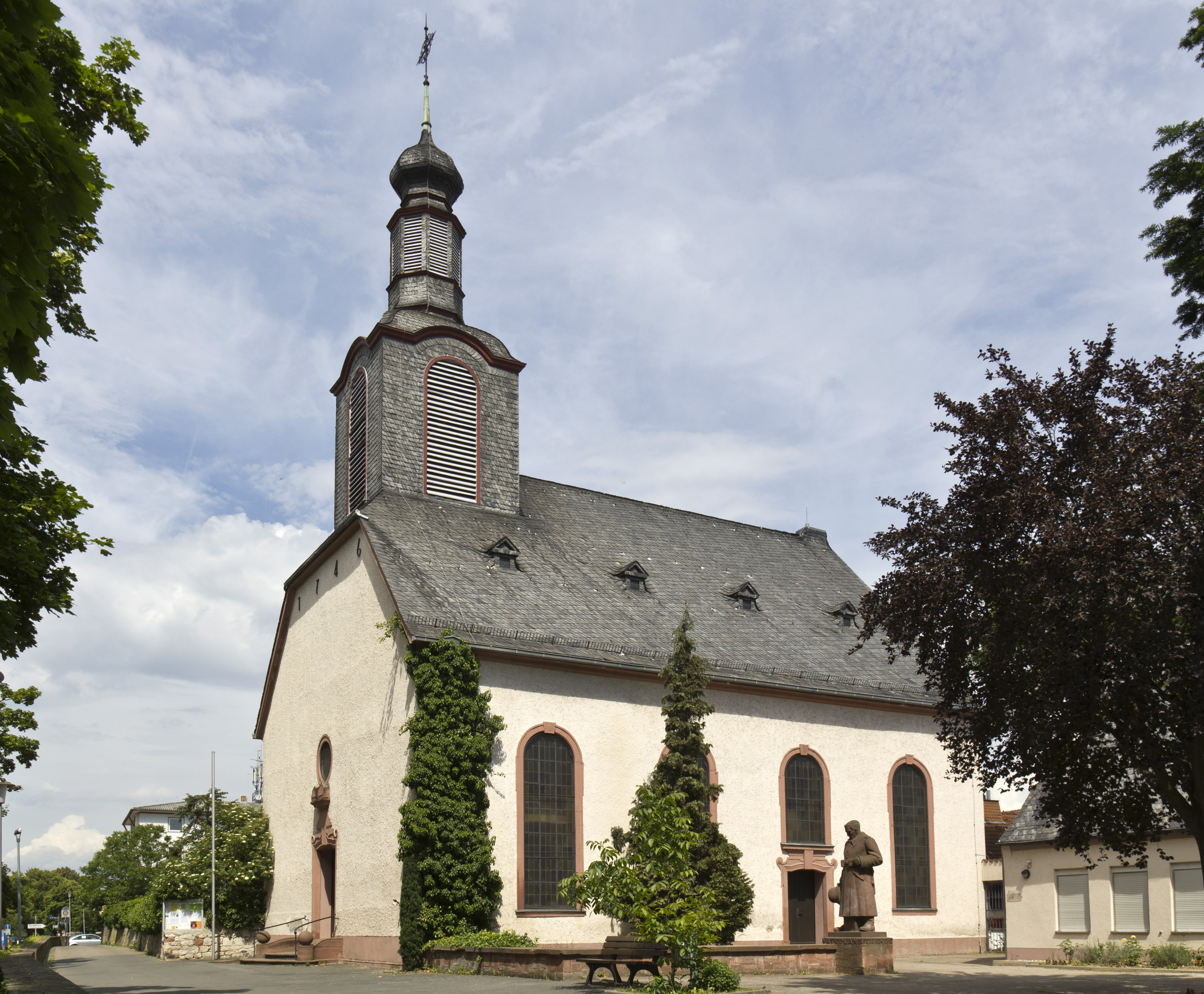
Ginsheim Evangelic church

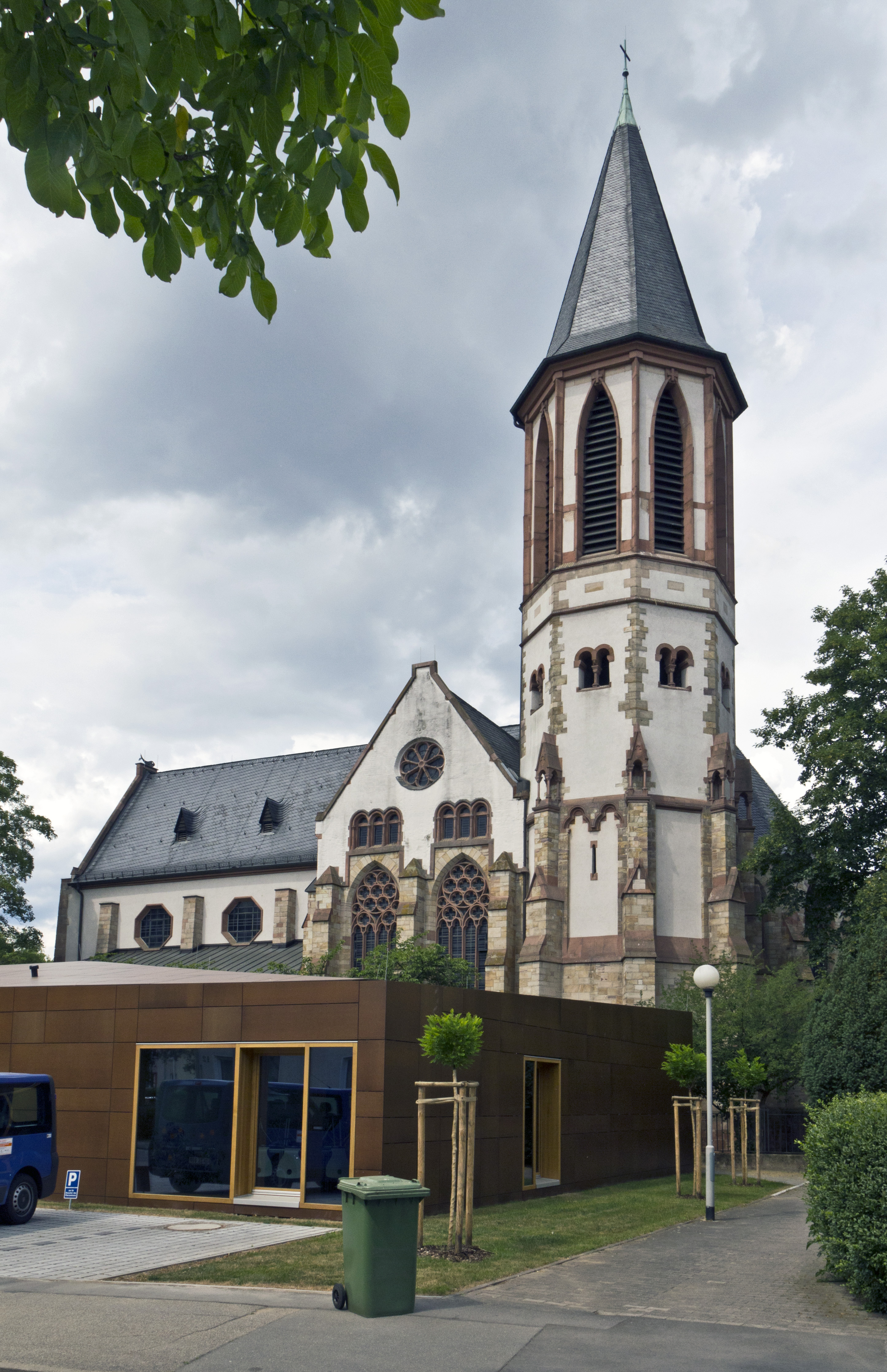
Gustavsburg Catholic church (Herz-Jesu-Kirche)

=== Creation of the community of Ginsheim-Gustavsburg ===
In 1806, Napoleon placed Kastel, Kostheim, the Maarau (floodplain) and the islands just offshore under French administration. Left Bank of the Rhine had been brought under French sovereignty in 1801. The Frenches had no interest in that part of Kostheim's municipal area that lay south of the river Main, and so the area where Gustavsburg lies today passed to the Grand Duke of Hesse-Darmstadt who in turn gave it to Ginsheim. On 30 December 1808, the Ginsheim Schultheiß (roughly "sheriff"), confirmed this new acquisition. In the years that followed, Kostheim townsfolk who still owned land south of the Main sold their fields to Ginsheim farmers, thus making 1808 Ginsheim-Gustavsburg's actual time of birth.

On 28 September 1929, the double community's councils voted to be amalgamated with the city of Mainz. In November 1929, the Hessian Landtag approved the separation of the Ginsheim municipal area and the Ginsheim Rhine floodplains from Groß-Gerau district and Starkenburg province so that they could be assigned to Mainz district and Rheinhessen province.

In the cause of the bombing of Mainz in World War II Ginsheim was subject to air raids. Thus it remained until the end of World War II in 1945, when the Rhine became a boundary between two zones of occupation, the French and the American, splitting the communities on the Mainspitze triangle away from Mainz and grouping Ginsheim-Gustavsburg and Bischofsheim once again with Groß-Gerau district. They have never been reincorporated into Mainz, and indeed the two municipalities nowadays lie in two different Bundesländer, with Ginsheim-Gustavsburg in Hesse and Mainz in Rhineland-Palatinate.

== Politics ==
=== Partnerships ===
- Bouguenais, France, since 1989
- Ballou, Senegal, since 1989

== Economy and infrastructure ==
=== Transport ===
Ginsheim-Gustavsburg is directly reachable by motorways (German: Autobahn) A 60 and A 671. In Gustavsburg there is a railway station called Mainz-Gustavsburg (recalling Gustavsburg's former status as a Mainz constituent community) and a harbour on the Rhine.

== Culture and sightseeing ==
=== Ginsheim ===
The location on an oxbow lake of river Rhine with the offshore islands Nonnenau (reachable by the ferry Johanna), Langenau and Rabenwörth, and Rheinauen (Rhine floodplains) have made Ginsheim into a visited local recreation area. Worth seeing is the Evangelical church, which was built in 1746 as a Baroque hall with a three-sided end. The Altrheinfest (Old Rhine Festival) – on the first weekend in June, organized by local clubs – draws many visitors, even from outside.

Other things to see include a yacht marina, a local history museum (Heimatmuseum) and an historical industrial crane.

=== Gustavsburg ===
Worth seeing in Gustavsburg are the two churches, the Main Sluice, the Mainspitze and the Cramer-Klett-Platz workers' neighbourhood, which now stands under protection as a monument. Every year, a Christmas Market is held there. The greatest yearly festival is the Burgfest ("Castle Festival"), held at Whitsun.

There is also a new park built where King Gustav Adolf's fort once was.

== Personalities ==
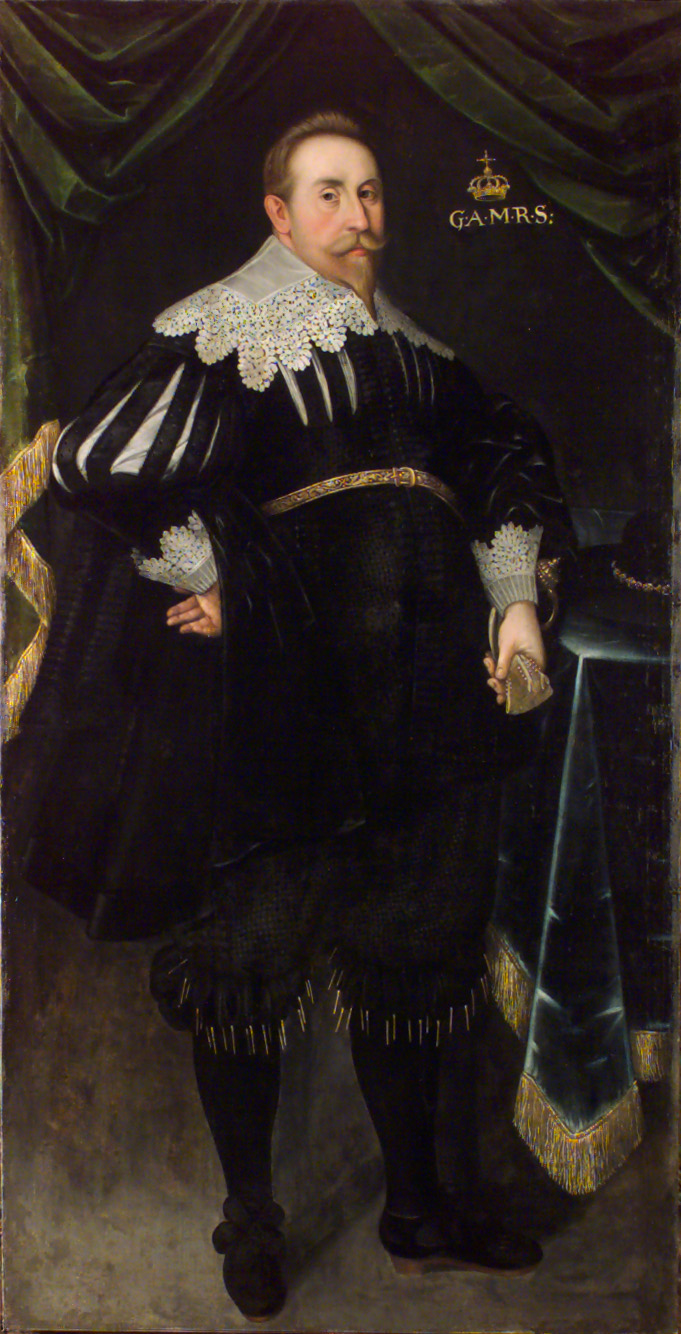
Gustav II Adolf around 1630

- Gustavus Adolphus of Sweden (1594-1632), King of Sweden, founder of the fortress and city of Gustavsburg
