= Drais =

- Stadtteil of Mainz
- Coat of arms
- Interactive map of Drais
- Location within Germany Location within Rhineland-Palatinate
- Coordinates: 49°58′30″N 8°11′30″E
- Country: Germany
- State: Rhineland-Palatinate
- District: Urban district
- City: Mainz
- Founded: 24 August 1149

Government
  - Mayor: vacant (CDU)

Area
  - Total: 3.1 km^{2} (1.2 sq mi)

Population (2024)
  - Total: 3,137
  - Density: 1,000/km^{2} (2,600/sq mi)
- Time zone: UTC+01:00 (CET)
  - Summer (DST): UTC+02:00 (CEST)
- Postal codes: 55127
- Dialling codes: 06131
- Vehicle registration: MZ
- Website: Drais.info Drais on Mainz.de

Mainz-Drais (Drais) is a borough in the western part of Mainz. The village was suburbanised by the City of Mainz in 1969, and is now its smallest subdivision, with just over 3,000 permanent residents.

== Geography ==
Drais is located atop a hill overlooking Mainz and the Rhine Valley. The village of Drais has maintained its historical boundaries, and is surrounded by apple, plum and strawberry orchards.

Drais is surrounded by the larger more urban Mainz sub divisions of Finthen, Bretzenheim, Gonsenheim and Lerchenberg.

== History ==
The earliest traces of settlement in the current location of Drais dates back to around 850–450 BC. A permanent settlement would only come around the year 1000 AD with the clearing of the Ancient Olm Forest. Drais was officially recognized by King Conrad III of Germany on 24 August 1149 under the name 'Treise'. Throughout the Middle Ages Drais belonged to the Archbishopric of Mainz under the direction of the office of Olm.

During the Thirty Years' War, Drais as well as many other villages, towns and cities in the region suffered greatly. In 1620 Drais was sacked and plundered by the General Ambrogio Spinola during his campaign in the lower Palatinate. Several years later, as a result of the Battle of Breitenfeld Drais was occupied by Swedish forces from 1631 till 1635.

In 1792 during the French Revolution, the French Revolutionary Army took over Mainz and the surrounding areas. With the support of 130 German towns and villages, the French proclaimed the founding of the independent Republic of Mainz. As this did not sit well with the Kingdom of Prussia which was seeking to maintain its control of trade on the Rhine River, Prussian troops were immediately dispatched to lay siege to Mainz. During the 18-week Siege, Prussian troops occupied Drais. On 23 July 1793 the French surrendered Mainz.

After the Treaty of Campo Formio in 1797, the French retook the region with an army under the command of Napoléon Bonaparte. During the occupation of France from 1797 till May 1814, Drais was governed by the newly formed French Département of Mont Tonnerre. With the departure of the French, Mainz was assigned to the Grand Duchy of Hesse and became the capital of the province Rhenish Hesse (Rheinhessen). Drais remained as an independent village within Rheinhessen, and then later Rhineland-Palatinate until its suburbanisation on 8 June 1969 by the city Mainz.

Today, Drais remains a traditional village within the city limits of Mainz.

== Places of interest ==
=== Jesuit cloister ===
The former cloister of the Jesuit order of the Propstei Hirzenach was built in Drais in 1670. Since 1773 with the breakup of the order, the building has been transferred through various private ownerships. The site of the cloister currently includes a retirement community.

=== Catholic church „Maria Königin“ (Queen Mary) ===
The Maria Königin Church was first erected in 1737 with the help of the local Jesuit community. The predecessor to the Maria Königin Church had been first erected in 1357 and had seen limited service since the 30 year's war due to extensive damage. The Catholic Church „Maria Königin“ continues to hold regular services and is the main Catholic Church in Drais.

=== Fruit markets ===
Starting in late spring till early autumn, farms in and around Drais sell a portion of their harvest through local markets. Fruit at these markets include a variety of berries (including strawberries), cherries, apples and plums). Strawberries from Drais are well known to be among some of the best in the region due to Drais's geographical location. Mainz residents sometimes drive to Drais to buy fruit during the summer months.

Throughout the year, farmers also place fruit and vegetables for sale on open racks within the village. Payment is made on "goodwill" as no one is there to collect the payment.

== Origins of the name ==
The name Drais most likely has its origins from the Gothic word driusan, which translates to "bubbling sources".

== Literature ==
- Die Mainzer Stadtteile; Claus Wolf; Emons Verlag, 2004
- Mainz – Die Geschichte der Stadt; editors: Franz Dumont, Ferdinand Scherf, Friedrich Schütz; 2nd edition; Verlag Philipp von Zabern, Mainz 1999
- Vor den Toren der großen Stadt – 850 Jahre Drais 1189–1999–Beiträge zur Draiser Ortsgeschichte; ed.: Walter G. Rödel; ISBN 3-87439-475-1
- Drais und Marienborn. Die ältesten Besiedlungsspuren bis zu den ersten historischen Erwähnungen.; Ronald Knöchlein, editor: Gerd Rupprecht, Archäologische Ortsbetrachtungen vol. 6, Verlag Philipp von Zabern, Mainz 2004; ISBN 3-8053-3490-7
