= Bodenheim station =

Railway station in Bodenheim, Germany

Bodenheim
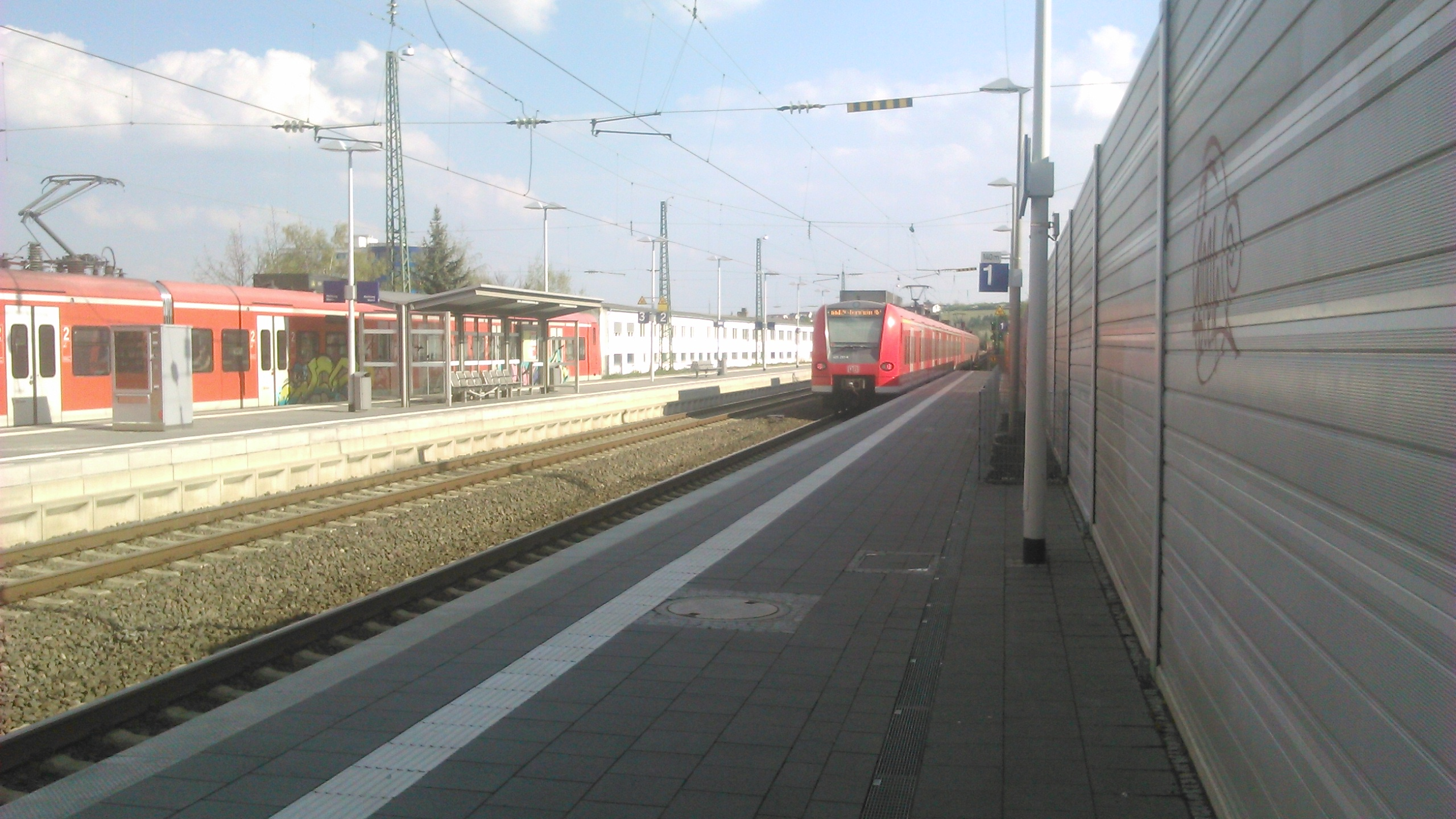
- 2017

General information
- Location: Bahnhofsplatz/Wormser Straße; 55294 Bodenheim; Rhineland-Palatinate; Germany
- Coordinates: 49.93°N 8.31°E
- System: Bf
- Owner: Deutsche Bahn
- Operator: DB Station&Service
- Lines: Mainz–Ludwigshafen railway (KBS 660); Alzey–Bodenheim railway (KBS 661)
- Platforms: 1 island platform 1 side platform
- Tracks: 3
- Train operators: DB Regio Mitte; vlexx; S-Bahn RheinNeckar
- Connections: 667

Construction
- Parking: yes
- Cycle facilities: yes
- Accessible: yes

Other information
- Station code: 739
- DS100 code: FBOD
- IBNR: 8000359
- Category: 4
- Fare zone: RNN: 313; : 6860 (RNN transitional tariff)
- Website: www.bahnhof.de

Services
Preceding station	Vlexx	Following station
Mainz Römisches Theater towards Kaiserslautern Hbf	RE 15 selected trains only	Terminus
Mainz-Laubenheim towards Mainz Hbf	RB 44 selected trains only	Nackenheim towards Worms Hbf
Preceding station	Rhine-Neckar S-Bahn	Following station
Mainz-Laubenheim towards Mainz Hbf	S6	Nackenheim towards Bensheim
Location
- Location within Rhineland-Palatinate Location within Germany Location within Europe

Bodenheim station (German: Bahnhof Bodenheim) is a railway station in the municipality of Bodenheim, located in the Mainz-Bingen district in Rhineland-Palatinate, Germany.
