= Mainz-Laubenheim =

Laubenheim
- Stadtteil of Mainz
- Coat of arms

- Location of Laubenheim within Mainz
- Interactive map of Laubenheim
- Location within Germany Location within Rhineland-Palatinate
- Coordinates: 49°57′N 8°19′E
- Country: Germany
- State: Rhineland-Palatinate
- District: Urban district
- City: Mainz

Government
  - Mayor: Norbert Riffel (CDU)

Area
  - Total: 8.8 km^{2} (3.4 sq mi)

Population (2024)
  - Total: 9,203
  - Density: 1,000/km^{2} (2,700/sq mi)
- Time zone: UTC+01:00 (CET)
  - Summer (DST): UTC+02:00 (CEST)
- Postal codes: 55130
- Dialling codes: 06131
- Website: mz-laubenheim.de

Mainz-Laubenheim is a southern quarter of Mainz and is located south of the A60 autobahn and west of the B9 highway on the banks of the Rhine.

== History ==
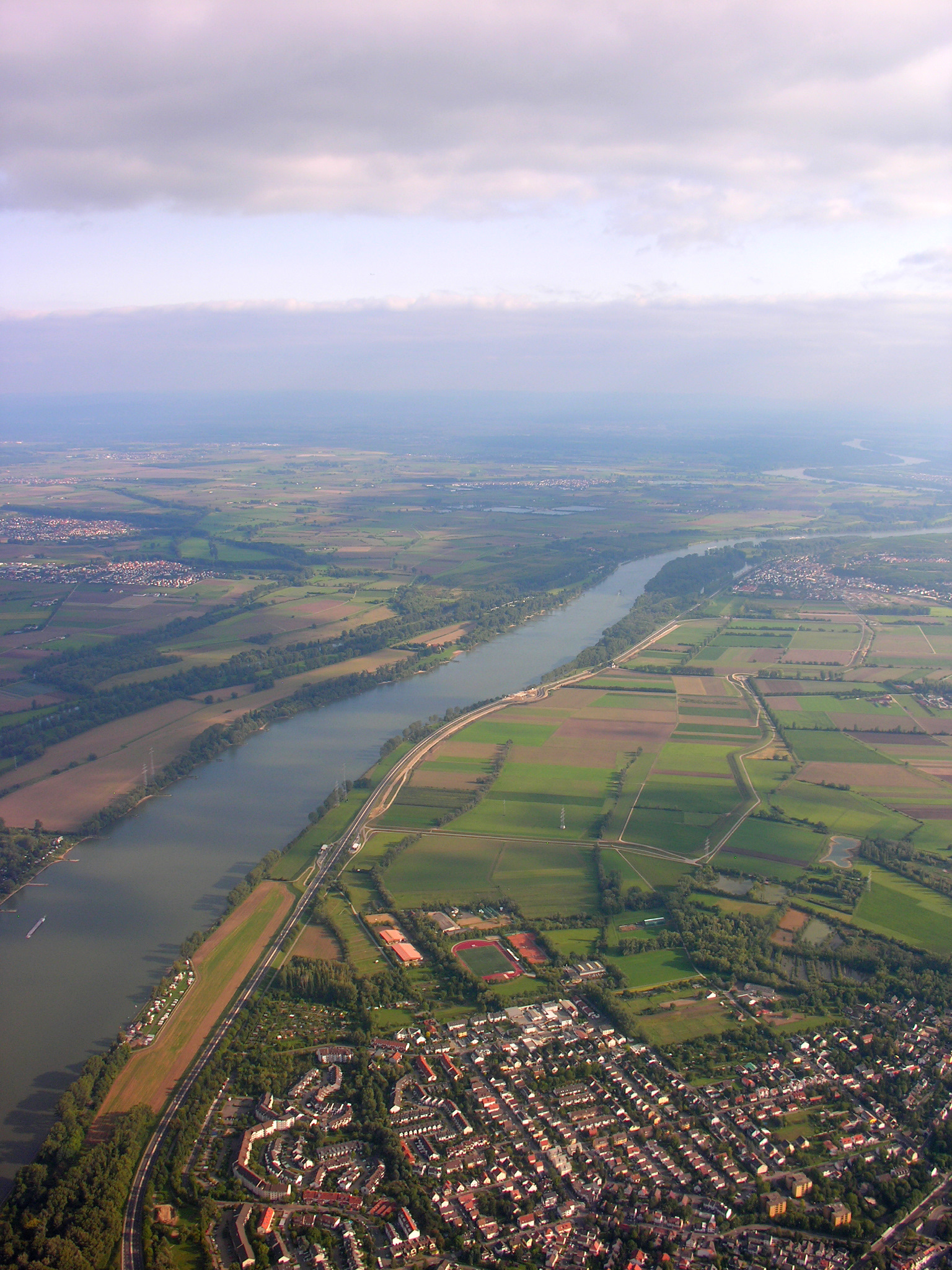
Aerial view of the Rhine at Laubenheim

The first documented mention of Mainz-Laubenheim was in 773 AD, under the name Nubenheim. In 1801, Laubenheim came under French possession, and in 1816 was taken over by the Grand Duchy of Hessen. On 8 June 1969, Laubenheim became part of the city of Mainz.

== Traffic ==
Mainz-Laubenheim is connected to the local railway network by its Mainz-Laubenheim stop, which is part of the Mainz-Mannheim railway line. S-Bahn line S6 of the S-Bahn RheinNeckar stop here every half hour.

Laubenheim is also well connected to the rest of the state capital by several bus lines of the Mainzer Verkehrsgesellschaft (MVG). Depending on the line, the city centre of Mainz can be reached in 15 to 30 minutes.

Furthermore, Mainz-Laubenheim has a connection to the Bundesstraße 9 and, through a connection to the Bundesautobahn 60, to the Mainzer Autobahnring.

== Literature ==
- Claus Wolf (2004). Die Mainzer Stadtteile (in German). Emons Verlag. ISBN 3-89705-361-6.
