= Mainz Römisches Theater station =

Railway station in Mainz, Germany

Mainz Römisches Theater
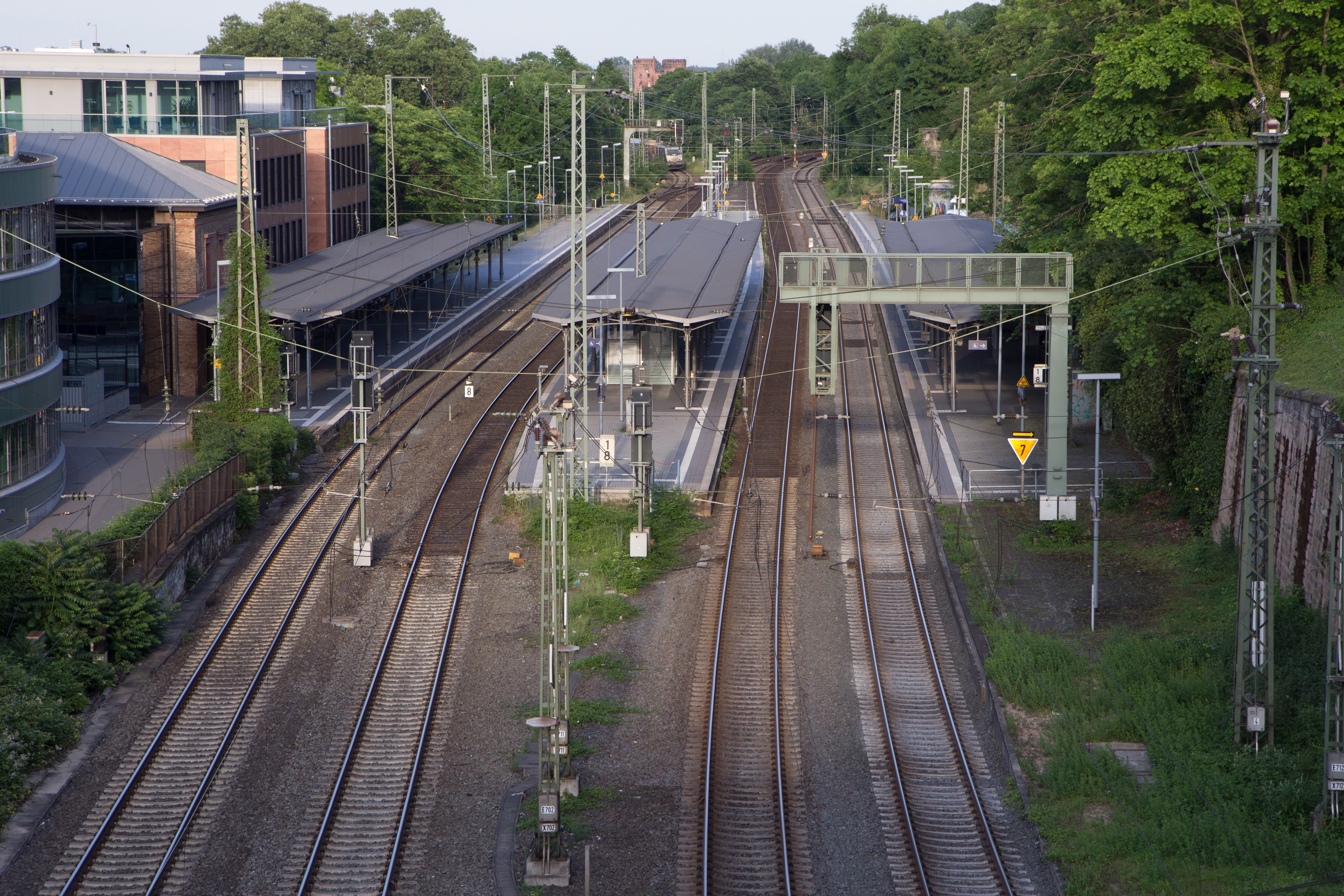
- View of the station from above the Mainz Railway Tunnel

General information
- Location: Holzhofstr. 1a, Mainz, Rhineland-Palatinate; Germany
- Coordinates: 49°59′36″N 8°16′40″E
- Owner: DB Netz
- Operator: DB Station&Service
- Lines: Rhine-Main Railway (KBS 651); Main Railway (KBS 645.8/655; West Rhine Railway (KBS 470); Mainz–Ludwigshafen (KBS 660)
- Platforms: 4
- Train operators: S-Bahn Rhein-Main

Construction
- Accessible: Yes

Other information
- Station code: 3900
- DS100 code: FMS
- IBNR: 8000139
- Category: 3
- Fare zone: : 6511; RNN: 300 (RMV transitional tariff)
- Website: www.bahnhof.de

History
- Opened: 1884
- Former names: Mainz Süd

Services
Preceding station	DB Regio Mitte	Following station
Mainz Hbf towards Frankfurt (Main) Hbf	RE 2 Südwest-Express	Mainz-Bischofsheim towards Koblenz Hbf
Preceding station	Vlexx	Following station
Mainz Hbf towards Saarbrücken Hbf	RE 3	Mainz-Bischofsheim towards Frankfurt (Main) Hbf
Mainz Hbf towards Kaiserslautern Hbf	RE 15 selected trains only	Mainz-Laubenheim towards Bodenheim
Mainz Hbf Terminus	RB 44 selected trains only	Mainz-Laubenheim towards Worms Hbf
Preceding station	Hessische Landesbahn	Following station
Mainz Hbf towards Wiesbaden Hbf	RB 75	Mainz-Bischofsheim towards Aschaffenburg Hbf
Preceding station	Rhine-Main S-Bahn	Following station
Mainz Hbf towards Wiesbaden Hbf	S8 (Rhine-Main S-Bahn)	Mainz-Gustavsburg towards Hanau Hbf
Preceding station	Rhine-Neckar S-Bahn	Following station
Mainz Hbf Terminus	S6	Mainz-Laubenheim towards Bensheim
Location
- Location within Rhineland-Palatinate

Mainz Römisches Theater station is a station in the city of Mainz, the capital of the German state of Rhineland-Palatinate on the Main Railway from Mainz to Frankfurt am Main. It is the most important station in the city after Mainz Hauptbahnhof. It is classified by Deutsche Bahn as a category 3 station. The station is served by S-Bahn and regional trains.

== History ==
Mainz Römisches (Roman) Theater is the third name of this station. Until the timetable change in December 2006, it was called Mainz Süd. It was opened as Mainz-Neuthor station on the Rhine-Main Railway from Mainz to Darmstadt and Aschaffenburg. The railway between Mainz and Darmstadt was opened on 1 August 1858 and used a train ferry to cross the Rhine until 1862 when the South Bridge was put into service. The Mainz-Ludwigshafen line opened later. In 1884 a bypass of central Mainz was opened along with Mainz Hauptbahnhof with its southern end near the original Mainz-Neuthor station.

== Entrance building and its facilities ==
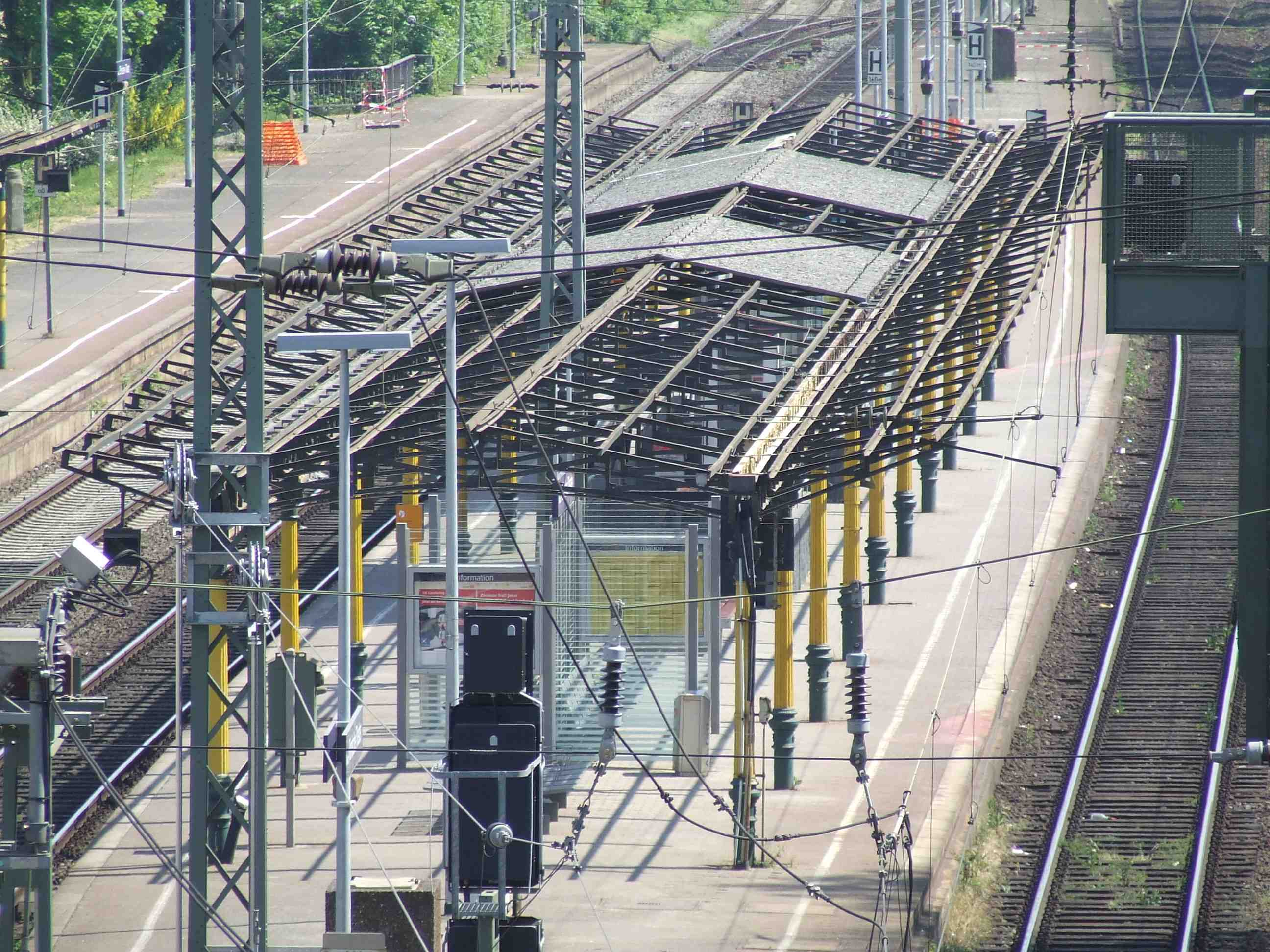
The platform canopies were rebuilt between December 2006 and December 2008 (photo of April 2007)

A new station building was opened in 1884 on the north side of the platforms, but it was largely demolished in 2006. It was a brick building, designed by Johann Philipp Berdellé. The ground floor had Rundbogenstil rounded portals that continued into the windows of the lower eastern arcade. The main building had two storeys, with rectangular windows of bunter sandstone in a renaissance revival style. After the redesign and construction of commercial buildings at the station, only the listed facade of the old building has been preserved near the rail tracks. This facade has been integrated into the new building.

The station retains the historic cast iron columns with fluted shafts and composite capitals of the platform roof, which were built in a neoclassical style in 1861 and which had probably been previously used at the old Hessian Ludwig Railway station in Darmstadt. They were refurbished in the spring of 2008. However, the overall redevelopment of the station itself has still not started. The renovation work at the station will cost around €1 million.

Directly above the station is the citadel. The Neutor barracks were built in 1866 directly below the station to defend the railway from a possible French invasion. Both buildings had to be bypassed.

The name of the station used since December 2006 is derived from the adjacent ruins of a former Roman theatre. The platform of track 4 crosses the stage area of the ancient theatre. During construction of the railway line through this ground no thought was given to protecting this monument. The retaining wall of the 19th century railway has been partially removed in recent years, enabling the excavation of the theatre.

== Rail operations ==
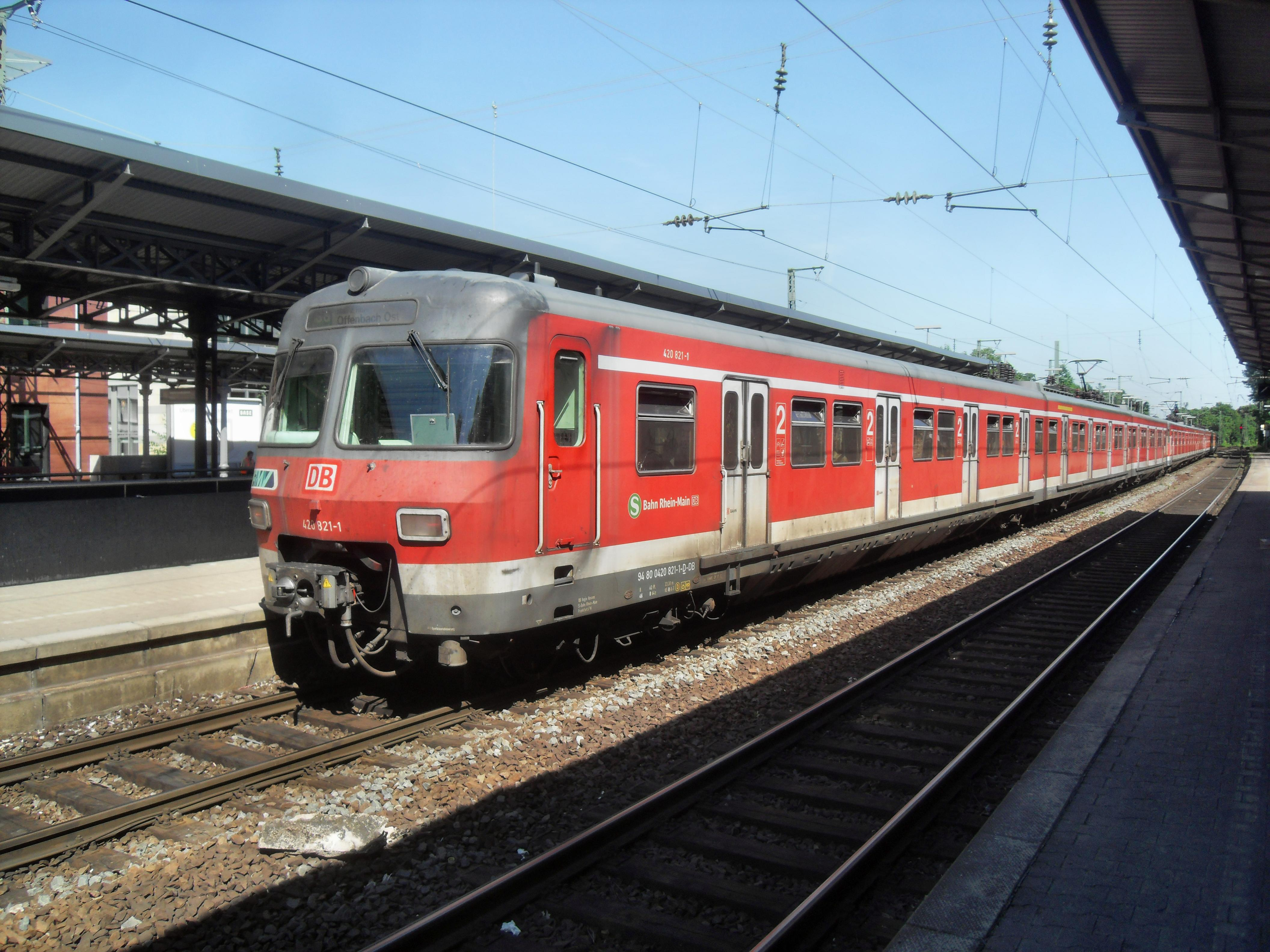
Line S 8 train of the Rhine-Main S-Bahn on the way to Offenbach via Frankfurt

The station has three platforms on four tracks. The tracks towards Mainz Hauptbahnhof enter the Mainz railway tunnel immediately west of the station under the Eisgrub.

From here, three routes are operated to the southeast:

- the Rhine-Main Railway (to Darmstadt and Aschaffenburg, operated by the Regionalbahn RB 75 service)
- The Main Railway (to Frankfurt, Offenbach (Main) Ost and Hanau Hauptbahnhof, operated by line S 8 of the Rhine-Main S-Bahn)
- the Mainz–Ludwigshafen–Mannheim line

Trains run to the northwest to Mainz Hauptbahnhof, Wiesbaden Hauptbahnhof, Koblenz Hauptbahnhof and to Saarbrücken Hauptbahnhof.

All platforms are accessible for the disabled. After initially there was a lift from the heritage-listed pedestrian underpass only to platform 1, work began in early 2012 to install two lifts to platforms 2 to 4. The new lifts to platforms 2 to 4 have been usable by passengers since December 2012.

== Regional and S-Bahn services ==
Regional rail services are as follows:

Line	Route	Frequency
S6	Mainz – Mainz Römisches Theater – Oppenheim – Worms – Bobenheim-Roxheim – Frankenthal – Ludwigshafen – Mannheim (– Weinheim – Bensheim)	Every 60 mins
S8 (Rhine-Main S-Bahn)	Wiesbaden – Mainz – Mainz Römisches Theater – Rüsselsheim – Frankfurt Airport – Frankfurt Hbf (tief) – Offenbach (Main) Ost (– Hanau)	Every 30 mins
RE 2	Frankfurt Hbf – Frankfurt Airport – Rüsselsheim – Mainz Römisches Theater – Mainz Hbf – Bingen – Koblenz	Every two hours
RE 3	Frankfurt Hbf – Frankfurt Airport – Rüsselsheim – Mainz Römisches Theater – Mainz Hbf – Bad Kreuznach – Idar-Oberstein – Türkismühle – Saarbrücken	Every two hours
RE 14	Frankfurt – Frankfurt-Höchst – Hochheim – Mainz Römisches Theater – Mainz Hbf – Worms – Frankenthal – Ludwigshafen Mitte – Mannheim	Some trains
RB 31	(Frankfurt – Frankfurt Airport – Rüsselsheim – Mainz Römisches Theater –) Mainz – Gonsenheim – Klein Winternheim-Ober Olm – Nieder-Olm – Saulheim – Wörrstadt – Armsheim – Albig – Alzey (– Wahlheim – Freimersheim – Kirchheimbolanden)	Some trains in the peak
RB 33	Idar-Oberstein – Bad Kreuznach – Mainz (– Mainz Römisches Theater – Rüsselsheim – Frankfurt Airport – Frankfurt)	Some early and late trains
RB 75	Wiesbaden – Mainz Hbf – Mainz Römisches Theater – Groß-Gerau – Darmstadt – Dieburg – Aschaffenburg	Every 60 mins (30 in peak hours)

== Buses ==
The station is connected by the Mainz public transport network through two nearby bus stops:

- Bahnhof Römisches Theater/CineStar: lines 64, 65, 66E, 67E, 71, 92
- Zitadellenweg/Bahnhof Römisches Theater: lines 64, 65, 66E, 67E, 90, 92.

There are direct connections to Mainz Hauptbahnhof (lines 64, 65, 71, 90, 92) and to the centre of Mainz (lines 64, 65, 66E, 67E, 71, 90, 92).
