= Mainz-Kastel =

Kastel
- Borough of Wiesbaden
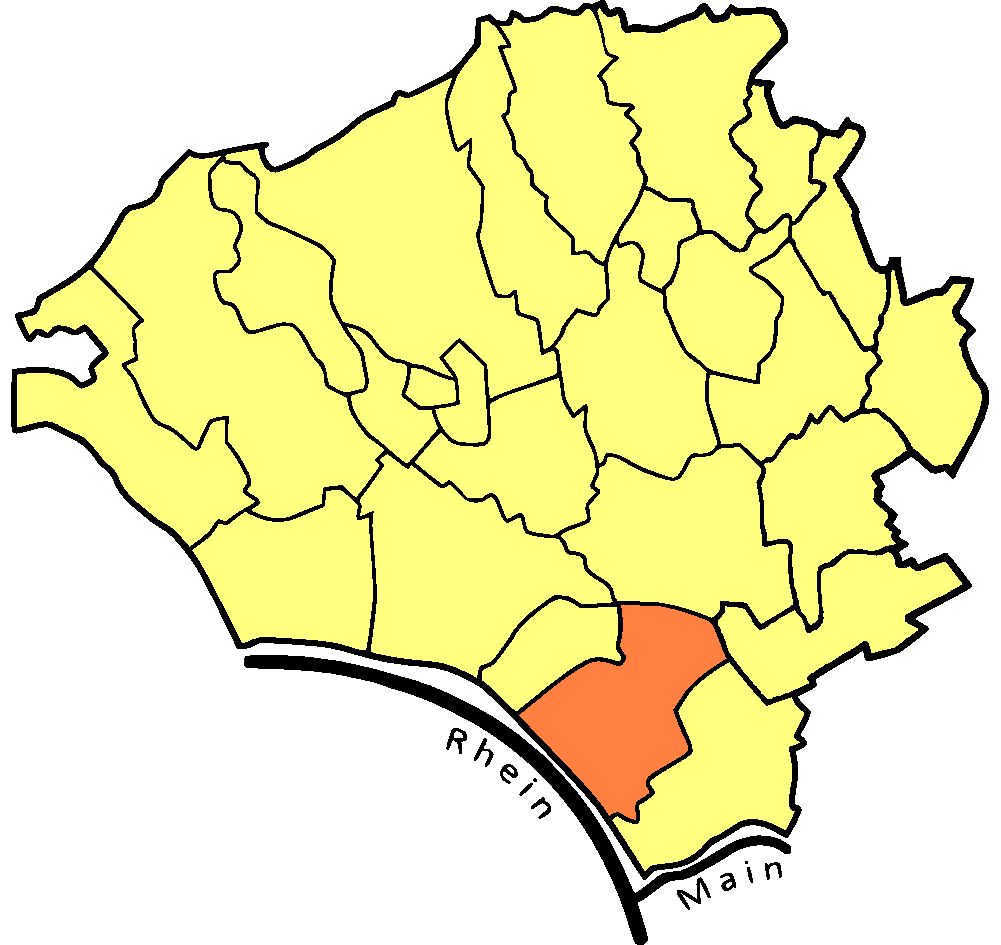
- Location of Kastel in Wiesbaden
- Interactive map of Kastel
- Location within Germany Location within Hesse
- Coordinates: 50°00′35″N 8°17′04″E
- Country: Germany
- State: Hesse
- District: Urban district
- City: Wiesbaden

Area
  - Total: 9.51 km^{2} (3.67 sq mi)

Population (2020-12-31)
  - Total: 13,353
  - Density: 1,400/km^{2} (3,640/sq mi)
- Time zone: UTC+01:00 (CET)
  - Summer (DST): UTC+02:00 (CEST)
- Postal codes: 55252
- Dialling codes: 06134
- Website: www.wiesbaden.de

Mainz-Kastel (German pronunciation: [ˈmaɪnts kasˈtɛl]) is a district of the city Wiesbaden, which is the capital of the German state Hesse in western Germany.

Kastel is the historical bridgehead of Mainz, the capital of the German state Rhineland-Palatinate and is located on the right side of the Rhine river. Kastel faces the historical center of Mainz and the two cities are connected by a road bridge. Kastel is located about one kilometer below the mouth of the river Main, where it flows into the Rhine.

In its long history Kastel repeatedly belonged to Mainz and was formally incorporated into that city on 1 April 1908. Since Mainz was part of the French occupation zone (formed after World War II) and Kastel was part of the American occupation zone, the Americans ordered that Kastel be brought within the administration of Wiesbaden. On 25 July 1945, Kastel was incorporated into Wiesbaden, the Hessian state capital, and has been part of it ever since.

The newly formed German federal states adapted the boundaries of the occupation zones. Therefore, Kastel is a district of Wiesbaden and part of the German state Hesse. Kastel is one of six districts of Mainz on the right-hand side of the Rhine which were separated from Mainz in this way. The separation from Mainz is the issue of intense debates by local patriots in three districts (Kastel, Amöneburg and Kostheim). Many Kastel residents feel like they belong to Mainz which reflects, apart from the administrative affiliation, the reality of everyday life. The city center of Wiesbaden is about ten kilometers from Kastel whereas the city center of Mainz is just on the opposite side of the Rhine. The three mentioned districts of Wiesbaden still bear the designation "Mainz- ..." because until today no closed formal legal act has been made up. The signs, when entering the districts, are a curiosity because they say "Federal State Capital Wiesbaden District Mainz-Kastel". On the other hand, many inhabitants of Kastel feel like they belong to the German state Hesse (Mainz was a part of the Grand Duchy of Hesse from 1815-World War II) and do not identify with Rhineland-Palatinate whatsoever.

Adolphus Busch, founder of Anheuser-Busch, was born in Kastel (now Mainz-Kastel) in 1839.

CB&I Lummus operated an office in Mainz-Kastel which has been bought by Alstom as of 30 October 2009.

The letter processing center for Deutsche Post in the greater Wiesbaden area is located in Mainz-Kastel.

== History ==
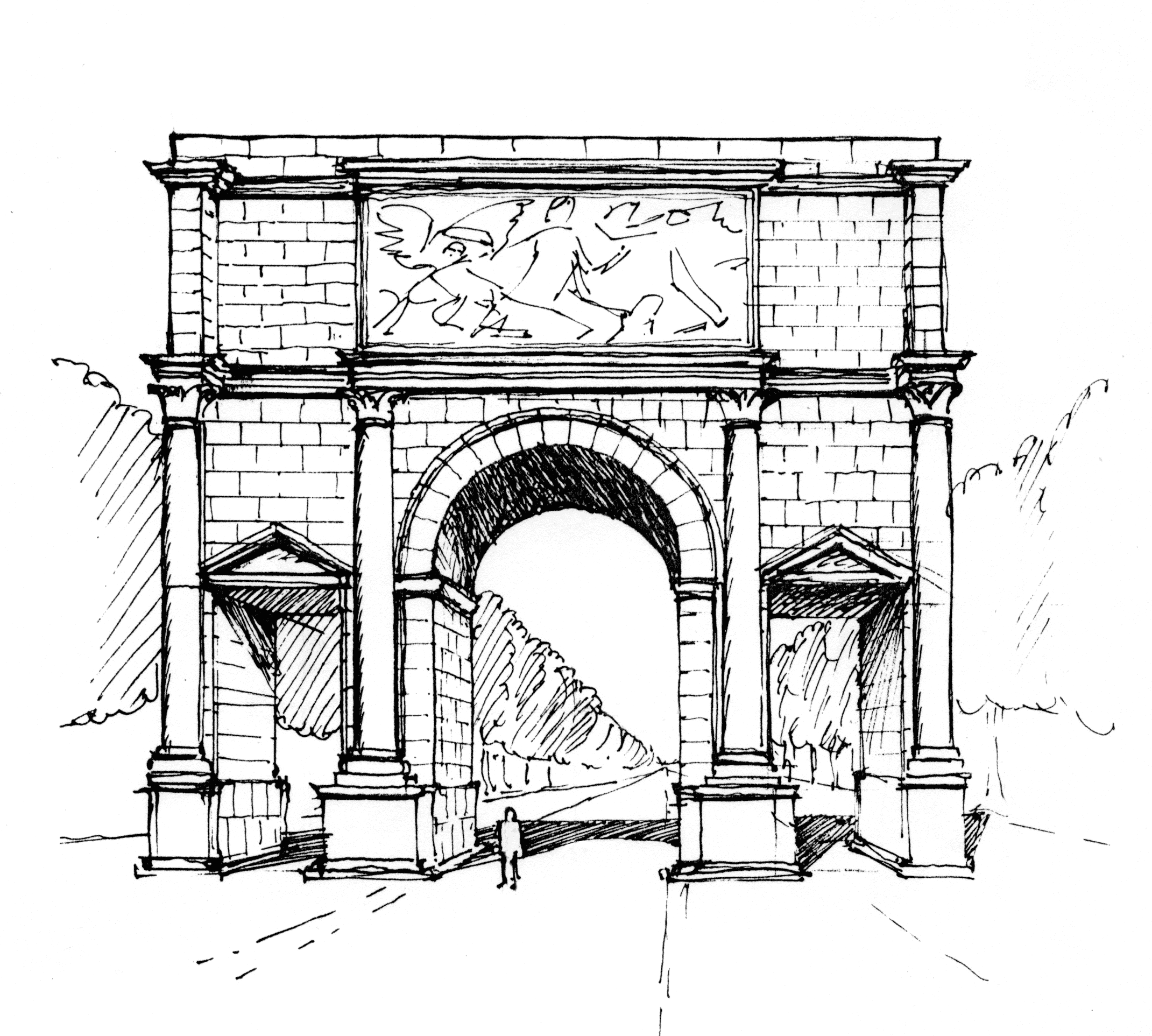
Reconstruction of the Roman triumphal arch whose foundations were found in Mainz-Kastel. It was built between 18 and 43 A.D.

Mainz-Kastel was founded about 11 BC. At that time, the Romans built a wooden bridge across the Rhine connecting Moguntiacum (Mainz) with a castle on the right bank of the river. The wooden construction was replaced by a stone bridge in 71, which lasted until about 406. From this time the remains of a Roman triumphal arch were found in Mainz-Kastel, built around 19 A.D.

In his Vita Karoli Magni Einhard counts the new Mainz-Kastel Rhine Bridge among Charlemagne's most important building achievements, along with the Palatine Chapel, Aachen, the Ingelheim Imperial Palace and the palace of Nijmegen.

In the cause of the bombing of Mainz in World War II Mainz-Kastel was subject to air raids.
