= Bischofsheim, Hesse =

Bischofsheim
- Municipality
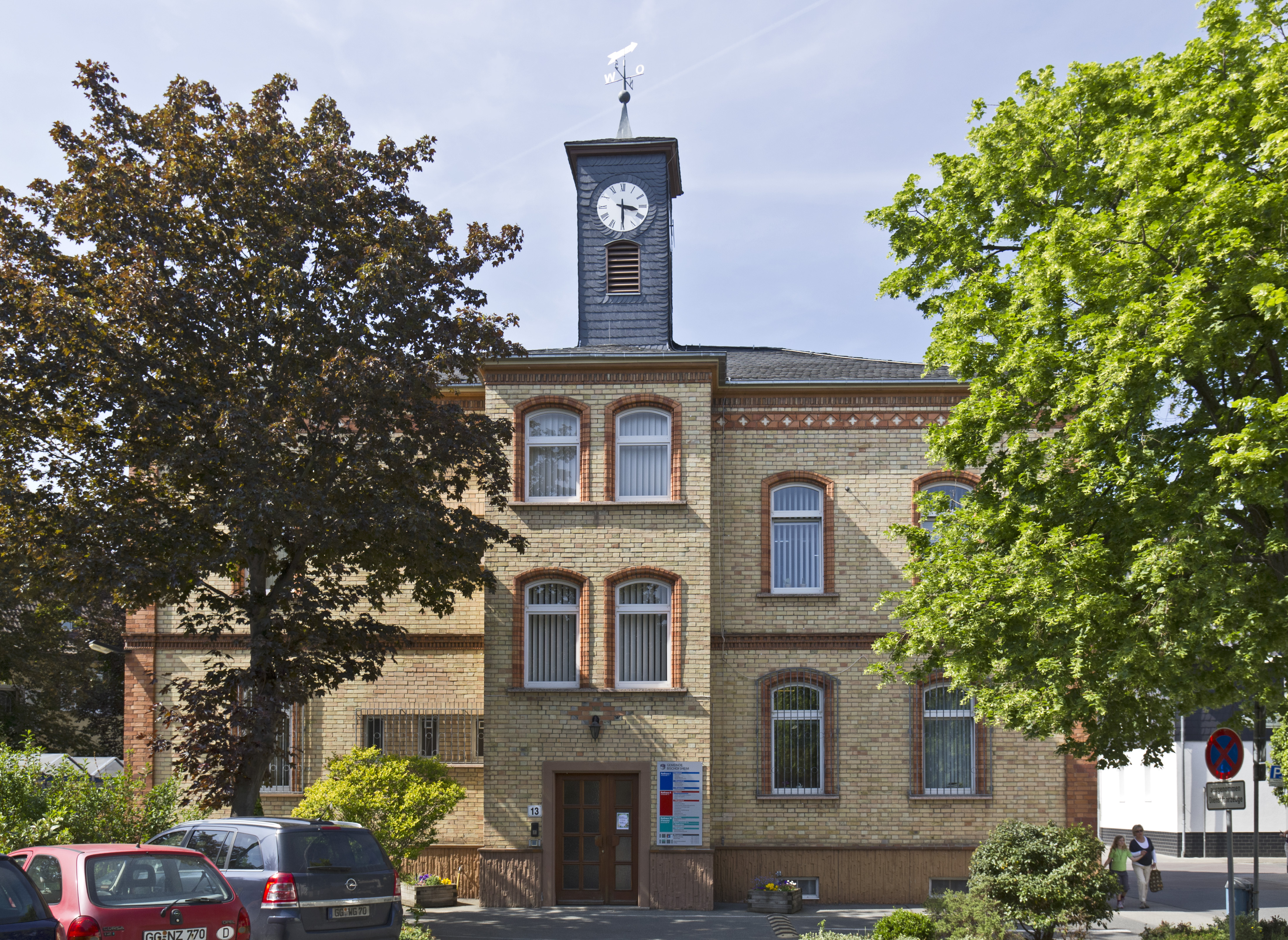
- Town hall

- Coat of arms

- Location of Bischofsheim within Groß-Gerau district
- Interactive map of Bischofsheim
- Location within Germany Location within Hesse
- Coordinates: 49°59′N 8°21′E
- Country: Germany
- State: Hesse
- Admin. region: Darmstadt
- District: Groß-Gerau

Government
  - Mayor (2023–29): Lisa Gößwein (SPD)

Area
  - Total: 9.03 km^{2} (3.49 sq mi)
- Elevation: 86 m (282 ft)

Population (2025-12-31)
  - Total: 13,034
  - Density: 1,440/km^{2} (3,740/sq mi)
- Time zone: UTC+01:00 (CET)
  - Summer (DST): UTC+02:00 (CEST)
- Postal codes: 65474
- Dialling codes: 06144
- Vehicle registration: GG
- Website: bischofsheim.de

Bischofsheim (German pronunciation: [ˈbɪʃɔfsˌhaɪm]) is a municipality in Groß-Gerau district in Hesse, Germany with a population of more than 13,000.

== Geography ==
=== Location ===
Bischofsheim lies south of the Main and east of the Rhine in the so-called Mainspitze triangle, a narrow piece of land between the Main and Rhine where the former empties into the latter.

=== Neighbouring municipalities ===
Bischofsheim borders in the north on the town of Hochheim (Main-Taunus-Kreis), in the east on the town of Rüsselsheim, and in the south and west on the municipality of Ginsheim-Gustavsburg.

=== Constituent communities ===
Bischofsheim has only one constituent community, nevertheless it has with "An den Sportstätten" and "Dr.-Hans-Böckler-Siedlung two by train tracks / motorway divided additional parts.

== History ==
In the Middle Ages, Bischofsheim was ruled by the Archbishop of Mainz, but fell to Hesse-Darmstadt in 1579. In 1930 it was incorporated to the city of Mainz, remaining a constituent community of that city until 1945. Due to its infrastructure Bischofsheim was subject to air raids bombing of Mainz in World War II. Since the American and French occupying powers severed the links between Mainz and the so-called Rechtsrheinische Stadtteile von Mainz (Mainz constituent communities on the Rhine's right bank) – the Rhine was the boundary between their two occupational zones – these six communities effectively ceased to be part of the city of Mainz. Whereas the three former constituent communities north of the Main were administered by Wiesbaden since then, Bischofsheim and neighbouring Ginsheim-Gustavsburg once again became independent municipalities in Groß-Gerau district.

== Politics ==
=== Coat of arms ===
Bischofsheim's civic coat of arms might heraldically be described thus: Party per fess, above, a lion rampant striped alternately three times argent and three times gules, armed and crowned Or, langued gules, below, a pair of pince-nez eyeglasses with frame sable.

The lion is the lion of Hesse, seen in Hesse's own arms, and many civic coats of arms throughout Hesse.

Mainz's arms

The eyeglasses are a mystery. It is not known how they became a symbol of Bischofsheim, but they first appeared in seals in the 16th century and afterwards on other things of civic importance, such as municipal limit markers. One suggestion is that they derive from the two-wheels-and-cross charge in Mainz's coat of arms, seen here.

Leave to bear these arms was granted by the People's State of Hesse (Volksstaat Hessen) on 27 October 1926.

=== Partnerships ===
- Dzierżoniów, Poland
- Crewe and Nantwich, United Kingdom

== Economy and infrastructure ==
=== Transport ===
Mainz-Bischofsheim station is the centre of a railway hub with a marshalling yard, called Mainz-Bischofsheim, as Bischofsheim was formerly part of Mainz. The hub itself is formed by a junction of the Mainz–Frankfurt and Wiesbaden–Darmstadt lines.

The community is directly reachable by Autobahnen A 60 and A 671.

Bischofsheim's location near two important rivers affords waterborne transportation as well.

== Sightseeing ==
Things worth seeing are the Baroque Evangelical church, the early modern Roman Catholic Christ the King church (Christkönigskirche) by Dominikus Böhm and the historic half-timbered houses. One of these, the Old Town Hall (Altes Rathaus), houses the local history museum.

== Synonyms ==
Bischofsheim is sometimes also called:

- Bischofsheim (Kreis Groß-Gerau), for instance, in the information given out by the Rhine-Main Transport Association (Rhein-Main-Verkehrsverbund);
- Mainz-Bischofsheim, for instance, in the information given out by Deutsche Bahn;
- Bischofsheim bei Rüsselsheim, for instance, in Deutsche Telekom AG's directories.
