= Mainz-Kostheim =

Coordinates: 50°00′10″N 8°18′20″E

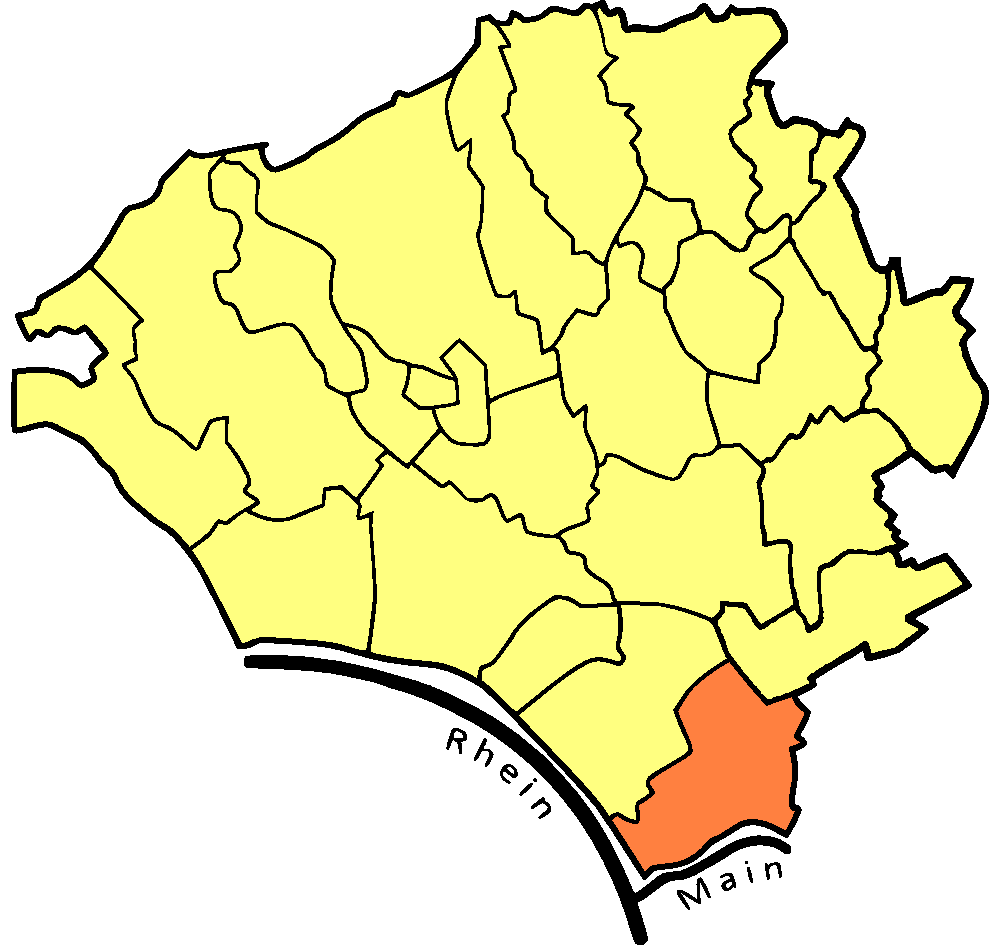
Location of Mainz-Kostheim

Mainz-Kostheim (German pronunciation: [ˈmaɪnts ˈkɔsthaɪm]) is a district administered by the city of Wiesbaden, Germany. Its population is 14,381 (As of 2020). Mainz-Kostheim was formerly a district of the city of Mainz, until the public administration by the city of Wiesbaden was decided on 10 August 1945. The reason for this had been the easy control of the Allied Occupation Zones in Germany, where the Rhine formed the border between the American sector and the French sector. Mainz-Kostheim faces the city of Mainz on the opposite shore of the Rhine river.

In 1184 Frederick I, Holy Roman Emperor held one of the biggest diets of the Middle Ages at the Maaraue in Kostheim, the Diet of Pentecost. Occasion had been the promotion to Knighthood of is both sons Henry hand Frederic, Duke of Swabia. During the Siege of Mainz by Prussian and Austrian troops in the Napoleonic Wars Kostheim had been severely damaged several times. In the cause of the bombing of Mainz in World War II Mainz-Kostheim was subject to air raids.

The Linde Group has been located in Kostheim before recent mergers, acquisitions and transition.

== Twin towns – sister cities ==
Mainz-Kostheim is twinned with:

- Sankt Veit an der Glan, Austria
