= Gonsenheim =

- Borough of Mainz
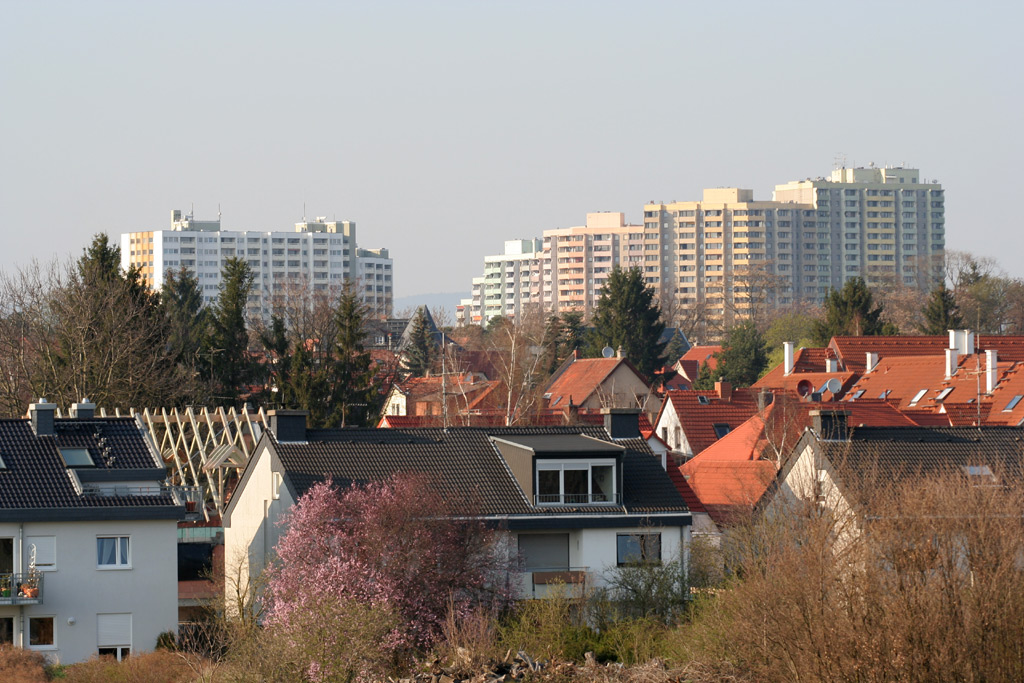
- Gonsenheim in 2005

- Coat of arms

- Location of Gonsenheim within Mainz
- Interactive map of Gonsenheim
- Location within Germany Location within Rhineland-Palatinate
- Coordinates: 50°0′N 8°12′E
- Country: Germany
- State: Rhineland-Palatinate
- District: Urban district
- Town: Mainz

Government
  - Mayor: Josef Aron (Greens)

Area
  - Total: 9.127 km^{2} (3.524 sq mi)
- Elevation: 115 m (377 ft)

Population (2024)
  - Total: 25,515
  - Density: 2,796/km^{2} (7,240/sq mi)
- Time zone: UTC+01:00 (CET)
  - Summer (DST): UTC+02:00 (CEST)
- Postal codes: 55124 + 55122
- Dialling codes: 06131
- Website: Gonsenheim.de

Gonsenheim (German pronunciation: [ˈɡɔnzn̩haɪm]; Rhenish Hessian: Gunsenum [ˈɡʊnzənʊm]) is a borough in the northwest corner of Mainz, Germany. With about 25,000 inhabitants, it is the second-most populated borough of Mainz, before Oberstadt and after Neustadt.

== History ==
=== Protohistory ===
The history of Gonsenheim reaches back to the Neolithic Era, the Chalcolithic Europe (2800 to 2400 B.C.). Finds of prehistoric people in Gonsenheim can be dated back to the late Neolithic period (2800 BC to 2200 BC). The Beilde pot find in the Gewann Auf dem Kästrich (today: "An der Ochsenwiese") near the Gonsenheim railway station is probably of supra-regional significance for Gonsenheim's prehistory. Here, in 1850, five polished flat Jadeite axes were found in the sand dunes typical of Gonsenheim, which can be assigned to the Late Neolithic period. These axes were of high material value at that time and were probably imported from the Maritime Alps. From the time of the hill grave culture (1600-1300/1200 BC) there are some grave finds from hill graves in Gonsenheim; the settlements belonging to them could not yet be located.

Traces of human settlements in Gonsenheim can be dated for the first time to the Late Bronze Age (Urnfield period, ca. 1200 to 750 BC). From this time there are secured settlement finds in the western Gonsbach valley. These settlement traces date back to the late Urnfield period or even to the early Iron Age or Hallstatt period, which began in 750 BC. The Hallstatt period was associated with a significant increase in the number of settlements in Mainz, including Gonsenheim. Traces of settlements from both the older and the younger Hallstatt periods were found, for example on the lower slope of Gleisberg or Mühlweg.

In the younger Iron or Latène Age (approx. 450 BC to 15 BC) the Gonsbachtal seems to have been uninhabited again according to current knowledge. It was reserved for a Celtic settlement of the later Latène period in Mainz-Weisenau to become the nucleus and eponym of the Roman Mogontiacum.

=== Romans ===
When Mogontiacum belonged to the Roman Empire, the Roman road Mogontiacum-Bingium (Bingen) was near Gonsenheim. At Gleisberg a villa rustica with numerous building and small finds such as mosaic floors, wall plastering, remains of a Roman bath house and a water pipe belonging to it could be found. Numerous other small finds such as coins, terracottas, glass vessels in many parts of the village as well as the presence of Roman cremation tombs in the area of today's industrial estate prove the presence of the Romans in Gonsenheim. In the valley of the Gonsbach in 2013/2014 extensive structural remains from the time around the 4th century were found during renaturation work, which could be identified by the responsible archaeologists as a stud farm, which was possibly operated by the military stationed in Mogontiacum.

After the collapse of the Limes in the middle of the 3rd century, at the latest from the 4th and 5th centuries onwards, the Roman-Celtic rural population of Gonsenheim probably fled to the better fortified town of Mogontiacum.

Its importance grew as a human settlement which became Gonsenheim by the foundation of a Merovingian settlement in the 6th century. This foundation expanded quickly due to the favorable location for agriculture. In 1938 Gonsenheim was suburbanised as a part of Mainz.

Nowadays, Gonsenheim is still partially rustic and rural in character, despite its nearly 70 years affiliation to Mainz. Besides the old village core around St. Stephans church and the Renaissance town hall, there are the workers' quarters and mansions established in the middle of the 19th century, the tower blocks, with about 6.000 people living there, the commercial zone „Am Hemel“ and much nature like the small, but geo-ecologically and botanical supra-regionally important nature reserve of Mainz Sand Dunes „Großer Sand“ as well as parts of the Lennebergwald, the connected forest in Rheinhessen.

=== Franks ===
Despite the extensive pre-Franconian history, the foundation of a permanently inhabited settlement in Gonsenheim dates back to Franconian times. The founder was probably a Franconian nobleman named Gunzo, who founded a larger farm in the area of today's Gonsenheim as the germ cell for the later settlement. The establishment of villages with the name ending -heim is typical for settlement foundations in the course of the so-called Frankish colonisation, which took place in the late 5th to 7th centuries. Gonsenheim is one of the villages founded in other Mainz suburbs such as Hechtsheim, Bretzenheim, Ebersheim or Laubenheim, which also date from this period.

Already on 13 November 774 Gonsenheim was mentioned for the first time as "Guntzinheim" in a deed of donation of King Charlemagne to the monastery Fulda. In another deed of donation to the abbey of Lorsch dated 30 May 775 (deed no. 1090 dated 30 May 775), the town is named "Gunsenheim im Wormsgau". A donation of a certain Teurath, who gave the abbey five yokes of farmland and a meadow in the Gunsenheim district, was documented. Further, partly extensive donations to various monasteries (above all Lorsch) followed, especially in the Carolingian period, when Gonsenheim was a "royal estate". Altogether Gonsenheim is mentioned in five documents in the 8th century.

=== Gonsenheim today ===
After its incorporation into Mainz in 1938, Gonsenheim's history as an independent village ended. Daily life did not change significantly; Gonsenheim remained a rural location.

During the bombing of Mainz in World War II Gonsenheim was bombarded several times, causing nearly 600 civilian casualties. On 21 March 1945 American forces freed the suburb, ending the Third Reich for Gonsenheim.

== Geography ==
The following communities border on Gonsenheim clockwise:

in the north Mombach, in the east Hartenberg-Münchfeld, south Bretzenheim (Mainz) and Drais, in the west Finthen and northwest Budenheim. Gonsenheim lies in the Mainz basin on the Rheinhessen Plateau. The Gonsbach and its tributaries flow through the boroughs of Layenhof, Finthen, Gonsenheim and Mombach.

=== Climate ===
Like the rest of Rheinhessen (ROR), Gonsenheim is protected by Hunsrück, Taunus, Odenwald and Donnersberg. The annual rainfall is below 500 liters per square meter (19.7 in), which comes near to a semi-arid to Mediterranean climate.
