= Timeline of Mainz =

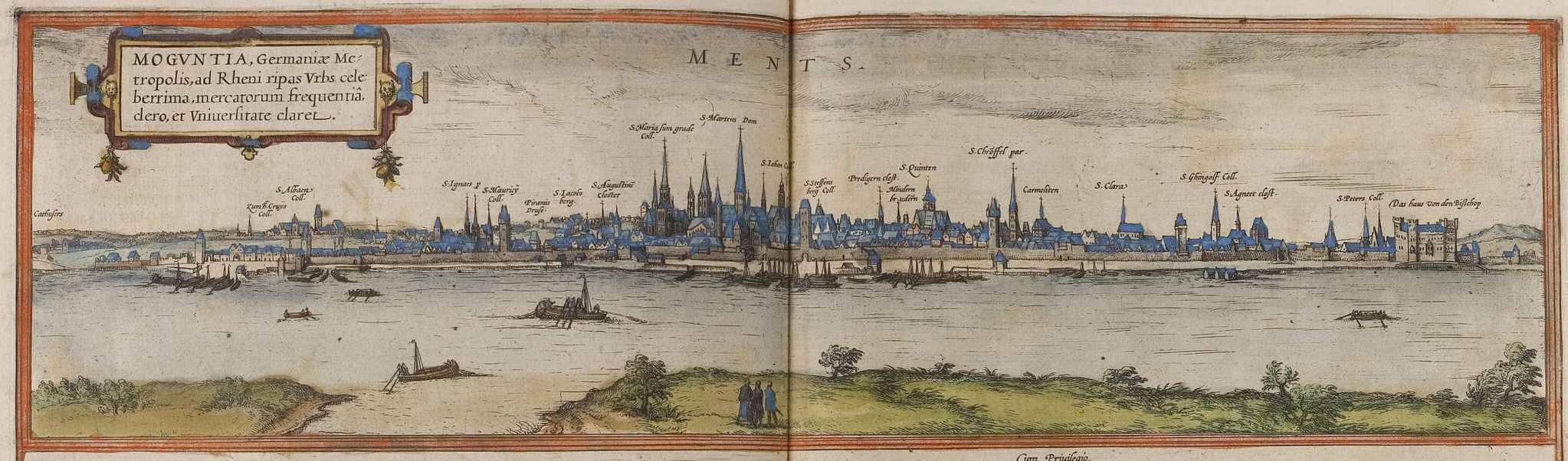
Mainz in the 16th century

The following is a timeline of the history of the city of Mainz, Germany.

== Prior to 19th century ==
- 13/12 BC - Roman fort Mogontiacum built.
- 314 - Roman Catholic Diocese of Mainz established (approximate date).
- 406 - Battle of Mainz (406).
- 790s - Benedictine St. Alban's Abbey active (approximate date).
- 813 - Carolingian rhine bridge (Mainz) Rheinbrücke Karls des Großen (bridge) burns down.
- 848 - Gottschalk of Orbais convicted of heresy while in Mainz.
- 952 - Forces of Otto I, Holy Roman Emperor fought forces of Liudolf, Duke of Swabia and Conrad, Duke of Lorraine in Mainz for 2 months.
- 1009 - Mainz Cathedral finished and burnt down during inauguration.
- 1160 - "Citizens revolted against archbishop Arnold of Selenhofen."
- 1163 - City wall dismantled.
- 1184 - Diet of Pentecost occurs.
- 1244 - Free City of Mainz established.
- 1314 - Dominikanerkloster Mainz church built.
- 1340 - St. Stephen's Church built.
- 1370 - Public clock installed (approximate date).
- 1454/5 - Johannes Gutenberg prints a Bible using movable type and a printing press; printing revolution launched.
- 1461/2 - Mainz Diocesan Feud occurs.
- 1477 - University of Mainz founded.
- 1481 - Martinsburg, Mainz (castle) built.
- 1561 - Jesuit Kurfürstliches Kolleg (school) founded.
- 1631 - City occupied by Swedish forces during the Thirty Years' War.
- 1604 - Old arsenal built.
- 1644 - City occupied by French forces during the Thirty Years' War.
- 1660 - Citadel built in the Fortress of Mainz.
- 1670 - Schönborner Hof (Mainz) built.
- 1678 - Electoral Palace, Mainz built.
- 1689 - Siege of Mainz (1689) during the Nine Years' War.
- 1736 - Arsenal built.
- 1750 - Bassenheimer Hof built.
- 1752 - Osteiner Hof built on the Thiermarkt.
- 1754 - Churfürstlich Mayntzische Academie nützlicher Wissenschaften (scholarly society) established.
- 1770 - Schott Music publisher in business.
- 1781 - Altmünster Cistercian abbey dissolved.
- 1792 - October: Siege of Mainz (1792) by the French Revolutionary Armies under Adam-Philippe de Custine.
- 1793
  - March: Republic of Mainz established.
  - 14 April: Siege of Mainz (1793) begins.
  - 23 July: Siege ends; Republic dissolved.
- 1797 - Mainz "ceded to France by the Treaty of Campo Formio."
- 1798 - University of Mainz suppressed by the French.

== 19th century ==
- 1803 - "Hall of Antiques" exhibited.
- 1805 - Stadtbibliothek Mainz (library) established.
- 1814
  - Siege of Mainz (1814) defended by French forces under Charles Antoine Morand.
  - Mainz becomes part of Germany again.
- 1817 - Mainzer Turnverein von 1817 (sport club) formed.
- 1827 - Sparkasse Mainz (bank) founded.
- 1833 - Staatstheater Mainz built.
- 1837
  - Mainzer Ranzengarde (carnival society) established, the first of many.^{(de)}
  - Gutenberg monument^{(de)} erected on the Gutenbergplatz (Mainz).
- 1838
  - Mainzer Rosenmontagszug (parade) begins.
  - Mainzer Carneval-Verein (another carnival society) established.
- 1844 - Mainzer Altertumsverein (historical society) founded.
- 1845 - Mainzer Zeitschrift history journal begins publication.
- 1848 - Political unrest.
- 1853 - Mainz–Ludwigshafen railway begins operating.
- 1854 - Mainzer Anzeiger newspaper in publication (founded in 1850 as an advertisement paper)
- 1857 - 18 November: Pulverturm (Mainz) explodes, damaging the Kästrich neighborhood.
- 1861 - Population: 41,279.
- 1862
  - South railway bridge built.
  - Mainzer Volksbank founded.
- 1863 - Main Railway (Frankfurt-Mainz) begins operating.
- 1866 - Neutorkaserne barracks built (approximate date).
- 1871 - Alzey–Mainz railway begins operating.
- 1873 - Development of Mainz-Neustadt begins.
- 1884 - Mainz Hauptbahnhof and Mainz Süd train stations, and Stadthalle (Mainz) built.
- 1885 - Rheinbrücke (bridge) built.
- 1887 - Zollhafen (port) opens near city.
- 1890 - Population: 72,059.
- 1899 - Rheinischer Camera-Klub founded.

== 20th century ==
- 1901 - Gutenberg Museum opens.
- 1904 - Kaiserbrücke (railway bridge) built.
- 1905
  - 1. FSV Mainz 05 football club formed.
  - Population: 91,124.
- 1907 - Gustav Stresemann Business School founded.
- 1908 - Kastel becomes part of Mainz.
- 1912 - Hauptsynagoge Mainz (synagogue) built.
- 1913 - Church of the Sacred Heart built.
- 1919 - Population: 107,930.
- 1927 - Theresianum Gymnasium Mainz (school) founded.
- 1929 - Stadion am Bruchweg (stadium) opens.
- 1930 - Bischofsheim becomes part of Mainz.
- 1938 - Gonsenheim becomes part of Mainz.
- 1941 - Bombing of Mainz in World War II begins.
- 1945
  - Bombing of Mainz in World War II ends.
  - Mainz-Amöneburg becomes part of nearby city Wiesbaden.
- 1946 - University of Mainz reactivated.
- 1947 - Allgemeine Zeitung (Mainz) newspaper in publication.
- 1949 - Academy of Sciences and Literature founded.
- 1951 - Landtag of Rhineland-Palatinate begins meeting in the Deutschhaus Mainz.
- 1953 - Rabanus-Maurus-Gymnasium (school) active.
- 1958 - Iron Tower reconstructed.
- 1961 - Wood Tower reconstructed.
- 1962 - Schierstein Bridge built.
- 1963 - Fastnachtsbrunnen (Mainz) erected on the Schillerplatz.
- 1964 - Mainz-Lerchenberg borough created.
- 1967 - Mittelrheinischen Landesmuseum Mainz established.
- 1968 - Rheingoldhalle (Mainz) built.
- 1981 - Mainz (journal) begins publication.
- 1985 - Ancient Roman gate, Mainz discovered in Kästrich.
- 1987 - Mainzer Rhein-Zeitung (newspaper) begins publication.
- 1989 - Mainz-Altstadt borough new circumscripted.
- 1997 - Jens Beutel becomes mayor.

== 21st century ==
- 2010
  - February: Storm.
  - New synagogue Mainz built.
- 2011 - Coface Arena opens.
- 2012 - Michael Ebling becomes mayor.
- 2013 - Population: 204,268.

== See also ==
- Mainz history
- History of Mainz
- List of mayors of Mainz
- List of archbishops of Mainz until 1803
- List of heritage sites in Mainz

Other cities in the state of Rhineland-Palatinate:^{(de)}

- Timeline of Koblenz

== Bibliography ==
=== in English ===
- Monsieur de Blainville (1757), "Mayence", Travels through Holland, Germany, Switzerland, but especially Italy, vol. 1, Translated by Turnbull, London: John Noon and Joseph Noon, OCLC 698845221
- Abraham Rees (1819), "Mentz", The Cyclopaedia, London: Longman, Hurst, Rees, Orme & Brown, hdl:2027/mdp.39015054498178
- Edward Augustus Domeier (1830), "Mayence", Descriptive Road-Book of Germany, London: Samuel Leigh, hdl:2027/hvd.hx167e
- William Henry Overall, ed. (1870). "Mayence". Dictionary of Chronology. London: William Tegg. hdl:2027/uc2.ark:/13960/t9m32q949.
- "Mainz". Handbook for North Germany. Murray's hand-book Rhine & North Germany. London: J. Murray. 1886. hdl:2027/hvd.hn1imr.
- "Mainz". Chambers's Encyclopaedia. London. 1901. hdl:2027/uc2.ark:/13960/t7zk5ms79.
- "Mainz" . Encyclopædia Britannica. Vol. 17 (11th ed.). 1910. pp. 444–445.
- Herbermann, Charles George (1910). "Mainz". Catholic Encyclopedia. New York.
- Benjamin Vincent (1910), "Mentz", Haydn's Dictionary of Dates (25th ed.), London: Ward, Lock & Co., hdl:2027/uc2.ark:/13960/t41r6xh8t
- "Mayence", The Rhine, including the Black Forest & the Vosges, Leipzig: Karl Baedeker, 1911, OCLC 21888483 + 1882 ed.
- Trudy Ring, ed. (1995). "Mainz". Northern Europe. International Dictionary of Historic Places. Fitzroy Dearborn. p. 477+. ISBN 978-1-136-63944-9.
- John M. Jeep, ed. (2001). "Mainz". Medieval Germany: an Encyclopedia. Garland Publishing. ISBN 0-8240-7644-3.
- Colum Hourihane, ed. (2012). "Mainz". Grove Encyclopedia of Medieval Art and Architecture. Oxford University Press. ISBN 978-0-19-539536-5.

=== in German ===
- Heinrich Brühl (1829). Mainz: Geschichtlich, Topographisch und Malerisch (in German). Mainz: Florian Kupferberg.
- Mainz und seine Umgegend (in German). Darmstadt: Gustav Georg Lange. 1840.
- Karl Anton Schaab [in German] (1841). Geschichte der Stadt Mainz (in German). Mainz: F. Kupferberg.
- Karl Klein (historian) [in German] (1866). "Geschichte von Mainz". Das Großherzogthum Hessen historisch und geographisch für Schule und Haus [History and Geography of the Grand Duchy of Hesse for School and Home] (in German). Mainz: Wirth.
- Mainz. Die Chroniken der Deutschen Städte (in German). Vol. 17. Leipzig: S. Hirzel Verlag. 1881–1882 – via HathiTrust.
- "Mainz". Kleiner Führer für die Rhein-Reise von Köln bis Frankfurt [Short guide for a trip along the Rhine from Cologne to Frankfurt]. Griebens Reisebücher (in German). Vol. 75. Berlin: Albert Goldschmidt. 1900 – via Google Books.
- Ernst Neeb [in German] (1905). Verzeichnis der Kunstdenkmäler der Stadt Mainz (in German). Mainz: Verlag des Altertumsvereins.
- P. Krauss und E. Uetrecht, ed. (1913). "Mainz". Meyers Deutscher Städteatlas [Meyer's Atlas of German Cities] (in German). Leipzig: Bibliographisches Institut.
- Franz Dumont; et al. (1999). Mainz: Die Geschichte der Stadt (in German) (2nd ed.). Verlag Philipp von Zabern. ISBN 3-8053-2000-0.
- Wolfgang Adam; Siegrid Westphal, eds. (2012). "Mainz". Handbuch kultureller Zentren der Frühen Neuzeit: Städte und Residenzen im alten deutschen Sprachraum (in German). De Gruyter. pp. 1391+. ISBN 978-3-11-029555-9.
