= Franz Dumont =

German historian

Franz Dumont (22 January 1945 – 3 November 2012) was a German historian.

== Life ==
Born in Waldbröl, Dumont lived in Mainz from 1954 onwards and took his Abitur at the Rabanus-Maurus-Gymnasium in Mainz in 1964. During his school years, he had already studied the history of Mainz in the late 18th century on the advice of his history teacher. He studied history, classical philology, philosophy, geography and political science at the Bonn University and the Johannes Gutenberg University Mainz from 1964 to 1970. From 1971 to 1977, he was a research assistant at the University of Mainz and received his doctorate in 1978 under Hermann Weber with a thesis on the Republic of Mainz of 1792/93. From 1978 to 1979, Dumont was a research assistant at the Archive for Christian Democratic Policy in St. Augustin near Bonn. From 1979 until his death in 2012 at the age of 67, Dumont was a research assistant at the Academy of Sciences and Literature. In December 2008, he was awarded the Archive for Christian Democratic Policy by the city of Mainz Römisches Kaisermedaillon.

His main areas of research were the life and work of the anatomist and naturalist Samuel Thomas von Soemmerring and the explorer Georg Forster, the Enlightenment in Catholic Germany, Germany and the French Revolution, especially the Mainz Republic and the history of the left bank of the Rhine in 1792 and from 1798 to 1814 as well as Mainz's medical and history of Mainz's city. In 2007, he published the history of his 450-year-old grammar school with Ferdinand Scherf and Meike Hensel-Grobe. Together with Ferdinand Scherf and Friedrich Schütz (1998) and with Ferdinand Scherf (2010) he was the editor of two standard works on the history of Mainz. Dumont died on 3 November 2012 at the age of 67. On 9 November 2012 he was buried at the Mainz-Hechtsheim cemetery.

== Publications ==
A complete compilation can be found at Susanne Speth's Verzeichnis der Schriften von Franz Dumont. In Mainzer Zeitschrift. Vol. 108, 2013, pp. IX–XVII.

Monographs

- Die Mainzer Republik von 1792/93. Studien zur Revolutionierung in Rheinhessen und der Pfalz (Alzeyer Geschichtsblätter. Sonderheft. 19). Publisher of the Rheinhessische Druckwerkstätte, Alzey 1982, ISBN 3-87854-035-3 (Zugleich: Mainz, Universität, Dissertation, 1978; 2nd, extended edition. ibid 1993, ISBN 3-87854-090-6).

Publisher

- Samuel Thomas Soemmerring: Werke. Founded by Gunter Mann. Edited by Jost Benedum and Werner Friedrich Kümmel.
  - Vol. 18: Briefwechsel 1761/65 – October 1784. Fischer, Stuttgart among others 1996, ISBN 3-437-11702-5;
  - Vol. 19: Briefwechsel 1784–1792. Part 1: November 1784 – December 1786. Fischer, Stuttgart among others 1997, ISBN 3-437-25366-2;
  - Vol. 19: Briefwechsel 1784–1792. Part 2: January 1787 – Oktober 1792. Fischer, Stuttgart among others 1998, ISBN 3-437-25368-9;
  - Vol. 20: Briefwechsel. November 1792 – April 1805. Schwabe, Basel 2001, ISBN 3-7965-1738-2;
  - Vol. 23: Tagebücher. 1804/05–1812. Part 1: Frankfurt, Januar – März 1804, Munich, April 1805 – December 1808. Schwabe, Basel 2004, ISBN 3-7965-1932-6.
- with Ferdinand Scherf and Friedrich Schütz: Mainz. Die Geschichte der Stadt. Philipp von Zabern, Mainz 1998, ISBN 3-8053-2000-0.
- with Ferdinand Scherf: Mainz – Menschen, Bauten, Ereignisse. Eine Stadtgeschichte. Philipp von Zabern, Mainz 2010, ISBN 978-3-8053-4247-6.
