= Politikoffee =

Political forum in Cambodia

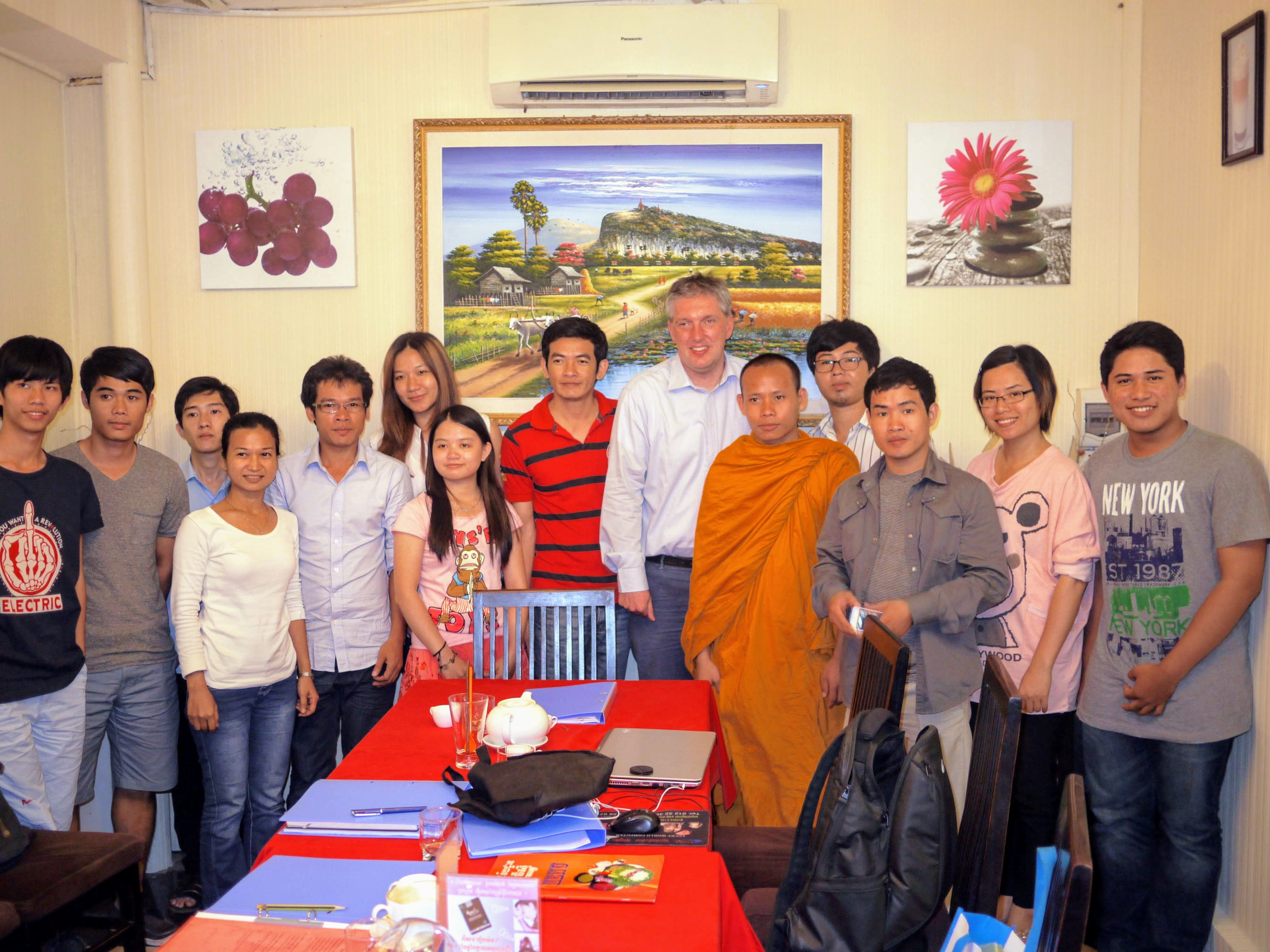
Denis Schrey, former country director of Konrad Adenauer Foundation in Cambodia, was the guest speaker at a Politikoffee forum organized on 31 August 2013.

Politikoffee is a weekly forum that discusses politics and youth-related issues in Phnom Penh, Cambodia. It was founded by Ou Ritthy, Chheng Channy and other colleagues in 2011. The forum has hosted a number of expert speakers through the years, including monks, women's rights activists, teachers, diplomats and social analysts. The forum also features prominent political figures to stimulate debate regarding issues of national interest. In the recent years, Politikoffee has covered issues ranging from human rights, politics and non-violence, electoral reforms and Cambodia-China relations, among others. The forum is currently being held at the Cambodia office of Konrad Adenauer Foundation.

In response to growing political tensions in Cambodia in November 2017, Politikoffee announced suspension of its meetings, however chose to restore the meetup in January 2018 as the political climate cooled down.
