= Timeline of Koblenz =

The following is a timeline of the history of Koblenz, Germany.

== Prior to 19th century ==
- 9 BCE – Military post established by Roman Drusus (approximate date).
- 1018 CE – Henry II, Holy Roman Emperor gives Koblenz to Archbishop of Trier.
- 1208 – Church of St. Castor built.
- 1254 – Town walls built.
- 1344 – Stone bridge built over Mosel.
- 1359 – Koblenzer Schützengesellschaft (militia) formed.
- 1469 – Population: 1,193.
- 1688 – Town besieged by French forces.
- 1698 – Jesuit College built.
- 1725 – Merchants' Hall restored.
- 1768 – Clemens Wenceslaus of Saxony becomes Archbishop-Elector of Trier
- 1778 – Population: 7,475.
- 1786 – Electoral Palace built.
- 1794 – Town taken by French forces.
- 1798 – Koblenz becomes "chief town of the Rhine and Mosel department."

== 19th century ==
- 1813 – Johann Josef Mazza becomes mayor.
- 1814 – Town occupied by Russian forces.
- 1815 – Koblenz Fortress construction begins near town.
- 1822 – Town becomes seat of the Rhine province.
- 1827 – Bürgerbibliothek (town library) founded.
- 1832 – Ehrenbreitstein Fortress built near town.
- 1840 – Population: 18,387.
- 1849 – Coblenzer Zeitung newspaper in publication.
- 1858 – Koblenz-Lützel station opens.
- 1864 – Pfaffendorf Bridge built.
- 1885 – Population: 31,669.
- 1897 – Statue of Wilhelm I installed on the Deutsches Eck.

== 20th century ==
- 1902 – Koblenz Hauptbahnhof (railway station) opens.
- 1905 – Population: 53,902.
- 1919 – Population: 56,676.
- 1933 – Population: 65,257.
- 1934
  - Koblenz radio transmitter erected.
  - TuS Koblenz football club formed.
- 1935 – Thingplatz and Stadion Oberwerth (stadium) inaugurated.
- 1943 – Koblenz becomes capital of Koblenz-Trier Gau.
- 1946
  - Koblenz becomes part of the Rhineland-Palatinate.
  - Josef Schnorbach becomes mayor.
- 1953 – Pfaffendorf Bridge rebuilt.
- 1961 – Population: 99,240.
- 1976 – Fernmeldeturm Koblenz (telecommunications tower) erected near city.
- 1991 – City partnered with Austin, Texas, USA.
- 1992 – 2000th anniversary of founding of Koblenz.
- 1994 – Eberhard Schulte-Wissermann becomes mayor.

== 21st century ==
- 2001 – DB Museum opens.
- 2004 – Tahir Mosque (Koblenz) opens.
- 2010 – Joachim Hofmann-Göttig becomes mayor.
- 2011
  - Koblenz Stadtmitte station opens.
  - City hosts Federal Horticultural Show 2011.
- 2012 – Population: 109,779.

== See also ==
- Koblenz history
- History of Koblenz
- Goloring, Bronze Age (1200–800 BCE) earthwork near Koblenz
- List of Archbishop-Electors of Trier

Other cities in the state of Rhineland-Palatinate:^{(de)}

- Timeline of Mainz

== Bibliography ==
=== in English ===
- Monsieur de Blainville (1757), "Coblentz", Travels through Holland, Germany, Switzerland, but especially Italy, translated by Turnbull, London: John Noon
- "Coblenz" . Encyclopædia Britannica. Vol. 6 (11th ed.). 1910. pp. 612–613.
- "Coblenz", The Rhine, Leipzig: Karl Baedeker, 1911, OCLC 21888483 (+ 1882 ed.)
- John M. Jeep, ed. (2001). "Coblenz". Medieval Germany: an Encyclopedia. Garland Publishing. ISBN 0-8240-7644-3.

=== in German ===
- Wilhelm Arnold Günther (1813). Topographische Geschichte der Stadt Coblenz von ihrem Entstehen bis zum Schlusse des 18ten Jahrhunderts (in German). Coblenz.
- "Coblenz". Biblioteca geographica: Verzeichniss der seit der Mitte des vorigen Jahrhunderts bis zu Ende des Jahres 1856 in Deutschland (in German). Leipzig: Wilhelm Engelmann. 1858. (bibliography)
- Julius Wegeler (1882), Beiträge zur Geschichte der Stadt Coblenz (in German), Coblenz: J. Schuth
- "Koblenz". Brockhaus' Konversations-Lexikon (in German) (14th ed.). Leipzig: Brockhaus. 1896. hdl:2027/njp.32101064064569.
- Max Bär, ed. (1898), Urkunden und akten zur geschichte der verfassung und verwaltung der stadt Koblenz bis zum jahre 1500 [Records for the history of the administration of the city of Koblenz to the year 1500] (in German), Bonn: H. Behrendt, OCLC 29072849, OL 6534538M
- "Koblenz". Kleiner Führer für die Rhein-Reise von Köln bis Frankfurt [Short guide for a trip along the Rhine from Cologne to Frankfurt]. Griebens Reisebücher (in German). Vol. 75. Berlin: Albert Goldschmidt. 1900 – via Google Books.
- Eduard Ausfeld (1903). Übersicht über die bestände des K. Staatsarchivs zu Coblenz [Overview of the holdings of the State Archives at Coblenz]. Mitteilungen der K. Preussischen Archivverwaltung (in German). Leipzig: S. Hirzel.
- Paul Clemen, ed. (1937). Kunstdenkmäler der Stadt Koblenz. Die Kunstdenkmäler der Rheinprovinz (in German). Vol. 20.
