= Siege of Mainz =

Siege of Mainz may refer to:

- Siege of Mainz (1689), a siege under Jacques Henri de Durfort de Duras during the Nine Years' War
- Siege of Mainz (1792), a siege by the French Revolutionary Armies under Custine
- Siege of Mainz (1793), a siege by the armies of the First Coalition, recapture by the French and major destruction to the city architecture
- Battle of Mainz, a 1795 siege of the city by the French Revolutionary Armies
- Siege of Mainz (1814), a siege under Charles Antoine Morand by the armies of the Sixth Coalition which damaged Mainz-Kostheim

== See also ==
- Timeline of Mainz
