= Beutel =

Beutel is a surname. Notable people with the surname include:

- Bill Beutel (1930–2006), American television reporter, journalist and anchor
- Hans-Dieter Beutel (born 1962), professional tennis player
- Jens Beutel (1946–2019), German politician, mayor of Mainz
- Lothar Beutel (1902–1986), German pharmacist
