= Johannisnacht, Mainz =

Events in Rhineland-Palatinate

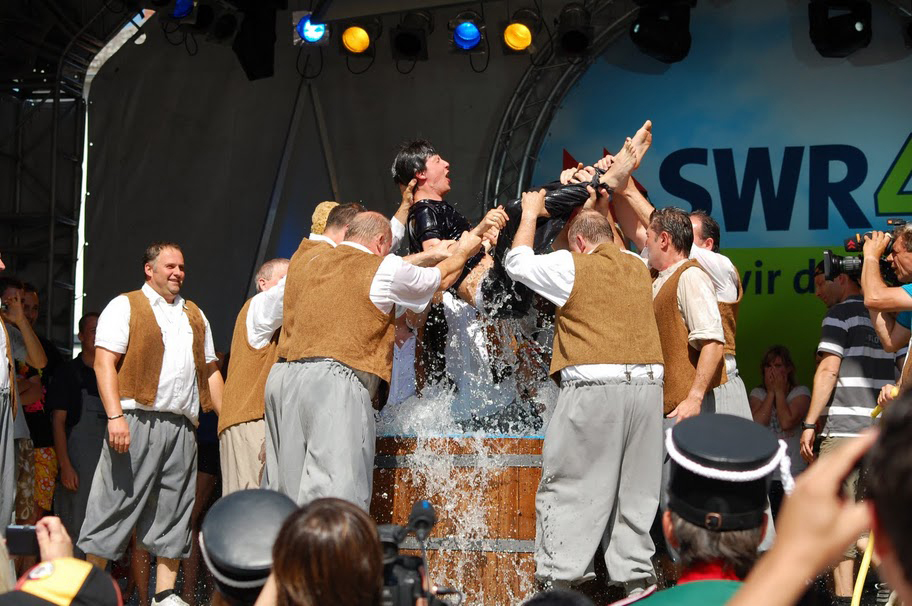
Mainzer Johannisnacht 2014, Gautschen at the Liebfrauenplatz

The Johannisnacht (St. John's Night) was celebrated in Mainz, Rhineland-Palatinate, Germany, first in 1968 in its extended form. Besides Mainz carnival and Weinmarkt it is one of three big Volksfest events in Mainz. The feast was initiated to commemorate the Johannes Gutenberg who died 500 years before and to improve the image of Mainz as a town of the art of printing. The Johannisnacht takes place annually during four days around Johannistag (St. John's Day, 24 June). It is attended by more than 500,000 people each year.

== History ==
Besides the sophisticated academic celebrations to Gutenberg's 500th anniversary of death in 1968, Karl Delorme, also a printer and then head of the Mainz social affairs department, picked up an old printers' tradition: to perform a public printer's "baptism", the so-called "Gautschen". This act is supposed to cleanse all sins during the apprenticeship, and to wash any remaining lead dust. Designed as a Volksfest, this was intended to foster Johannes Gutenbergs commemoration. The "Mainzer Johannisnacht" developed its own distinct character over the 50 years since. It is celebrated in the heart of the Old Town and on the banks of the Rhine.

== Litérature ==
- Günter Schenk: Die Mainzer Johannisnacht. in: Mainz. Vierteljahreshefte für Kultur, Politik, Wirtschaft, Geschichte. Nummer 2. Jahrgang 1981. Verlag H. Schmidt Mainz, p. 48–51, ISSN 0720-5945
