= Herman-Hartmut Weyel =

German politician (1933–2021)

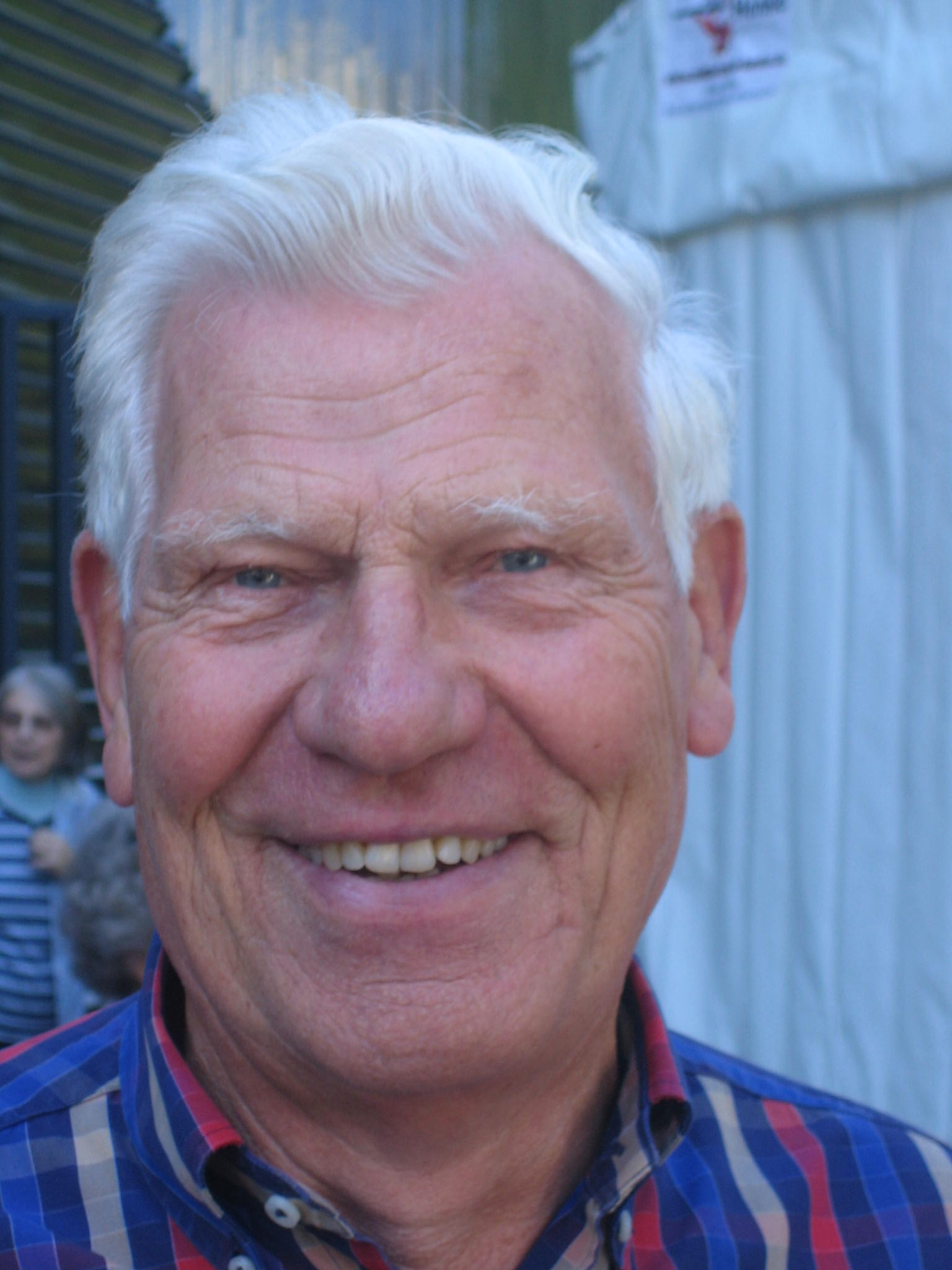
- Weyel in 2010

Mayor of Mainz
- In office 4 May 1987 – 3 May 1997
- Preceded by: Jockel Fuchs
- Succeeded by: Jens Beutel

Personal details
- Born: 20 July 1933 Prenzlau, Brandenburg, Prussia, Germany
- Died: 28 November 2021 (aged 88)
- Party: SPD

Herman-Hartmut Weyel (20 July 1933 – 28 November 2021) was a German politician. A member of the Social Democratic Party of Germany, he served as Mayor of Mainz from 1987 to 1997.

== Politics ==
Weyel, an administrative lawyer, worked in the Rhineland-Palatinate Ministry of Justice from 1962 to 1982. He had been a member of the Mainz city council for the SPD since 1969. He took over the chairmanship of his party's parliamentary group in the city council in 1979, which he held until 1983. From 1 April 1983 to April 1987, he was an alderman of the city of Mainz. Until his death, Weyel was chairman of the association "Vereintes Mainz" (United Mainz), which strives for a reincorporation of the Right-Rhine districts of Mainz.

Weyel was also an assessor in the executive committee of the SPD-Ortsverein Mainz-Oberstadt-Ebertsiedlung.

== Lord Mayor of Mainz ==
Herman-Hartmut Weyel ran together with Eckhart Pick to succeed the Lord Mayor Jockel Fuchs, who had resigned on 30 April 1987. On 16 November 1986, the sub-district party conference of the SPD in the Electoral Palace elected him as candidate for the office of Lord Mayor with 98 out of 195 votes. His rival Pick received 92 votes. As the strongest faction in the city council, the SPD had the right to propose a successor to the mayor. As the CDU also signalled support for the SPD candidate, Weyel was elected as the successor to Jockel Fuchs as Lord Mayor in 1986 with a broad majority in the city council. Weyel took office on 4 May 1987.

Weyel's term in office was marked by the noticeable ebbing of Mainz's rapid boom of the 1960s and 1970s, which is associated with the names of his two popular predecessors Franz Stein and Jockel Fuchs. The number of jobs declined by about 10% during Weyel's tenure, mainly due to the closure of the Waggonfabrik and the Panzerwerk. Unemployment, however, remained mostly below the state and national average.

Mainz's housing market was quite difficult until the mid-1990s due to the lack of new housing developments. After the withdrawal of the US NATO forces due to the end of the East-West Conflict, the former military settlement at Mainz-Finthen Airfield was therefore declared a district of Layenhof. However, since further barracks sites in Mainz-Gonsenheim and at Bruchweg became available for civilian settlement, a massive expansion of Layenhof did not take place.

On the initiative of Weyel and the head of the building department, Heidel and Schüler, the area at the southern entrance to Mainz was redeveloped (Römerschiff-Museum, DB-Cargo-Zentrum, Hyatt Hotel, and the Fort Malakoff Park, an office and business centre built by the Siemens-Nixdorf corporation). The Rhine terrace in front of the Fort Malakoff Centre forms the transition from the green area in front of the Uferstrasse to the Rhine pier and is "accepted" by the people of Mainz, partly because of its proximity to the cultural centre ("Kuz").

The housing estate on the Kästrich, built in 1989 on the site of the former Mainzer Aktien Bierbrauerei, is considered particularly successful for the cityscape.

Always strongly oriented towards consensus between the two largest parties, Weyel advocated the political Mainz Model, a broad coalition between SPD, CDU and FDP. Even when in 1989 there was a calculated majority for red-green in the city council, it took until 1992 for this coalition to come about, in which for the first time a Grünen departmental councillor was elected to the city executive, with votes against from the CDU and FDP, which had now become the Opposition. However, since the SPD and the Greens lost their majority in the city council in 1994, there was again a majority in the city council composed of bourgeois parties and the SPD, with the exclusion of the Greens and the Republikaners.

== Honours ==
- 2005: Cross of Merit 1st Class of the Federal Republic of Germany.

For his commitment to the reconstruction of Mainz's twin city Zagreb after the Yugoslavian wars, the Croatian capital awarded him honorary citizenship.
