= Liebfrauenplatz (Mainz) =

Square in Mainz, Germany

Coordinates: 49.999119°N 8.275254°E

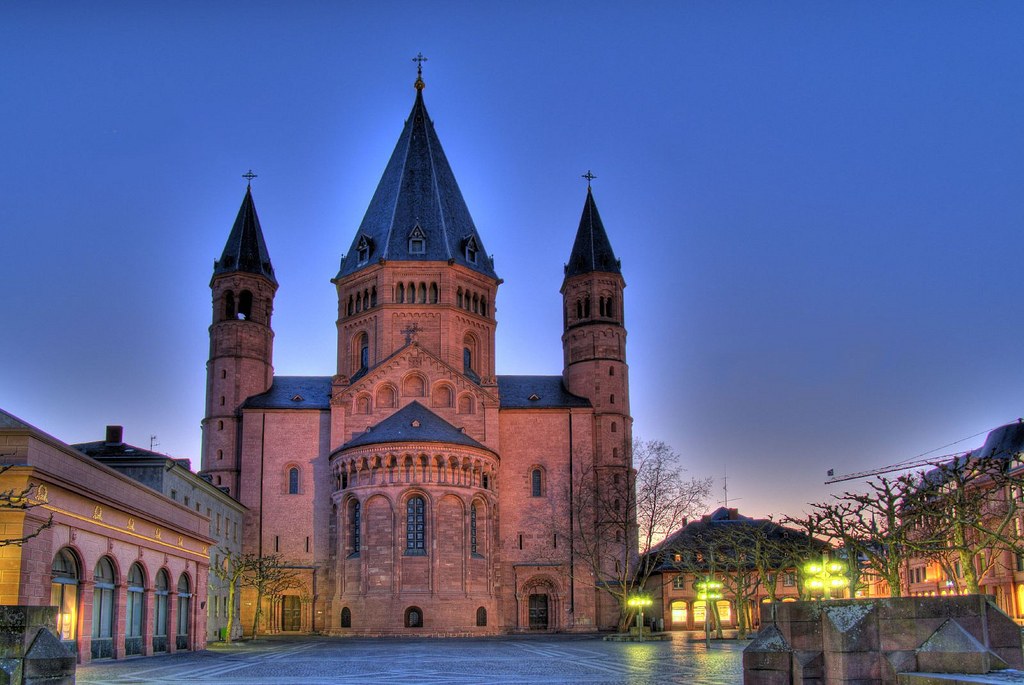
Liebfrauenplatz and east facade of the cathedral

The Liebfrauenplatz in Mainz is the easternmost of the four squares around Mainz Cathedral. It originally housed the Liebfrauenkirche (church of our Lady), which was demolished at the beginning of the 19th century and whose outline can still be seen today on the square, and marks the transition between the cathedral and the Rhine in the direction of the Fischtor, one of the eastward city gates.

== History ==
On the square east of the Liebfrauenkirche was originally the Heumarkt (hay market), later "Marché aux foins". The Liebfrauenkirche, which had previously dominated the square, was built in 1069 by Archbishop Siegfried I. and had to be rebuilt several times after fires between 1285 and 1793. In the course of the Siege of Mainz (1793) the church was bombed by Prussian and Austrian artillery. The new bishop Joseph Ludwig Colmar could not save all religious buildings in Mainz, so her stones were sold. After the demolition of the church in 1807, the present much larger square was built east of the cathedral. The stone material of the old church was used for the construction of the Kastel fortress and for the improvement of the Finthen highway. In 1829 the square was given a clear contour when the Prussian Main Guardroom was built on the southern rim. This guardroom lost its military function in 1902. Today only the façade, restored in 2002, remains of the original building.

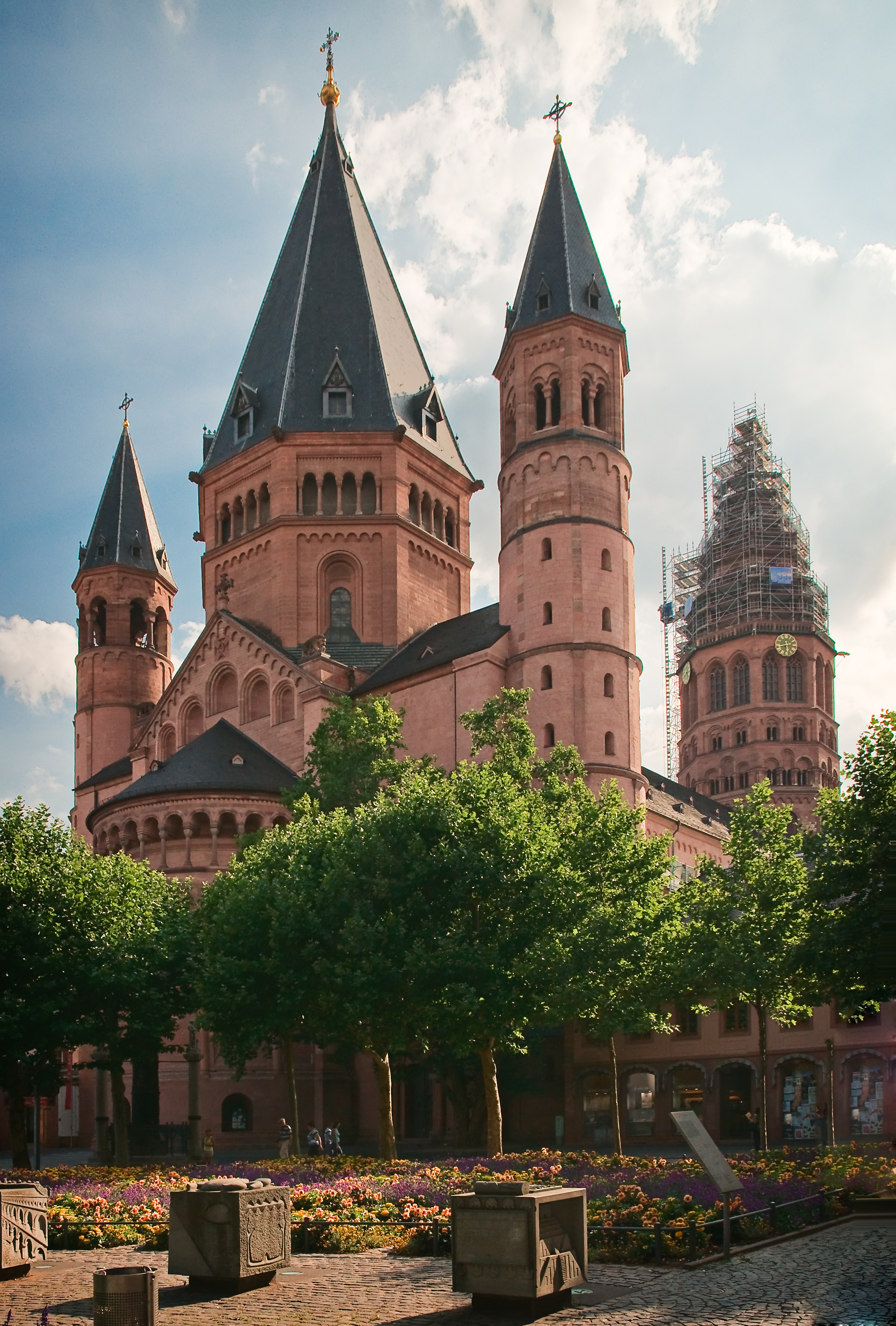
Trees at Liebfrauenplatz (2011)

Karl Göttelmann was Lord Mayor in Mainz, when in 1916 nail column was erected at the Liebfrauenplatz.

After the bombing of Mainz in World War II, some buildings at the rim of the square were missing, which led to a further enlargement. The House Zum Römischen Kaiser, of which only parts remained, was rebuilt with a reconstructed façade; the site where the former House Zum Englischen König stood remained undeveloped and enlarged Liebfrauenplatz. At that time, the architectural historian Karl Gruber recommended the delimitation of the square by the construction of two low buildings. Since such a plan was not feasible due to the already existing garrison Main Guardroom, Gruber developed an alternative concept with the planting of trees. Until 1963, trams in Mainz crossed the square.

On the occasion of the millennial of the construction start of the cathedral in 1975, Liebfrauenplatz was transformed into a pedestrian zone. A part of the square is used as a public green area with changing flower plantings, while the rest is dedicated to the public for walking and (apart from market days) cycling.

At the east of the square, the Gutenberg Museum, founded in 1901 at another location, has been located since the 1920s. Starting from the House Zum Römischen Kaiser, the museum was enlarged in 1962 with a new building designed by architect Rainer Schell. The construction of an extension building on Liebfrauenplatz, the so-called Bibelturm (bibel tower), had been in planning since 2016. On 15 April 2018, in the first referendum in the history of the city, 77% of the voters rejected the realisation of this plan.

== Regular events ==
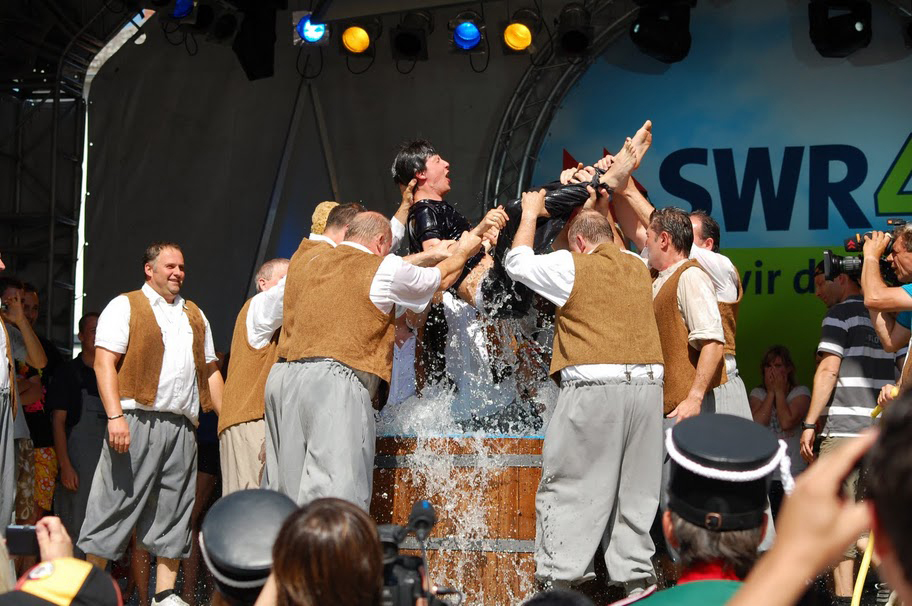
Gautschen during Johannisnacht, 2010

On Tuesdays, Fridays and Saturdays the farmer's market takes place on a part of Liebfrauenplatz. Since the market regulations only permit the sale of goods and not the serving of alcoholic beverages, the so-called "Marktfrühstück" (market breakfast) takes place on a neighbouring area of Liebfrauenplatz opposite the Haus Zum Römischen Kaiser on Saturdays between spring and autumn as a special public use. The members of the Mainz vintners association serve wine from their own production on a weekly basis. The enjoyment of wine is complemented by the consumption of sausages, cheese and bakery products as well as fruit and vegetables purchased at the neighbouring market stalls.

During Advent, the stage programme of the Mainz Christmas Market can be watched on Liebfrauenplatz. At the summit of Mainz carnival, the Rosenmontag procession crosses the square. Other regular events that take place on Liebfrauenplatz include the Intercultural Festival as part of the Intercultural Week and the Johannisnacht. During Johannisnacht, the so-called ″Gautschen″, the traditional printers baptism, takes place on the stage at Liebfrauenplatz.

== Cultural monuments ==
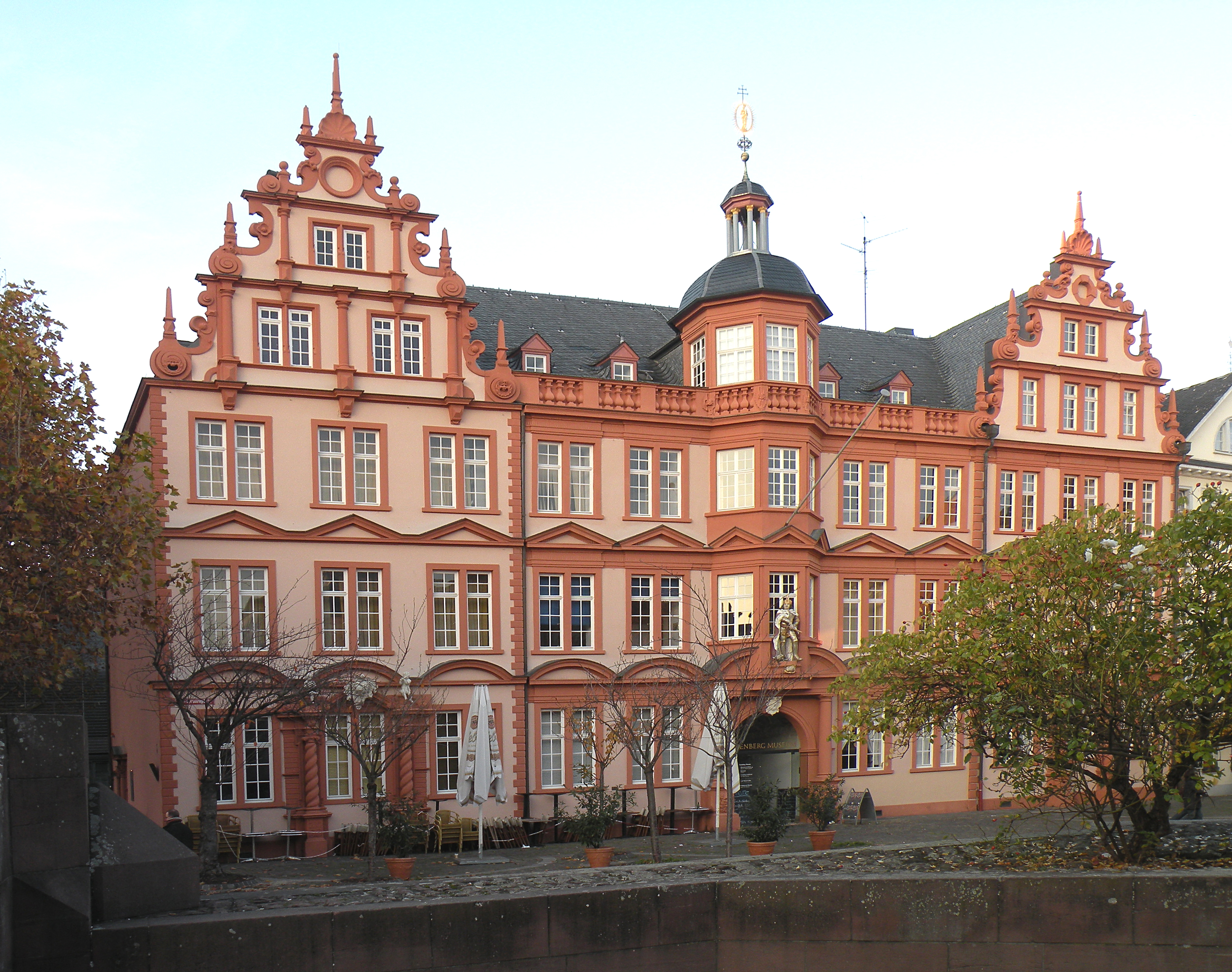
The house ″Zum Römischen Kaiser″, housing the administration of Gutenberg-Museum

Liebfrauenplatz is part of the monument zones Southeastern Old Town and Domstrasse. In addition to the nail column (completed in 1916), the following individual monuments from various eras such as Romanesque, Gothic, Late Renaissance/Early Baroque and Classicism form the peripheral buildings:

- Liebfrauenplatz 4: Mainz cathedral, first execution after 975
- Liebfrauenplatz 5: House ″Zum Römischen Kaiser″, completed after 1657
- Liebfrauenplatz 7: Hostel ″Zum Rothen Haus″, completed in 18th century
- Liebfrauenplatz 8: Prussian Main Guardhouse (today Haus am Dom), completed 1829

== Gallery ==
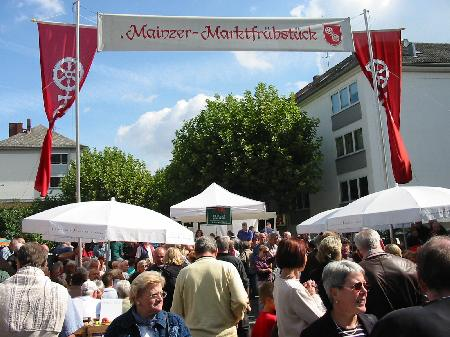
Marktfrühstück

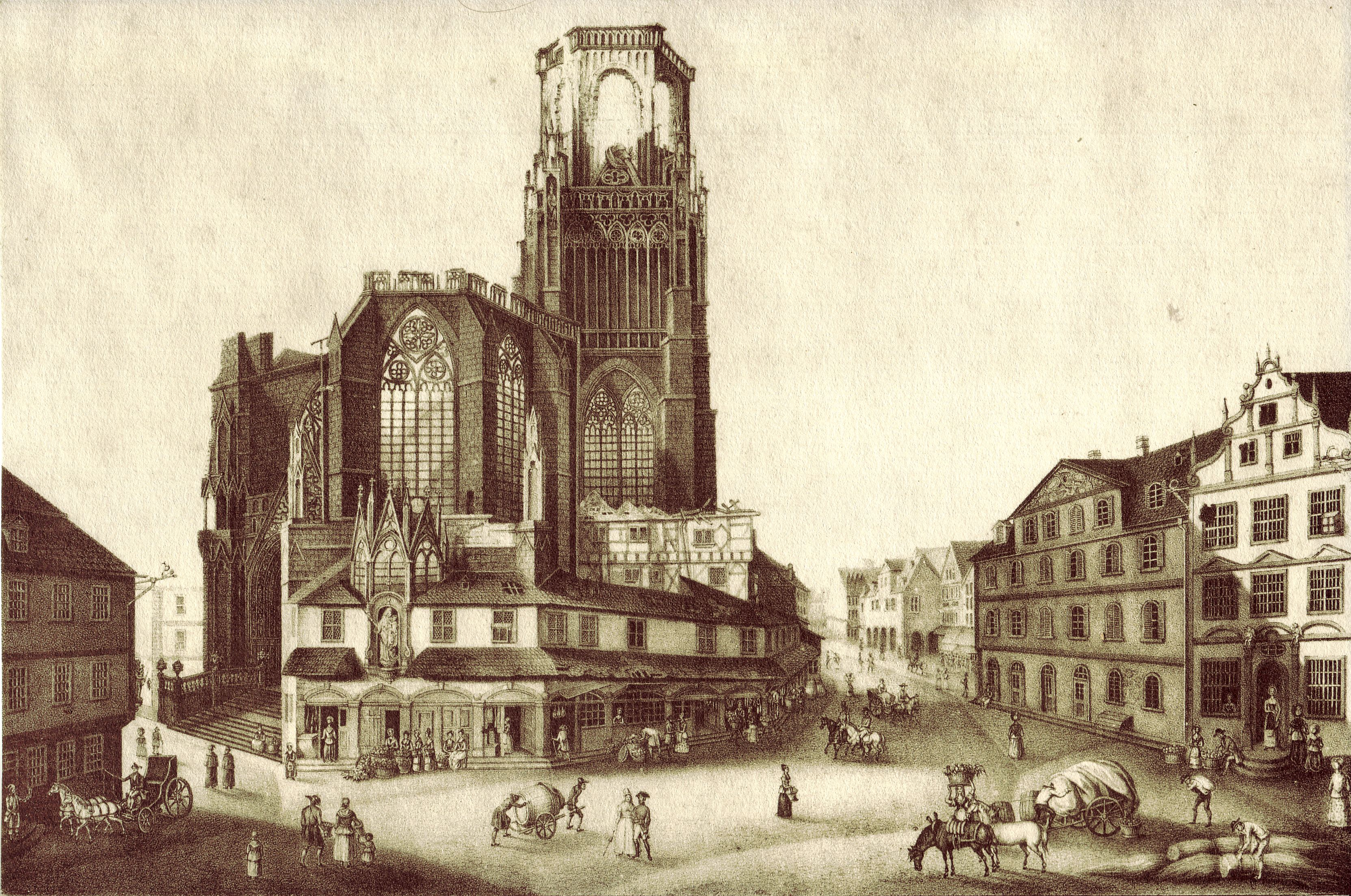
Ruins of Liebfrauenkirche

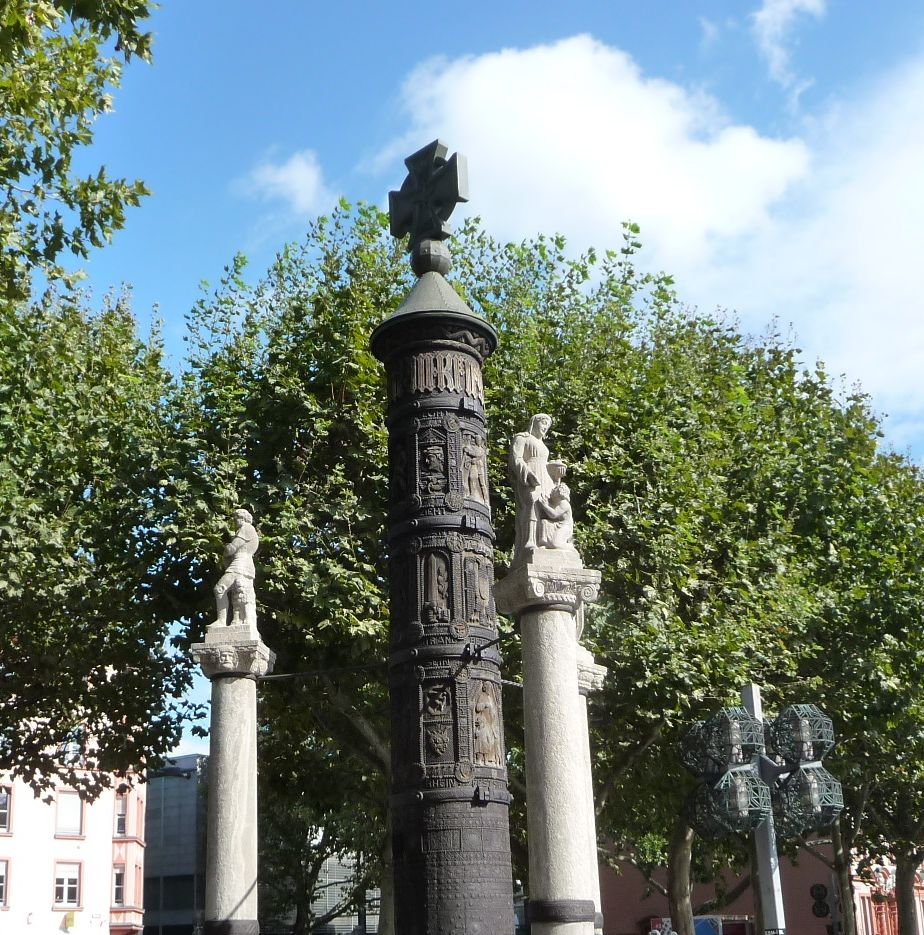
Nail column

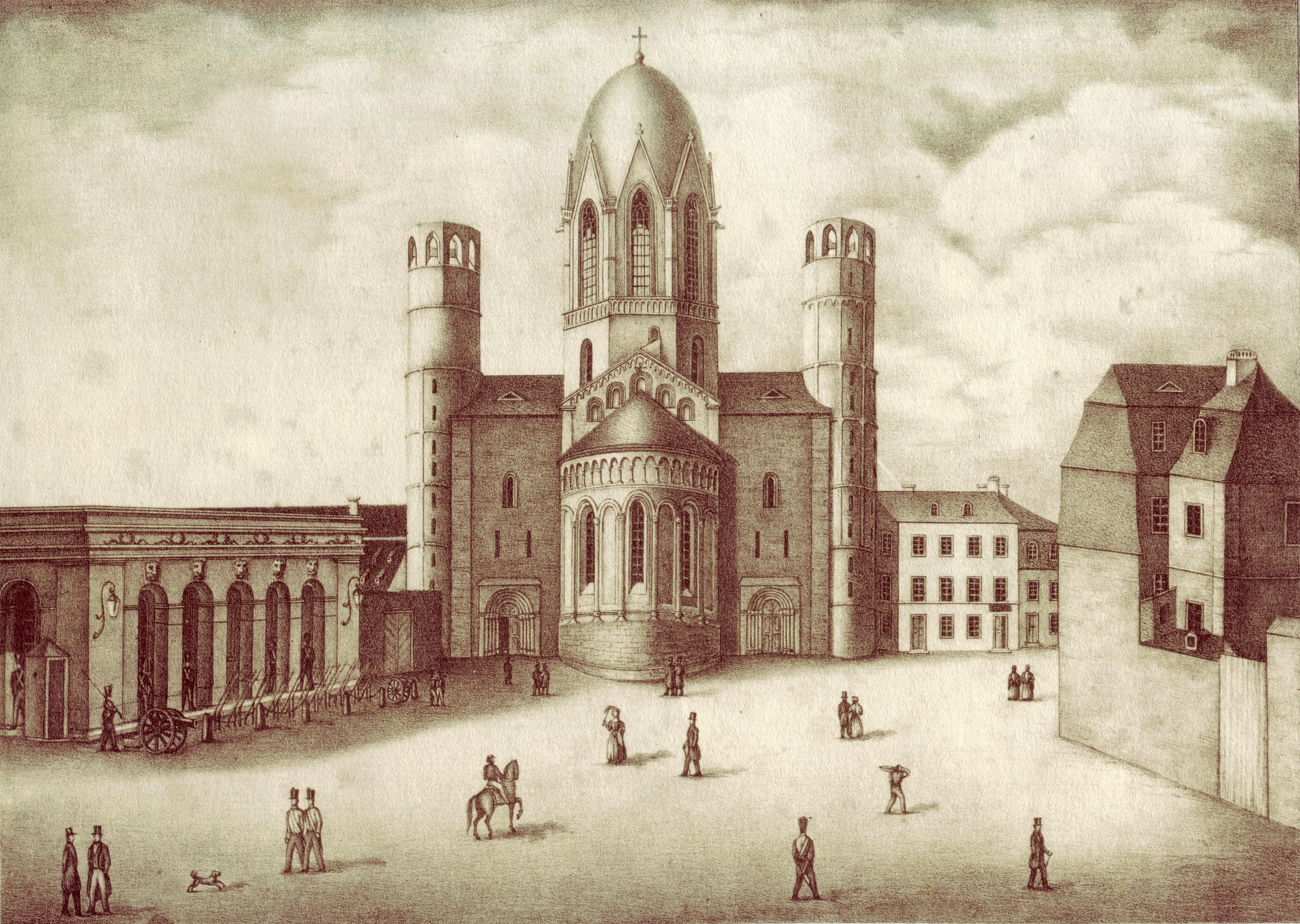
Liebfrauenplatz and cathedral, 1842. Prussian Main Guardhouse to the left

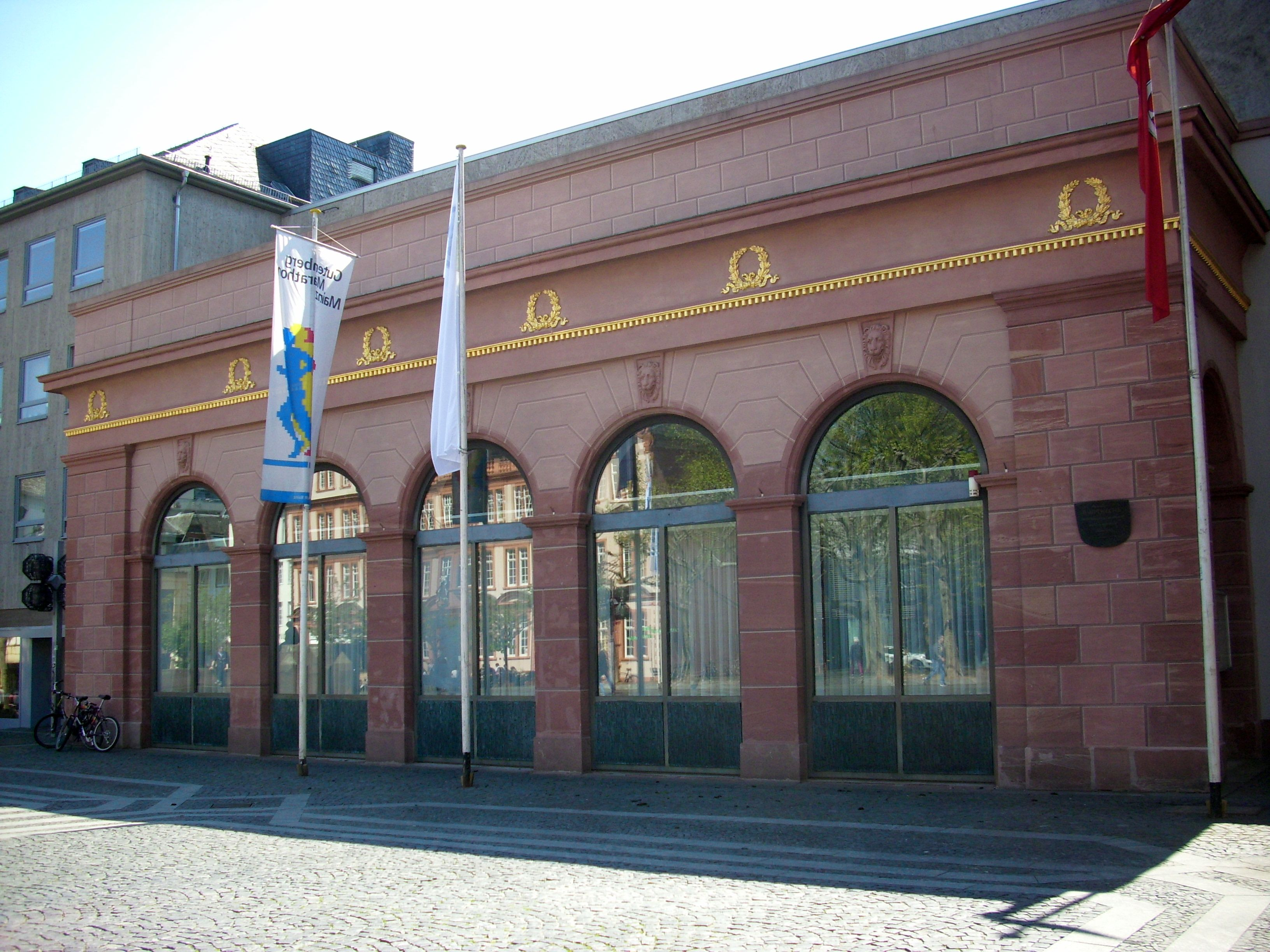
Facade of the Prussian Main Guardhouse, 2016

== Literature ==
- Andrew MacNeille: Zwischen Tradition und Innovation – Historische Plätze in der Bundesrepublik Deutschland nach 1945. Dissertation, Universität Köln, 2004, S. 233–238
