= Carl Wallau =

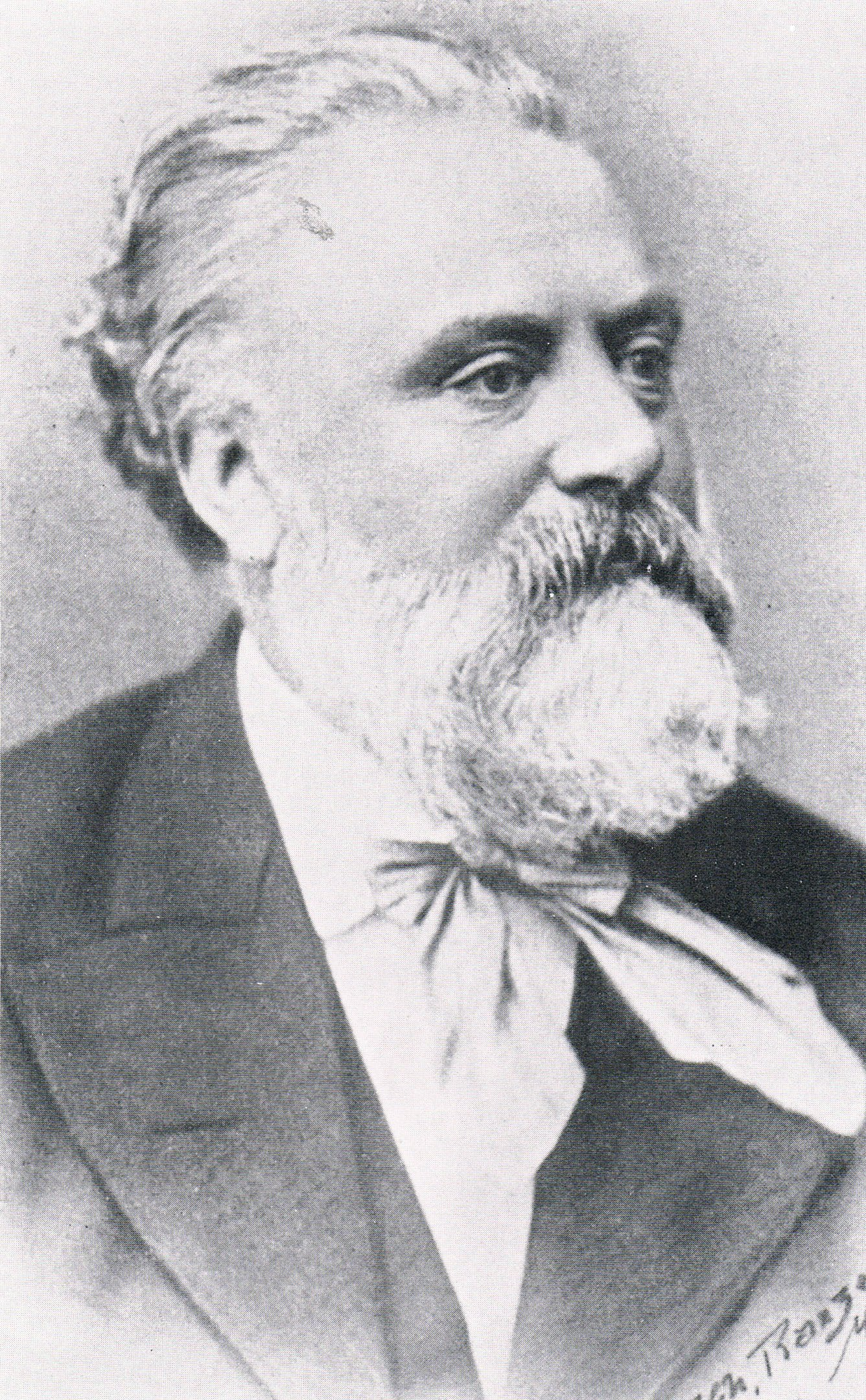
Carl Wallau, contemporary picture

Friedrich Carl Wallau (August 8, 1823 – July 7, 1877 in Mainz). Being a printer, Carl Wallau in 1844 founded his printing plant, the "Graphische Kunstanstalt" in Mainz. On June 7, 1872, Wallau was elected mayor of the city of Mainz. In honor of his achievements for the Mainz city expansion, on March 1, 1877, he was appointed lord mayor of Mainz, a position he held until his death in 1877.

Carl Wallau was member of numberless associations and societies which include the "Mainz Workers' Education Society" that he co-founded in 1848 and which was later to become today's Mainz adult education center. In 1872, he was President of the Mainz Carnival Association (Mainzer Carneval-Verein).

A street in Mainz has been named after Carl Wallau in 1895, the Wallaustraße. It is located in the Mainz "Neustadt", the former "Gartenfeld" which was subject to the Mainz city expansion.
