= Archive for Christian Democratic Policy =

German archive

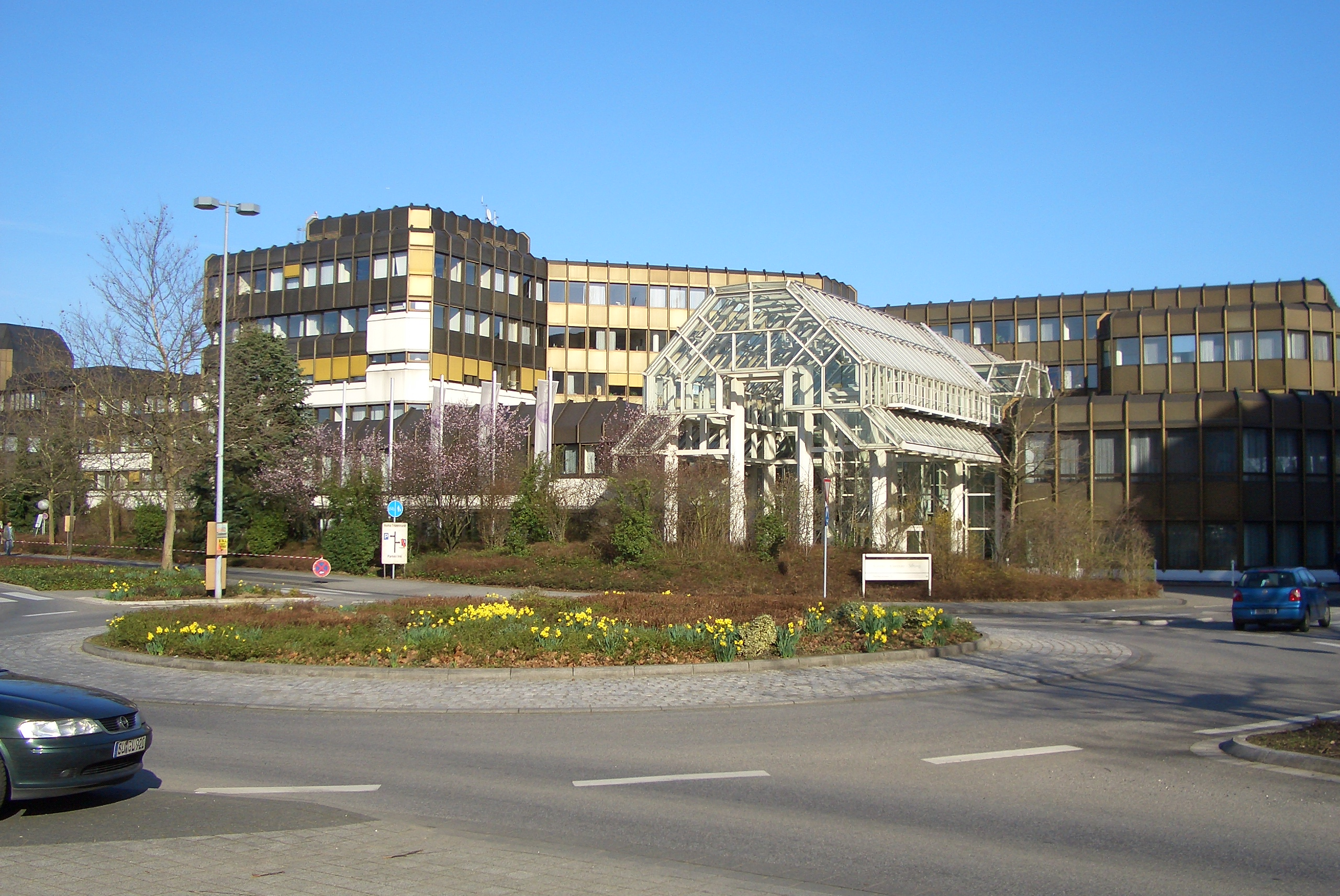
Main entrance of the building of Konrad Adenauer Foundation in Sankt Augustin

The Archive for Christian Democratic Policy (ACDP) at the Konrad Adenauer Foundation, established in 1976 on the initiative of Heinrich Krone, Bruno Heck and Helmut Kohl, is the central archive of the Christian Democratic Union (CDU) of Germany in Sankt Augustin.

By bringing together the sources of history of the CDU and processing the materials thus assembled, the founders’ aim was to enable extensive research to be conducted into the effectiveness of Christian democratic policy in German and European post-war history.

== Size and content of the archive ==
The ACDP is in charge of the records of the CDU, its leading representatives, committees and organisations. It also collects records and other documentation of the Christian precursor parties and of the parties that have merged with the CDU. The records of the international Christian democratic parties, especially the European confederations, are also collected as they arise. Moreover, by taking over the archive and library of the East German CDU in 1990 the ACDP has assumed a significant role in researching the German Democratic Republic’s history.

At present the archive collection runs to 18,000 metres of files, as well as extensive stocks of photographs, posters and audio-visual material. In addition to the historical archive a documentation which collects news and commentaries from the print media and television as well as publications by state institutions, political parties, organisations and the churches is at the user’s disposal. A specialised research and reference library is also available with about 164,000 titles on politics and contemporary history. This intermeshing of the domains of archive, documentation and library makes the ACDP both a source of knowledge and a research institution.

== Operations ==
Its effective functioning is ensured as a result of

- making its records available for historical and political research;
- its own exhibitions, conferences and series of events (e.g. “Colloquy on the Kohl era” since 2000);
- surveys and publications (especially through its series “Forschungen und Quellen zur Zeitgeschichte/Researches and Resources on Contemporary History” and its annually published review “Historisch-Politisch Mitteilungen/Historical-Political Announcements”).

== International significance ==
The archive is frequently consulted and used by foreign researchers, demonstrating that its importance for research on Christian democracy and German history since 1945 is acknowledged throughout the world.

== See also ==
- Christian Democratic Union
- Christian Democracy (Political Ideology)

== Sources ==
- Beaugrand, Günter; Konrad-Adenauer-Stiftung (2003). Die Konrad-Adenauer-Stiftung : eine Chronik in Berichten und Interviews mit Zeitzeugen (in German). Sankt Augustin. ISBN 3-927535-15-X. OCLC 178881415.
- Archiv für Christlich-Demokratische Politik; Buchstab, Günter (1992). Die Bestände des Archivs für Christlich-Demokratische Politik der Konrad-Adenauer-Stiftung : Kurzübersicht (in German). Melle: Knoth. ISBN 3-88368-231-4. OCLC 231390223.
