= Ferdinand Scherf =

Local German historian

Ferdinand Scherf (born in 1943 in Mayen), is a German professor and historian. From 1970 to 2007 he was a teacher at the Rabanus-Maurus-Gymnasium in Mainz and editor of local historical works.

== Life ==
After studying history and German language and literature in Bonn and Mainz, Scherf began his career in February 1970 as a teacher of history and German at the Rabanus-Maurus-Gymnasium, whose deputy headmaster he became in 1986 and where he remained until his retirement in 2007. It is thanks to his commitment that Rabanus-Maurus-Gymnasium has won the "Bundeswettbewerb Geschichte" (Federal History Competition) nine times, which has been held by the President of Germany since 1973.

Scherf is active in the Mainzer Altertumsverein. With his colleague Helmut Link, he published two writings "Begegnungen mit dem Judentum". In 1996, together with Franz Dumont and Friedrich Schütz, the editorial work on an overall presentation of the History of the City of Mainz began. Their publication in 1998 filled a gap in the documentation of the city history.

== Awards ==
In 2007, Scherf was awarded the Order of Merit of the Federal Republic of Germany for his merits as a long-standing tutor of the history competition of the Federal President.

== Writings ==
- with Franz Dumont and Friedrich Schütz: Mainz – Die Geschichte der Stadt. Zabern, Mainz, 1998 ISBN 3-8053-2000-0
- with Franz Dumont: Mainz – Menschen, Bauten, Ereignisse: Eine Stadtgeschichte. Zabern, Mainz 2010 ISBN 978-3-8053-4247-6
- Gymnasium Moguntinum 70, 2007. Blätter des Freundes und Förderkreises des Rabanus-Maurus-Gymnasiums Mainz.
- with M. Hensel-Grobe and F. Dumont (ed.): Rabanus-Maurus-Gymnasium Mainz – Die Geschichte der Schule. Rutzen, Ruhpolding, Mainz 2007.
