= Konrad Adenauer Foundation =

International political foundation

Konrad-Adenauer-Stiftung

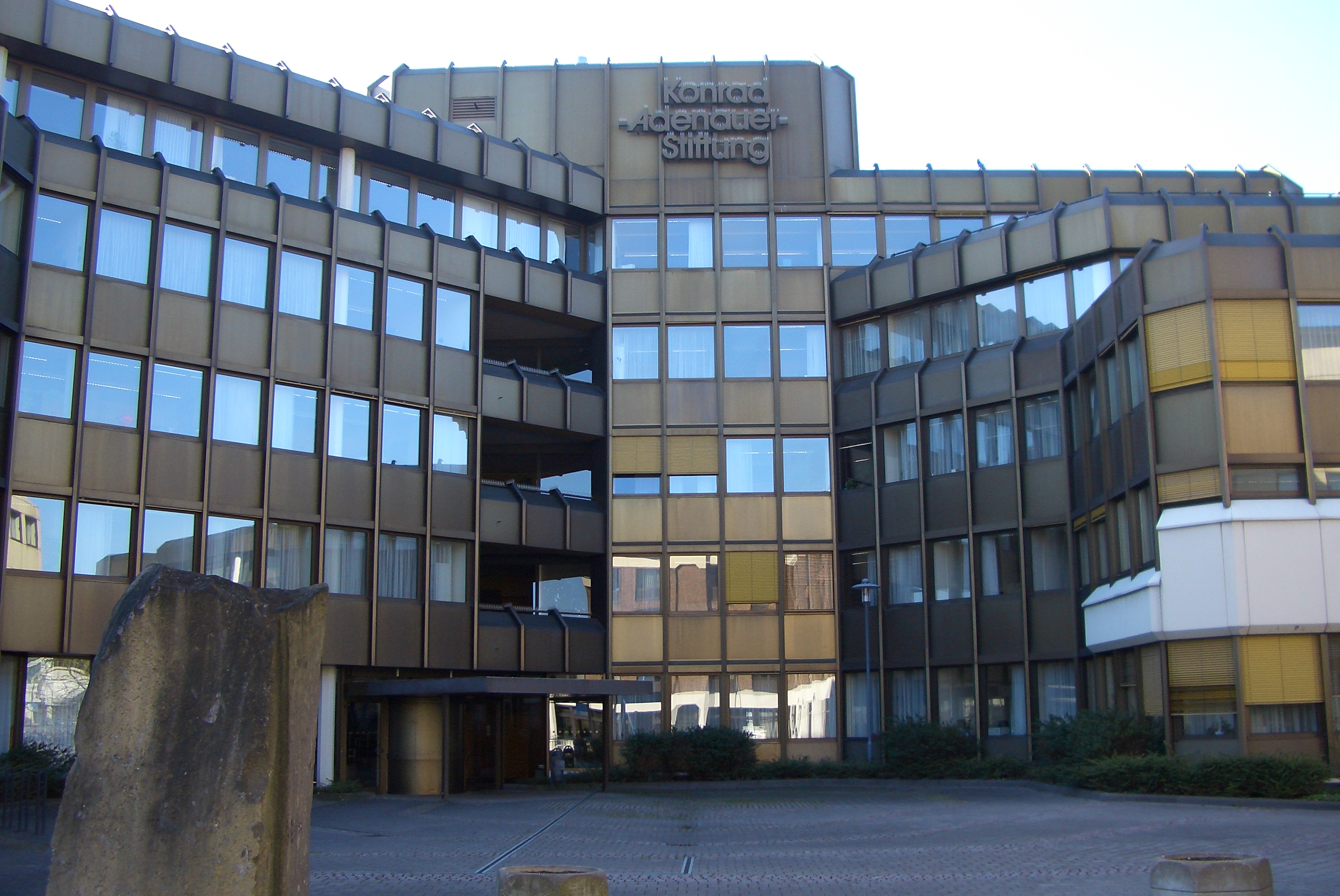
- Eastern side of the Konrad Adenauer Foundation building in Sankt Augustin
- Abbreviation: KAS
- Founded: 20 December 1955 (as the Society for Christian-Democratic Educational Work)
- Founder: Bruno Heck
- Type: e.V.
- Purpose: Education
- Location(s): Berlin and Sankt Augustin
- Region served: Germany
- Affiliations: Christian Democratic Union
- Website: www.kas.de/en/

The Konrad Adenauer Foundation (German: Konrad-Adenauer-Stiftung e.V.; Abbreviation: KAS) is a political foundation based in Germany. It is associated with but independent of the centre-right Christian Democratic Union (CDU). The foundation's headquarters are located in Sankt Augustin near Bonn, as well as in Berlin. Globally, the KAS has 111 foreign offices and runs programs in over 100 countries. Its current chairwoman is Annegret Kramp-Karrenbauer, a former Federal Minister of Defence and Minister-President of Saarland. It is a member of the Martens Centre, the official foundation and think tank of the European People's Party (EPP). In 2020, it ranked 15th amongst think tanks globally.

In August 2024, the Konrad Adenauer Foundation was declared an undesirable organization in Russia.

In November 2024, the Center for Studies in Social Sciences Research (CERSS) in Morocco terminated its partnership with KAS due to a politics-based disagreement.

== Establishment and mission ==
The establishment of a "systematic civic-education program inspired by Christian democratic values" began being considered in 1952 by a group of CDU politicians including Bundestag president Hermann Ehlers, Robert Tillmanns, and Heinrich Krone. On 20 December 1955, the Society for Christian Democratic Education, which would be renamed after Chancellor Konrad Adenauer on 13 October 1964, was opened in Bonn.

The aim of the foundation's civic education programs is, according to their official website, the "promotion of freedom and liberty, peace, and justice" through "furthering European unification, improving transatlantic relations, and deepening development cooperation". Their function as a think-tank and consulting agency is intended to provide citizens with a basis for political action through the research and analyses of current political trends. The KAS offers more than 2,500 conferences and events each year worldwide, and actively supports the political involvement and education of intellectually gifted youth through a prestigious scholarship program as well as an ongoing comprehensive seminar program.

== Institution ==
Along with the headquarters in Sankt Augustin and Berlin, the KAS operates two educational centers, sixteen training centers, an Academy, and an international conference center.

The KAS consists of six departments:

- The aforementioned Academy located in Berlin, which hosts symposia, conferences, meetings, and exhibitions in order to analyze relevant societal and political issues in a public setting.
- The Archive for Christian Democratic Policy (ACDP) documents and researches Christian Democracy's historical development.
- The department for European and International Cooperation engages itself with international politics through the functions of the foundation's more than 200 projects in around 120 countries.
- The Politics and Consulting department is the think tank of the KAS.
- The department for Civic Education combats the status quo, looking to invoke citizen participation in an era where freedom and peace are taken for granted.
- The Scholarships and Cultural Activities department provides financial and moral support to roughly 2,000 students.

Former president of the Bundestag Norbert Lammert is the current president of the KAS. He is joined on the board of directors by 24 other individuals. The KAS currently has 55 members, many of whom are current and former CDU politicians. The board of trustees has 24 members who assist and supervise the work of the KAS.

== Finances ==
Similar to other German political foundations, the Konrad Adenauer Foundation is largely financed by federal and land government funds.

In 1994 the foundation spent on its programs about 90 million marks.

96.8% of the foundation's €120 million budget in 2009 was therefore provided by public funding, while 2.7% was derived from admission charges and miscellaneous revenues, and 0.5% came from private funds and donations.

== See also ==
The other parties in Germany also use the legal form of a foundation for support and public relations purposes. The other foundations are:

- Desiderius Erasmus Foundation (AfD)
- Friedrich Ebert Foundation (SPD)
- Friedrich Naumann Foundation for Freedom (FDP)
- Hanns Seidel Foundation (CSU)
- Heinrich Böll Foundation (Die Grünen)
- Rosa Luxemburg Foundation (Die Linke).
