= Römisches Kaisermedaillon =

Award by the German city of Mainz

The Römische Kaisermedaillon is an award presented by the city of Mainz.

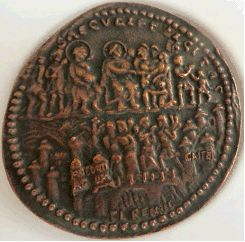
The Römische Kaisermedaillon of the city of Mainz

As part of the award, a replica of the Lyons lead medallion, probably made in 297 AD, is being presented, with the oldest known pictorial representation of the lead medallion found in Ancient Rome Mogontiacum. The award is presented at irregular intervals to persons who have rendered outstanding services to the study of the cultural history of the city of Mainz.

== Holders of the Römischen Kaisermedaillons ==
- 1970: Marie Böckel-Grosch
- 1976: Paul Walter Jacob
- 1980: Heinz Gehrmann
- 1982: Jürgen Jughard
- 1987: Werner Hanfgarn
- 1994: Fritz Diehl
- 2000: Helmut Mathy
- 2006: Friedrich Schütz
- 2007: Fee Fleck
- 2008: Franz Dumont
- 2011: Hans-Jürgen Kotzur
- 2015: Hedwig Brüchert
