= Allgemeine Zeitung (Mainz) =

German newspaper

- Type: Daily newspaper
- Format: Broadsheet
- Owner(s): Verlagsgruppe Rhein Main
- Publisher: Verlagsgruppe Rhein Main
- Editor-in-chief: Friedrich Roeingh
- Founded: 1850
- Language: German
- Headquarters: Mainz
- Circulation: 52,500
- Website: www.allgemeine-zeitung.de

Allgemeine Zeitung is a German regional daily newspaper, published in Mainz, the capital of Rhineland-Palatinate. Founded in 1850, it is now part of the Rhein Main Presse, published by Verlagsgruppe Rhein Main.

== History ==
The paper was founded in 1850 as the Täglicher Straßenanzeiger (daily street advertisement). From 1854 a redaction developed political, business, cultural and local news. The name was changed to Mainzer Anzeiger. After World War I, the paper developed to a regionally read daily. The publication house was destroyed in the air raid on 27 February 1945. In the fall of 1945, a paper was founded named Neuer Mainzer Anzeiger, changed once more in May 1947 to Allgemeine Zeitung.
