= List of mayors of Mainz =

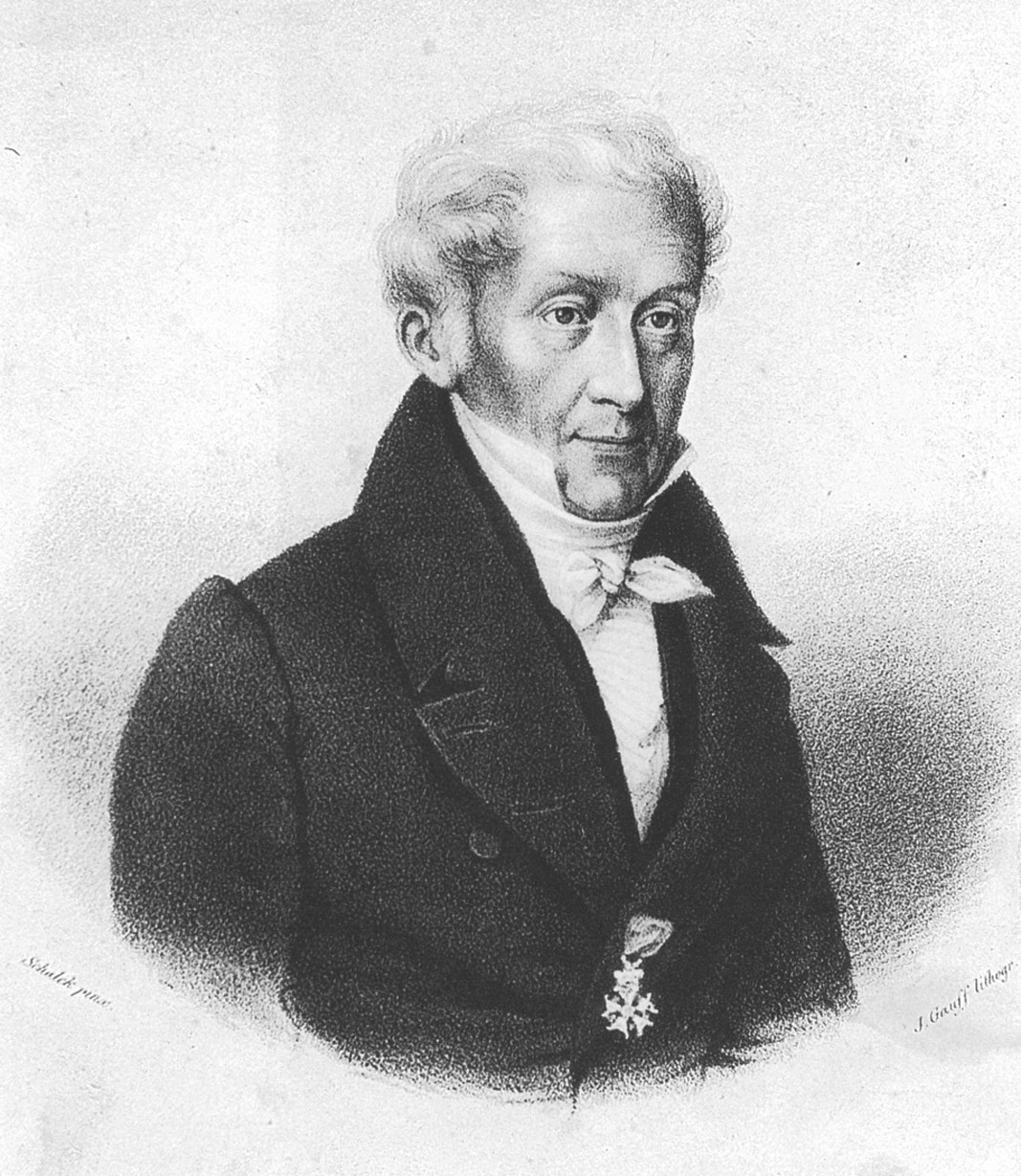
Franz Konrad Macké (1756–1844, Maire and Mayor of Mainz (Lithographie by Gauff)

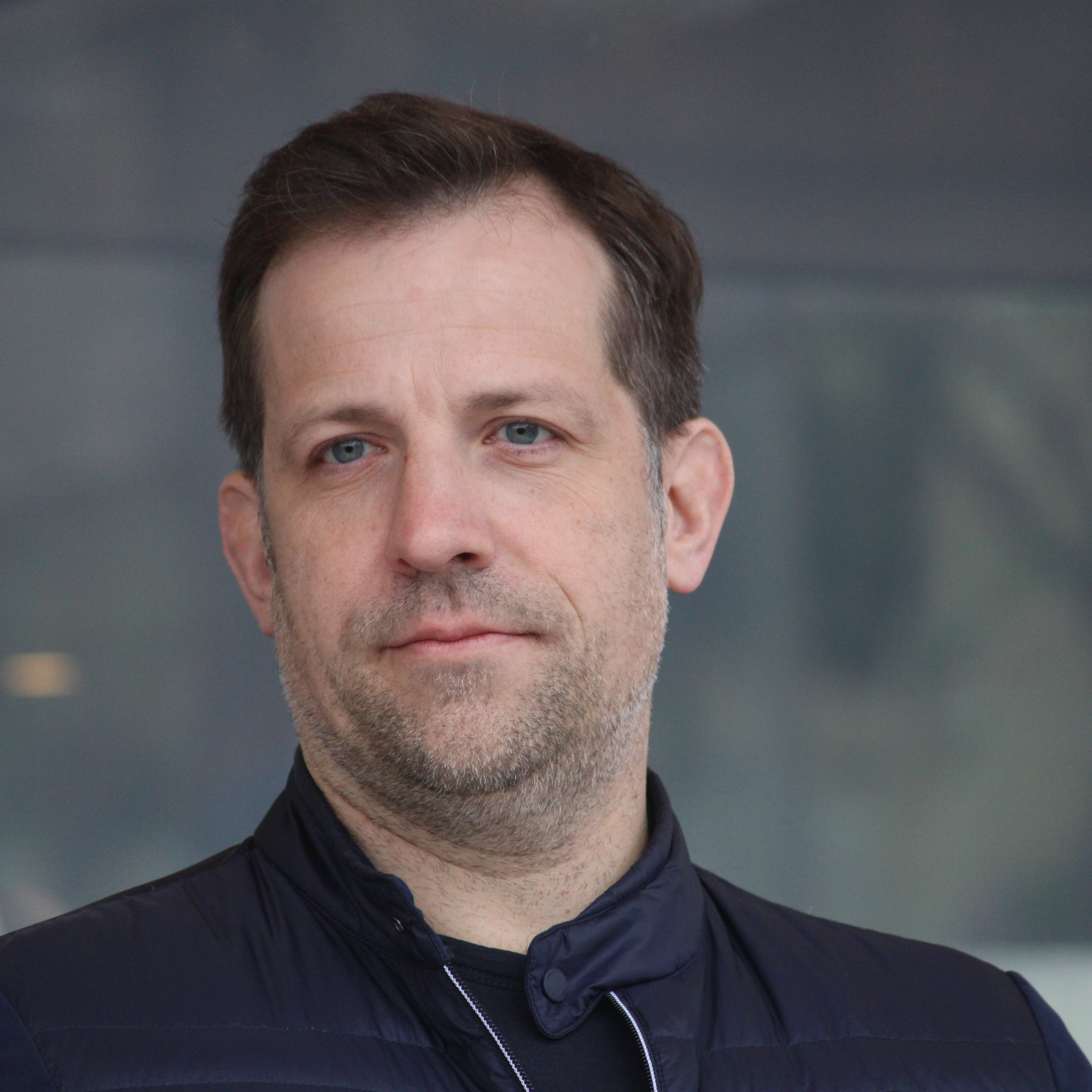
Nino Haase, current mayor

This is a list of mayors of Mainz, including the Lord Mayors (Oberbürgermeister von Mainz) since 1796.

- 1796–1800: Fredrick Pongrass
- 1800–1814: Franz Macké
- 1814–1831: Franz Freiherr Gedult von Jungenfeld
- 1831–1834: Franz Macké
- 1834–1836: Stephan Metz
- 1837–1838: Johann Baptist Heinrich
- 1839–1841: Stephan Metz
- 1842–1860: Nikolaus Nack
- 1861–1864: Karl Schmitz
- 1865–1871: Franz Schott
- 1871–1872: Karl Racké
- 1872–1877: Carl Wallau
- 1877–1885: Alexis Dumont
- 1885–1894: Georg Oechsner
- 1894–1905: Heinrich Gassner
- 1905–1919: Karl Göttelmann
- 1919–1931: Karl Külb
- 1931–1933: Wilhelm Ehrhard
- 1934–1942: Robert Barth
- 1942–1945: Heinrich Ritter
- 1945: Rudolph Walther
- 1945–1949: Emil Kraus
- 1949–1965: Franz Stein
- 1965–1987: Jakob "Jockel" Fuchs
- 1987–1997: Herman-Hartmut Weyel
- 1997–2011:Jens Beutel the first who was elected to the position directly by the citizens.
- 2012–2022: Michael Ebling
- 2023–present: Nino Haase

== See also ==
- Timeline of Mainz
