= Iron Tower =

Coordinates: 50°0′4″N 8°16′32″E

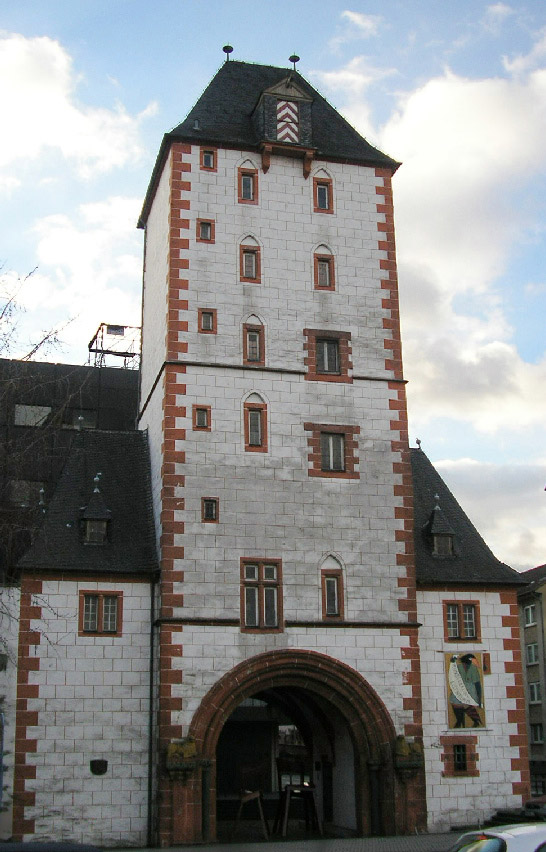
The Iron Tower

The Iron Tower (German: Eisenturm) is a mediaeval tower dating to the early 13th century, and modified in the 15th century, which with the Wood Tower and the Alexander Tower is one of three remaining towers from the city walls of Mainz, Germany. Its name derives from the Iron Market (Eisenmarkt), which was held in the immediate vicinity until the 19th century.

The Iron Tower served as a watchtower and gate to the city, and later as a gaol. It was badly damaged in World War II and reconstructed in the 1960s. Today it houses various organizations and art projects and is used for art exhibitions.

== Historical background: the defenses of Mainz ==
Since late Roman times, the city of Mainz (then Mogontiacum) was defended by a wall with watchtowers and city gates. The first wall was built shortly before the destruction of the limes in 259/260 CE. Not long after 350, in the course of the abandonment of the Roman camp, this wall was lowered and rubble (spolia) from earlier construction used to enlarge and strengthen it. After the Romans withdrew, it was improved at various times, particularly in the Merovingian and Carolingian periods, becoming what archaeologists studying the city have called the "Roman-Carolingian" wall.

However, in 1160 the continuity of the city's defenses was drastically interrupted. There was a longstanding dispute between the citizens of Mainz and their archbishop, Arnold of Selenhofen (and also with the Holy Roman Emperor Frederick Barbarossa); after the archbishop was murdered, the emperor imposed an imperial ban on the city. The city walls and towers were razed (although it is possible that on the inland side the destruction was only partial).

However, Mainz was an important political and strategic ally in the Hohenstaufens' struggle for supremacy in the German Empire against the Welfs, and so in circa 1190–1200 the city was granted permission to rebuild the defences. The Iron Tower was built in this phase of construction, as one of a total of 34 gate towers and watchtowers.

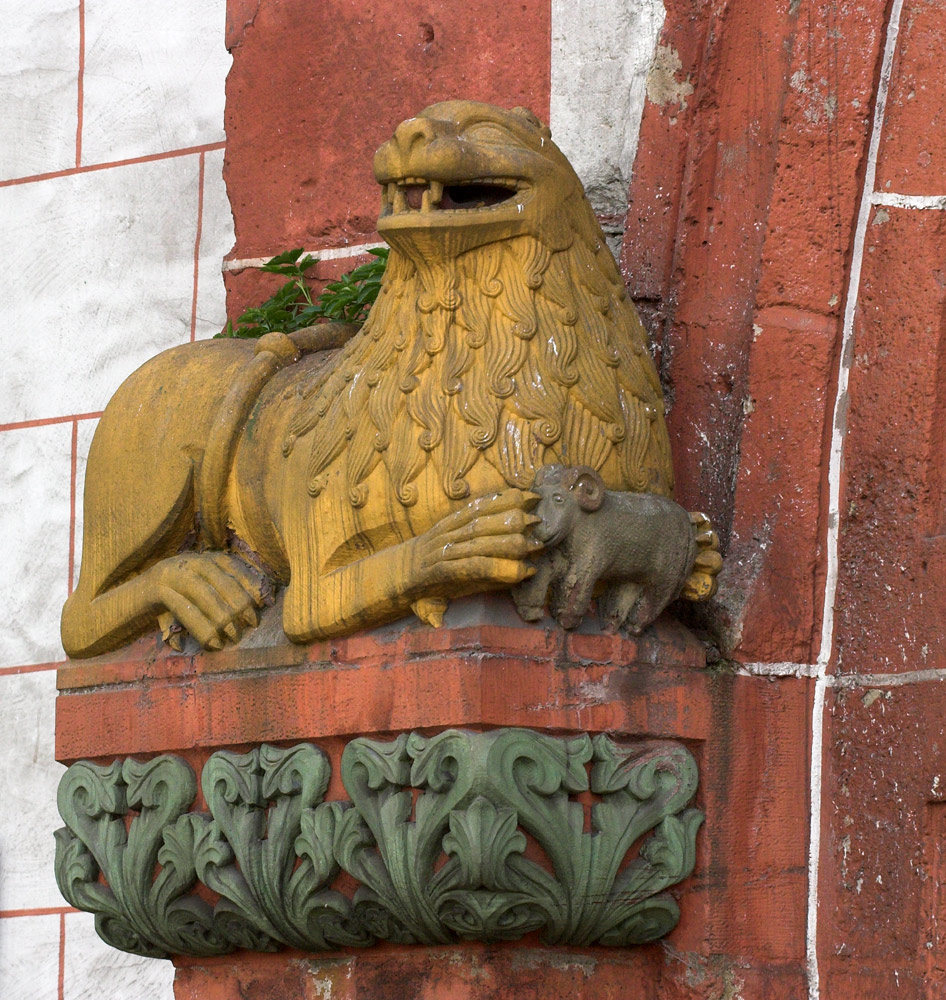
Late Romanesque carving of a lion on the Iron Gate (c. 1240)

== Style and construction phases ==
The round-arched late Romanesque gateway at the base of the tower dates to the first half of the 13th century, probably around 1240. On the Rhine side, the arch is embellished with two Romanesque carvings of lions in sandstone, atop ornamental capitals over fluted cornerstones. One lion grasps a ram in its paws, sometimes interpreted as a symbol of the power of the Church, while the second grasp a dragon or other fabulous animal, symbolizing secular power. The lions, an embodiment of defensive vigilance in Romanesque art, are executed in a characteristically stylised manner.

In the first half of the 15th century, the tower was raised to 6 stories. Towards the end of the 16th century (or possibly as early as the start of the 14th), the gateway lost its function and the entrance to the city was moved to the so-called "Little Iron Door" (Eisentürlein) in a smaller building attached to the tower.

In the 18th century, the Iron Tower was enclosed on the Rhine side by a wall. This remained until the early years of the 20th century. On the other, Löhrstraße, side, there were small Fachwerk houses until 1945.

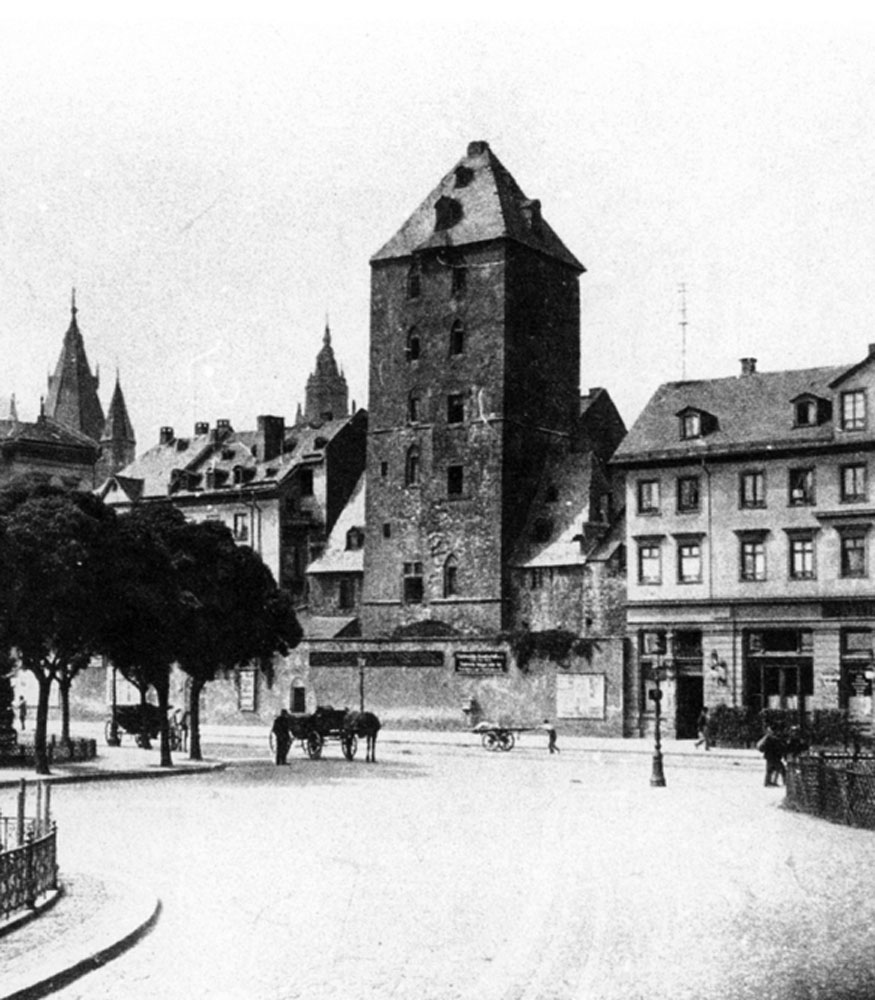
The Iron Tower around 1900, enclosed by a wall

== Mediaeval and modern uses ==
Until the 16th century, the Iron Tower was one of the towers and gateways in the city walls. In the Middle Ages, shipping on the Rhine was of major importance, so the riverside was heavily used and was the trading center of the city. Thus the Iron Tower and the other Rhine-side towers of the city (the Wood Tower, Fish Tower, etc.) formed a secular counterbalance to the many church towers on the city skyline. In the Middle Ages, the Mainz iron traders held their market around the tower, giving it the name by which it is still known.

Beginning in the 17th century, the upper stories of the Iron Tower were used as the main goal of what was then the French city of Mayence. Prominent prisoners held there included some officers of the Lützow Free Corps in 1813, and the Mainz revolutionaries from the March Revolution of 1848/49 until they were pardoned in 1850.

In 1900, the Iron Tower was to be torn down but was saved by the Mainz Association of Antiquities (Mainzer Altertumsverein) and in 1905 became the property of the city. After this, it housed a painter's studio and small flats. The courtyard behind the wall on the Rhine side was used for temporary storage of old stone monuments.

== Destruction and rebuilding ==
In World War II, the entire center of the city, including the Iron Tower, was severely damaged. After an air raid in February 1945, the roof and interior of the tower were completely destroyed by fire, as were the houses built around the tower. In 1958 it was rebuilt and given a new slate-covered hipped roof. The wall around it was removed in the early 1970s in the course of renovation of the neighboring Zum Brand housing development. On both sides of the tower, the adjacent buildings and a portion of the city wall were reconstructed to reproduce the medieval structures as accurately as possible. The ashlar corners and painted joints were also restored based on remnants of the original.

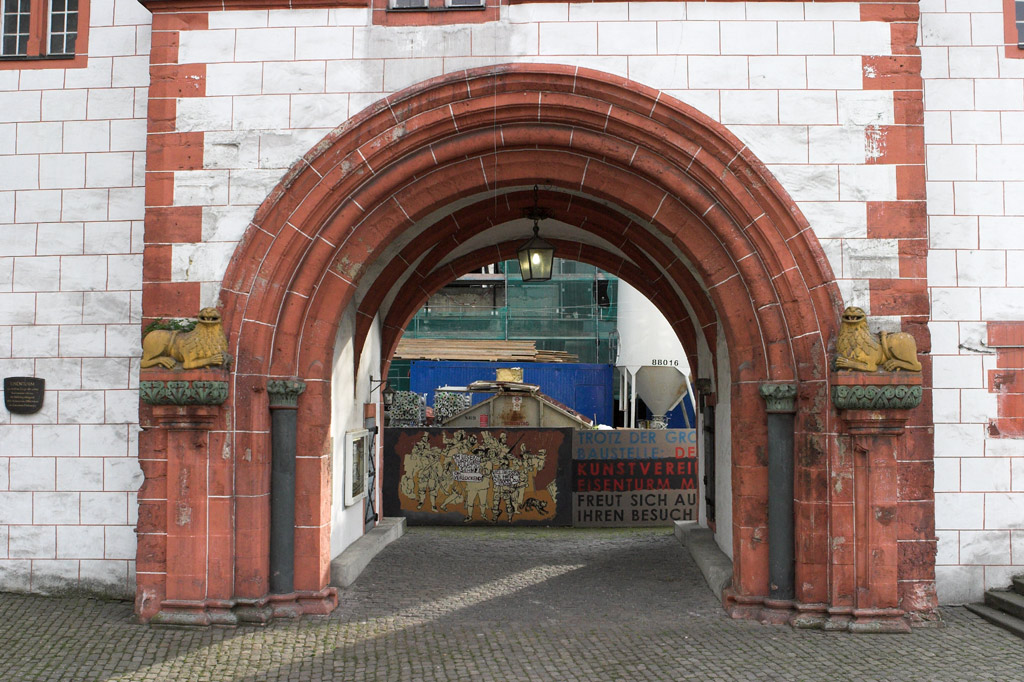
The tower gateway in 2006

== Today ==
The Iron Tower currently houses the Kunstverein Eisenturm Mainz (Mainz Iron Tower Art Association), which has a nationwide reputation in Germany. The artists use the tower as a gallery and exhibition space and award a prize named for it. Other public services and organizations, for example, the Mainz photography club and Mainz Rotaract, are also based in the tower.

The tower may be visited as part of the national European Heritage Days, Tag des offenen Denkmals.

== Sources ==
- Ernst Stephan. Das Bürgerhaus in Mainz. Das deutsche Bürgerhaus XVIII. Tübingen: Wasmuth, 1974, repr. 1982. ISBN 3-8030-0020-3
- Rolf Dörrlamm, Susanne Feick, Hartmut Fischer and Hans Kersting. Mainzer Zeitzeugen aus Stein. Baustile erzählen 1000 Jahre Geschichte. Mainz: Hermann Schmidt, 2001. ISBN 3-87439-525-1
- Günther Gillessen, ed. Wenn Steine reden könnten - Mainzer Gebäude und ihre Geschichten. Mainz: von Zabern, 1991. ISBN 3-8053-1206-7
