= Mainz (journal) =

- Discipline: History, culture, economy, politics
- Language: German
- Edited by: Michael Bonewitz

Publication details
- History: Since 1981
- Publisher: City of Mainz, Bonewitz Communication (Germany)
- Frequency: quarterly

Standard abbreviations
- ISO 4: Mainz

Indexing
- ISSN: 0720-5945

Links
- Journal homepage

Mainz (German: Mainz – Vierteljahreshefte für Kultur, Politik, Wirtschaft, Geschichte) is a German quarterly journal that publishes on cultural, political, economic, and historical aspects of the German city of Mainz. The journal was founded in 1981 by the later mayor of Mainz, Jockel Fuchs. It is currently edited by Michael Bonewitz. The journal has sections on culture, city history, politics, sports, and other topics, and contains full-color illustrations.
