= Jost Benedum =

German medicine historian

Jost Benedum (16 January 1937 – 23 December 2003) was a German historian of medicine.

== Life ==
Benedum was born in Merzig. After the Abitur at the grammar school of St. Ingbert, Benedum studied Classical Philology at the University of Saarland from 1957. He spent a few semesters at the Justus Liebig University of Giessen, the Sorbonne in Paris, the University of London and the University of Athens. In 1962, he graduated from the Philosophicum in Saarbrücken, and in 1964 from the First Staatsexamen in the University of Giessen. In 1966, he was awarded a doctorate PhD in philosophy with a dissertation on the elegiac late work of the Roman poet Ovid.

After his doctorate, Benedum worked as a research assistant at the Institute for the History of Medicine at the University of Gießen, which was headed by Markwart Michler. At this time, he started to study medicine, which he completed in 1970 with the Physikum. One year after his habilitation (1972), he was appointed provisional director of the Institute for the History of Medicine in 1973. He supervised thesis students for 25 years until his retirement.

In 1978, he was appointed to the Giessen Chair of the History of Medicine, which he held until his retirement. He declined appointments to the universities Ruprecht-Karls-Universität Heidelberg and Heinrich-Heine-Universität Düsseldorf. After his retirement in the winter semester 2001/2002, he provisionally headed the Institute until the summer of 2004. His successor at the Institute for the history of medicine is Volker Roelcke.

Benedum dealt with the history of medicine from antiquity to modern times. He often visited Greece, which became his second home. On the island Kos, for example, he carried out several excavations to verify the connection of the place with the physician Hippocrates.

In 1981, Benedum became a corresponding member of the Akademie der Wissenschaften und der Literatur in Mainz, and a full member in 1993. At the academy, he was particularly involved with the Samuel Thomas von Soemmerring edition, whose project management he took over. From 1994, he was a member of the Academy of Non-Profit Sciences in Erfurt (Akademie gemeinnütziger Wissenschaften zu Erfurt).

His main areas of research included the medical history of epigraphy and numismatics, the history of surgery and wound care, physical medicine and balneotherapy, obstetrics, paediatrics, of blood transfusion, rheumatology, phytotherapy and health education, the history of the Medical Faculty of Giessen, Art and Medicine as well as Sömmerring research and the collection of Sömmerring's works.

Benedum died in Gießen at the age of 65.

== Publications ==
The Early History of the Artificial Kidney

Samuel Thomas Soemmerring: Werke, ed. by Gunter Mann, Jost Benedum and Werner F. Kümmel, 20 vols. (1990-)
