= Wood Tower =

Coordinates: 49°59′50″N 8°16′41″E

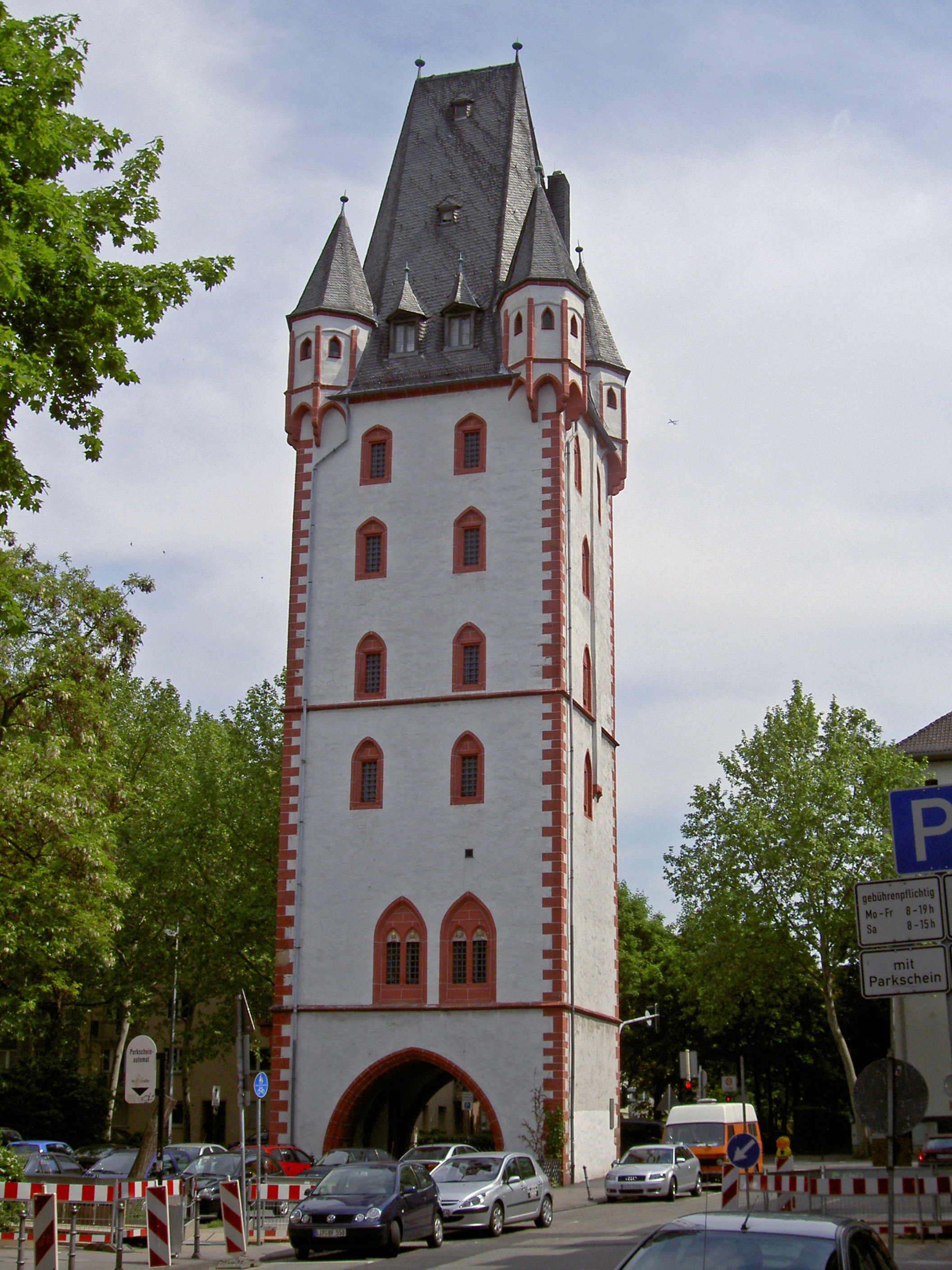
The Wood Tower

The Wood Tower (German: Holzturm) is a mediaeval tower in Mainz, Germany, with the Iron Tower and the Alexander Tower one of three remaining towers from the city walls. Its current Gothic appearance dates to the early 15th century. It is so named because wood used to be piled next to it on the bank of the Rhine.

Like the Iron Tower, the Wood Tower was used as a watchtower and gate-tower and later as a gaol. It was badly damaged in World War II and accurately reconstructed in 1961 for the two-thousandth anniversary of the city. It currently houses various organisations and clubs.

== Historical background: the defences of Mainz ==
Beginning in late Roman times, the city of Mainz (then Mogontiacum) was defended by a wall with watchtowers and city gates. The first wall was built shortly before the destruction of the limes in 259/260 CE. Not long after 350, in the course of the abandonment of the Roman camp, this wall was lowered and rubble (spolia) from earlier construction used to enlarge and strengthen it. After the Romans withdrew, it was improved at various times, particularly in the Merovingian and Carolingian periods, becoming what archaeologists studying the city have called the "Roman-Carolingian" wall.

However, in 1160 the continuity of the city's defences was drastically interrupted. There was a longstanding dispute between the citizens of Mainz and their archbishop, Arnold of Selenhofen (and also with the Holy Roman Emperor Frederick Barbarossa); after the archbishop was murdered, the emperor imposed an imperial ban on the city. The city walls and towers were razed (although it is possible that on the inland side the destruction was only partial).

However, Mainz was an important political and strategic ally in the Hohenstaufens' struggle for supremacy in the German Empire against the Welfs, and so in c. 1190–1200 the city was granted permission to rebuild the defences. The predecessor of the Wood Tower, the so-called Neuturm (New Tower) was built in the second half of the 13th century when the previously independent settlement of Selenhofen was incorporated into the defences of the city. It replaced the Romanesque Wingert Gate; the first recorded mention of it is in 1366.

== Architectural style ==
The Wood Gate as it stands today is a Gothic structure dating to the first half of the 15th century. Like the Iron Tower, the six-storey tower has walls of crushed stone articulated by square quoins and two dividing cornices, and is surmounted by a hipped roof, in this case very steep. In contrast to the Iron Tower, however, the Wood Tower is much more slenderly proportioned, which is typical of the 'verticality' of the Gothic style.

The former city gate has a pointed archway, and a ribbed vault for the ceiling. (As a result of the embankment of the Rhine in modern times, the passageway through the gate is now approximately 3 metres (9 ft 10 in) below street level.) Polygonal turrets with tall pointed roofs sprout from all four corners of the base of the roof, supported by stepped corbels connected by lancet arches. The tall windows have typically Gothic pointed-arch frames. Busts of couples appear above two windows on the first floor on the city side of the tower: a burgher and his wife and a king and queen.

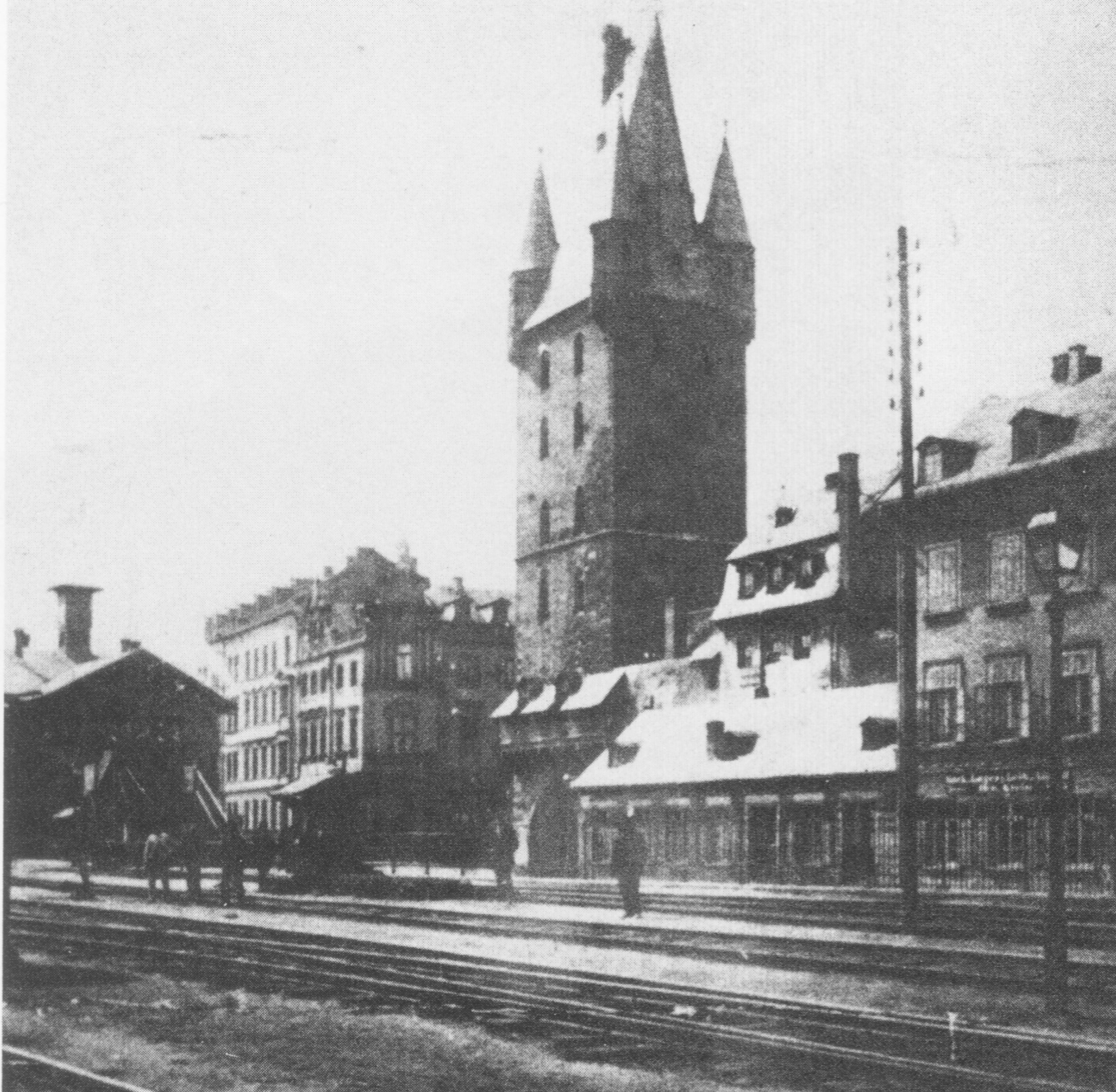
Pre-1880 view of the Wood Tower; in the foreground the former main station, demolished in 1884

== Mediaeval and modern uses ==
The tower formed part of the fortifications of the city and also as a gate in the rebuilt city wall. In the Middle Ages, wood rafted down the Rhine from South Germany was piled on the riverbank in front of the gates and the wood market was held here, which gave the tower and gate their name.

Like other towers in the city walls, the Wood Tower also served as a gaol in the late mediaeval and early modern periods. Thus in 1793, after the reconquest of the previously French city of Mayence by Prussia, so-called 'Clubists', members of the Jacobin club who had organised the Republic of Mainz, were imprisoned in the Wood Tower. But its most prominent inmates were Johannes Bückler, known as 'Schinderhannes', and the members of his gang, who spent more than 15 months there before being guillotined under French law in November 1803 on what had been the grounds of the Electoral Favorite Palace.

== Sources ==
- Carl Klein. "Das Holzturm in Mainz". Mainzer Zeitschrift des Vereins zur Erforschung der rheinischen Geschichte und Altertümer, 1862
- Ernst Stephan. Das Bürgerhaus in Mainz. Das deutsche Bürgerhaus XVIII. Tübingen: Wasmuth, 1974, repr. 1982. ISBN 3-8030-0020-3
- Rolf Dörrlamm, Susanne Feick, Hartmut Fischer and Hans Kersting. Mainzer Zeitzeugen aus Stein. Baustile erzählen 1000 Jahre Geschichte. Mainz: Hermann Schmidt, 2001. ISBN 3-87439-525-1
- Günther Gillessen, ed. Wenn Steine reden könnten - Mainzer Gebäude und ihre Geschichten. Mainz: von Zabern, 1991. ISBN 3-8053-1206-7
