= Jens Beutel =

German politician and judge (1946–2019)

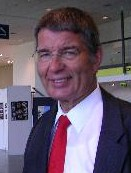
- Beutel in 2009

Mayor of Mainz
- In office 1997–2011
- Preceded by: Herman-Hartmut Weyel
- Succeeded by: Michael Ebling

Personal details
- Born: 12 July 1946 Lünen, Westphalia, Germany
- Died: 8 May 2019 (aged 72)
- Party: Social Democratic Party
- Education: University of Mainz
- Occupation: Judge; Mayor

Jens Beutel (12 July 1946 – 8 May 2019) was a German judge and politician. A member of the Social Democratic Party (SPD), he served as Oberbürgermeister (mayor) of Mainz, the state capital of Rheinland-Pfalz, from 1997 to 2011. During his tenure, the city improved especially by building projects, including the new synagogue, and new parks.

== Career ==
Born in Lünen, Westphalia, Beutel studied law at the University of Mainz from 1968 to 1976 and then served as a judge in Frankenthal, Koblenz and Mainz. He presided over the Mainzer Landgericht in the Worms abuse cases, which received nationwide attention.

He began his political career as Ortsbeirat in Mombach, a borough of Mainz, in 1974. Beutel was elected to the city council of Mainz (Stadtrat) in 1989, where he focused on topics such as building, traffic, finance, commerce and sports. He became chairman of the Mainz SPD in 1995.

Beutel was elected as Oberbürgermeister in 1996, the first who was elected to the position directly by the citizens. He took up the office on 3 May. During his time as mayor, a new shopping passage, a new stadium and the new synagogue were built, the Sanctuary of Isis and Magna Mater was discovered. Projects which improved the appearance of the city included a new design of the parks along the Rhine river, especially a garage close to the Kurfürstliches Schloss which made more park area available, the Kunsthalle as part of the former Zollhafen, the expansion of the Rheingoldhalle and building along the Winterhafen. The expansion of the Staatstheater Mainz by a modern rooftop was discussed controversially. Other projects were the expansion of the Main Station, and a redesign of the area around Mainz Römisches Theater station at the Roman Theatre.

Beutel was for many years president of the Städtetag Rheinland-Pfalz, and of the International Gutenberg-Gesellschaft (Gutenberg Society). He was active in the Council of European Municipalities and Regions and in several foundations in Mainz. Beutel was re-elected for a second term as mayor in 2004. He resigned in 2011, after a 2010 court case because he had accepted an invitation to a trip to Italy by an entrepreneur without a political reason.

Beutel died on 8 May 2019 aged 72.

== Chess ==
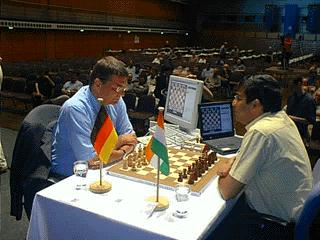
Jens Beutel and Viswanathan Anand, Chess Classic Mainz 2002

Beutel started playing chess at age 13 and became an expert player. He managed to attract the Chess Classic tournament to Mainz.

== Legacy ==
Beutel's successor Michael Ebling (SPD) credited Beutel as a man of balance and dialogue (Mann des Ausgleichs und des Dialogs) and a committed team player, who always emphasized the community in the city (als engagierten Teamplayer, der stets das Gemeinschaftliche in unserer Stadt betonte).

== See also ==
- List of mayors of Mainz
- List of Social Democratic Party of Germany politicians
