= Griebens Reise-Bibliothek =

German-language travel guide book series

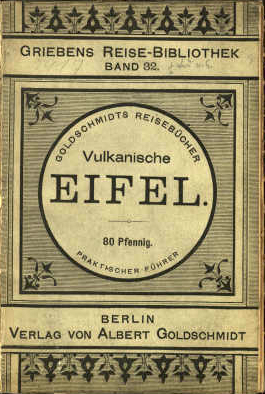
Cover of Die Vulkanische Eifel, 1889

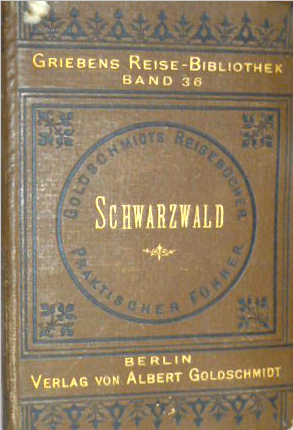
Cover of Schwarzwald, 1890

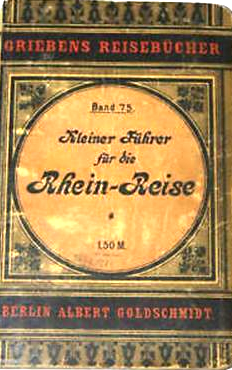
Cover of Rhein-Reise, 1900

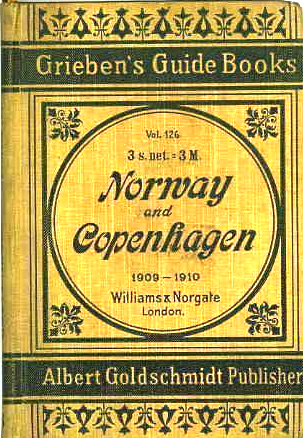
Cover of Norway and Copenhagen, 1910

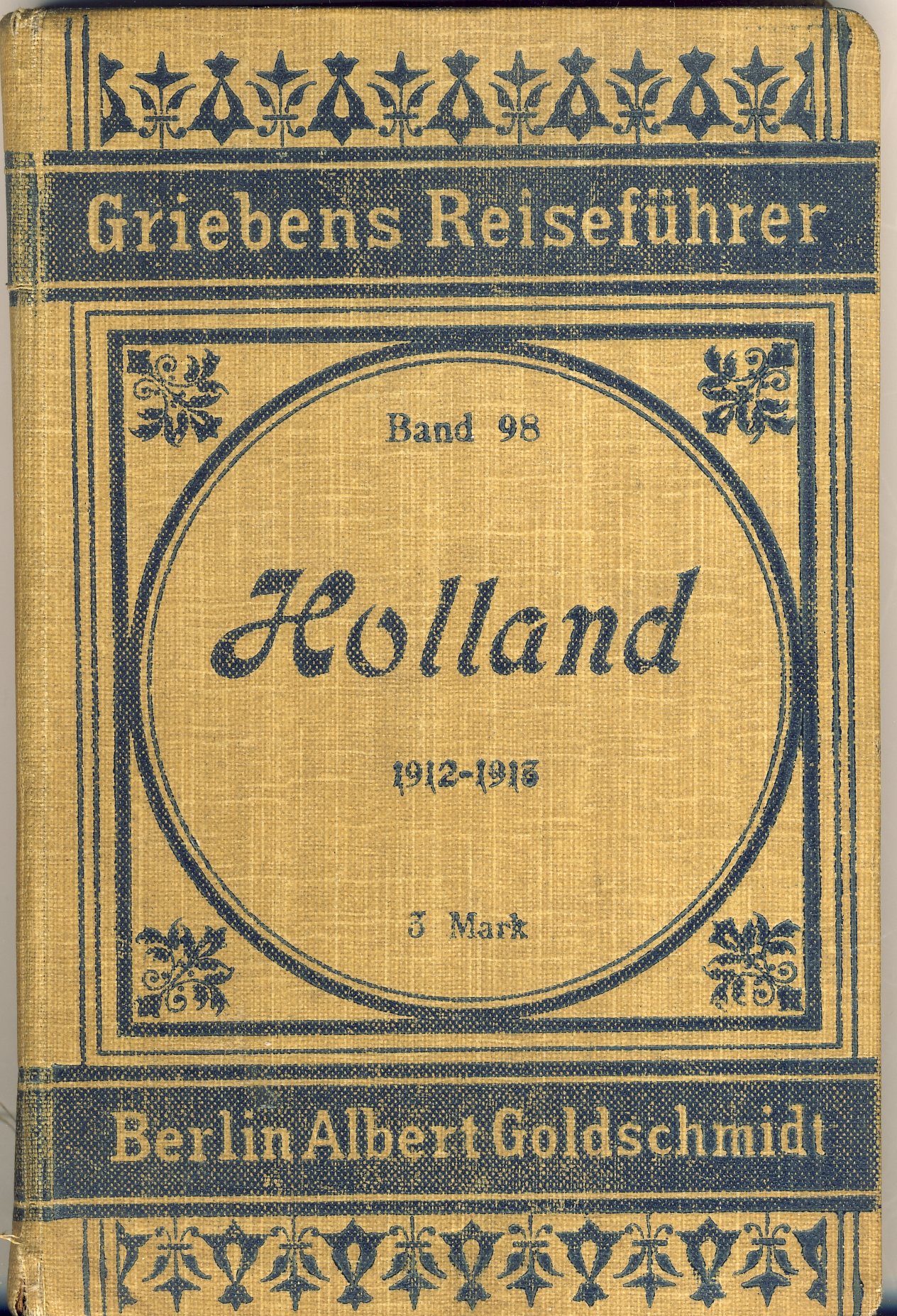
Cover of Holland, Griebens Reiseführer, 1912

Griebens Reise-Bibliothek (est. 1853) was a series of German-language travel guide books to Europe, founded by Theobald Grieben of Berlin. Some titles occasionally appeared in English or French language editions. Compared with its competitor Baedeker, Griebens was "cheaper and less detailed." A 1914 British reviewer judged it "informative and not bulky, going easily into the coat pocket." Readers included Thomas Wolfe. In 1863 publisher Albert Goldschmidt bought the series and continued it; in the 1890s the Goldschmidt office sat on Köthener Straße in Berlin. By the 1950s Griebens was issued by Jürgen E. Rohde of Munich.

== List of titles by geographic coverage ==
=== Austria ===
- Bayr, Hochland, Salzburg, Salzkammergut. Griebens Reiseführer (in German). 1920.
- Wien. Griebens Reiseführer. Bd. 68 (in German). 1903.

=== Belgium ===
- H. T. Luks (1891). Belgien und Holland. Griebens Reise-Bibliothek (in German). Vol. 22 (5th ed.). Berlin: Albert Goldschmidt – via Google Books. + index
- Belgium. Grieben's Guide Books. Vol. 141. London: Williams & Norgate. 1910. (in English) + index
- Brussel (in German).

=== Czech Republic ===
- Prag. Grieben's Reise-Bibliothek; no. 26 (in German) (5th ed.). A. Goldschmidt. 1877.

=== Great Britain ===
- London (in German).

=== France ===
- Paris. Grieben's Reise-Bibliothek; no. 21 (in German). A. Goldschmidt. 1886.
  - 1913 ed.

=== Germany ===
- Berlin. Griebens Reiseführer (in German). Berlin: Albert Goldschmidt. 1920 – via Internet Archive.
  - Berlin. (in English)
- Berlin, Potsdam und Umgebungen. Grieben's Reise-Bibliothek. Bd. 6 (in German). Vol. 6 (37th ed.). A. Goldschmidt. 1891.
- Bremen (in German).
- Breslau (in German).
- Cassel und Wilhelmshöhe. Griebens Reiseführer (in German). 1919.
- Deutschland (in German).
- Dresden. Grieben's Reise-Bibliothek; no. 4 (in German) (2nd ed.). T. Grieben. 1857.
  - Dresden. Grieben's guide books, vol. 128. A. Goldschmidt; Williams & Norgate. 1910. (in English)
- Düsseldorf (in German).
- Frankfurt a.M. Griebens Reiseführer (in German). A. Goldschmidt. 1912.
- Freiburg i. Br (in German).
- Hamburg. Griebens Reiseführer (in German). A. Goldschmidt. 1912.
- Hannover und Hildesheim. Griebens Reiseführer (in German). Vol. 151 (2nd ed.). Berlin: Albert Goldschmidt. 1914 – via HathiTrust.
- Heidelberg und Neckerthal. Griebens Reiseführer (in German). 1918.
- Kiel. Griebens Reiseführer (in German). 1913.
- Köln und Düsseldorf (in German).
- Leipzig (in German).
- Mecklenburg. Griebens Reiseführer (in German). 1919.
- München. Grieben's Reise-Bibliothek, No. 19 (in German) (11th ed.). A. Goldschmidt. 1867.
  - Munich and Environs. Grieben's Travelling-Bibliothek (10th ed.). Berlin. 1866. (in English)
- Nürnberg (in German) (3rd ed.). 1873.
  - Nuremberg and Rothenburg on the Tauber. Grieben's guide books, vol. 153. A. Goldschmidt; Williams & Norgate. 1911. (in English)
- Potsdam (in German).
- Kleiner Führer für die Rhein-Reise von Köln bis Frankfurt. Griebens Reisebücher (in German). Vol. 75. Berlin: Albert Goldschmidt. 1900 – via Google Books.
- Die Sächsische Schweiz mit dem angrenzenden Böhmischen Mittelgebirge. Griebens Reiseführer (in German). Vol. 16. Berlin: Albert Goldschmidt. 1921.
- Strassburg (in German). 1914.
- Stuttgart (in German).
- Thüringen. Griebens Reiseführer (in German). 1919.
- Die Vulkanische Eifel (in German). Vol. 32. 1889 – via Europeana.

=== Greece ===
- Athen und Umgebung. Grieben Reisefuhrer. 1937.

=== Italy ===
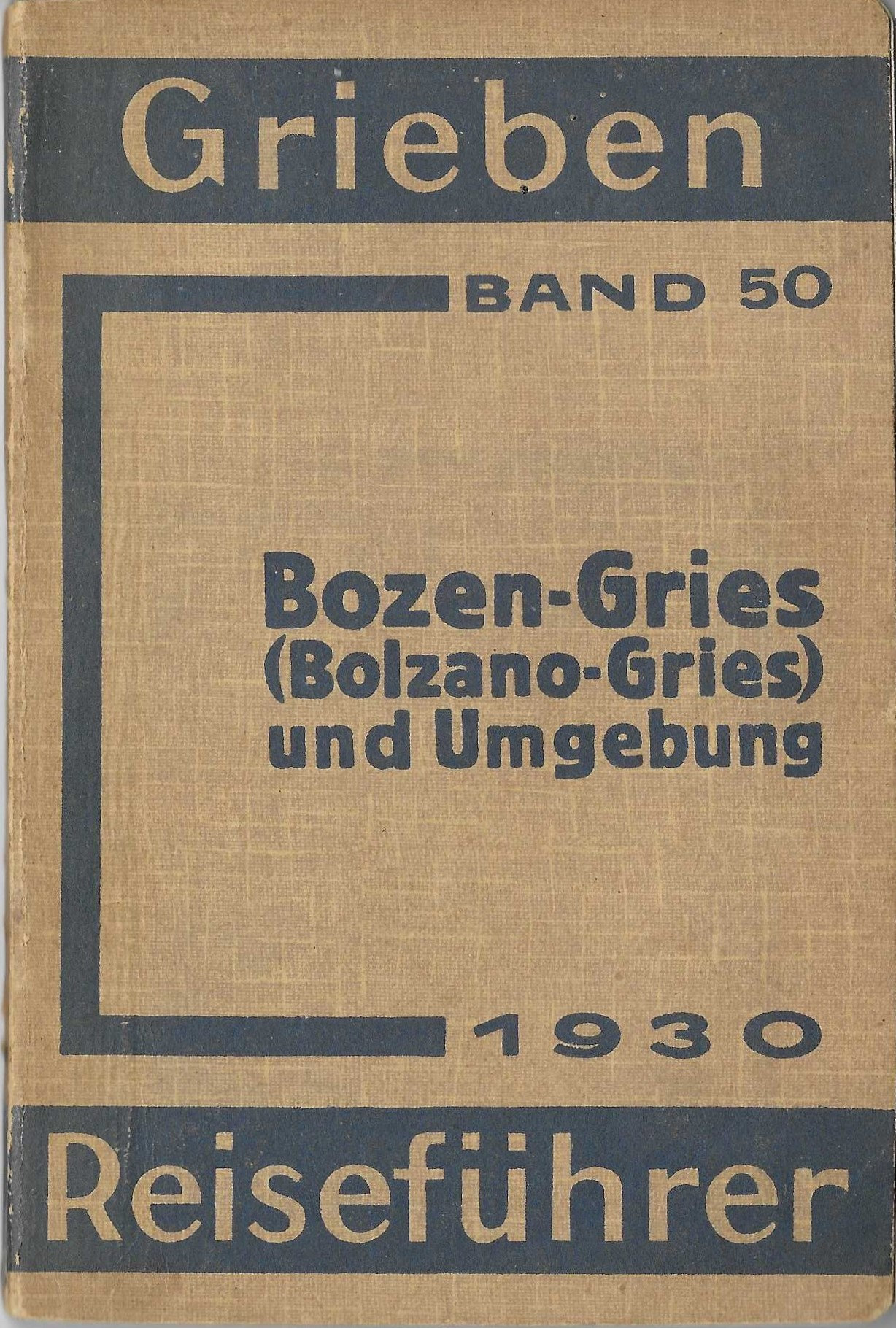
Grieben Bozen-Gries 1930 Guide Cover

- W. Schultz-Riesenberg (1911). Neapel und Capri. Griebens Reiseführer (in German). Vol. 101.
- Ober-Italien und Florenz (in German).
- Schultz-Riesenberg, W. (1907). Die Oberitalienischen Seen. Griebens Reiseführer (in German). Vol. 15. + index
- Bozen-Gries (Bolzano-Gries). Griebens Reiseführer (in German). Vol. 50. 1930.

=== Netherlands ===
- Holland. Griebens Reisführer (in German). Vol. 98 (13th ed.). 1912–1913. OCLC 249915529.

=== Poland ===
- Die Grafschaft Glatz. Griebens Reiseführer (in German). Vol. 147. 1920 – via Europeana.

=== Russia ===
- Saint-Petersbourg. Bibliothèque des voyageurs de Grieben (in French). Vol. 27 (11th ed.). Berlin: Albert Goldschmidt. 1887 – via HathiTrust.

=== Scandinavia ===
- Finland (in German).
- Kopenhagen (in German).
- Schweden, Norwegen und Danemark (in German).
- Stockholm (in German). 1886.

=== Switzerland ===
- Theodor Stromer, ed. (1891). Die Schweiz. Griebens Reise-Bibliothek (in German). Vol. 23 (15th ed.). Berlin: Albert Goldschmidt. + index
  - Theodor Stromer, ed. (1895). Die Schweiz. Griebens Reisebücher (in German). Vol. 23 (17th ed.). Berlin: Albert Goldschmidt. + index
  - 1907 ed.
- Switzerland. Grieben's Guide Books. Vol. 123 (2nd ed.). Berlin: Albert Goldschmidt. 1912. (in English) + index

=== United States ===
- Eugen Comely (1893). New York und Chicago (in German). Vol. 86. OCLC 258230238.
