= Heinrich Krone =

German politician

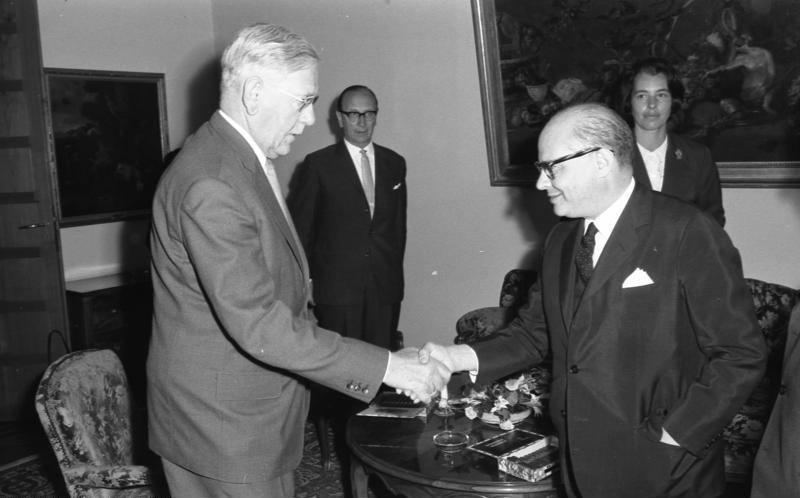
- Krone (left) meeting Colombian politician Carlos Lleras Restrepo, 1964

Member of the Bundestag
- In office 7 September 1949 – 19 October 1969

Personal details
- Born: 1 December 1895 Hessisch Oldendorf, German Empire
- Died: 15 August 1989 (aged 93) Bonn, West Germany
- Party: CDU

Heinrich Krone (1 December 1895 – 15 August 1989) was a German politician of the Christian Democratic Union (CDU).

Shortly after beginning his Theology study in 1914, Krone was drafted into service in World War I. After the war Krone continued his study, joining the Catholic Center Party in 1923. He held a variety of positions within the party before being elected to the Reichstag in 1925. He remained in the Reichstag until 1933. Immediately following the defeat of the Third Reich, Krone played an integral role in establishing the new Christian Democratic Union (CDU) party in Berlin. In 1949 he served in the first post-war West German federal parliament, the Bundestag. From 1955 to 1961 he served as the chairman of the CDU faction in the Bundestag, and was a trusted colleague of Chancellor Konrad Adenauer. He remained in the Bundestag until 1969, serving several times as a minister under Chancellors Konrad Adenauer and Ludwig Erhard.
