= Gutenberg Museum =

Museum in Mainz, Germany

Coordinates: 49°59′59″N 8°16′31″E

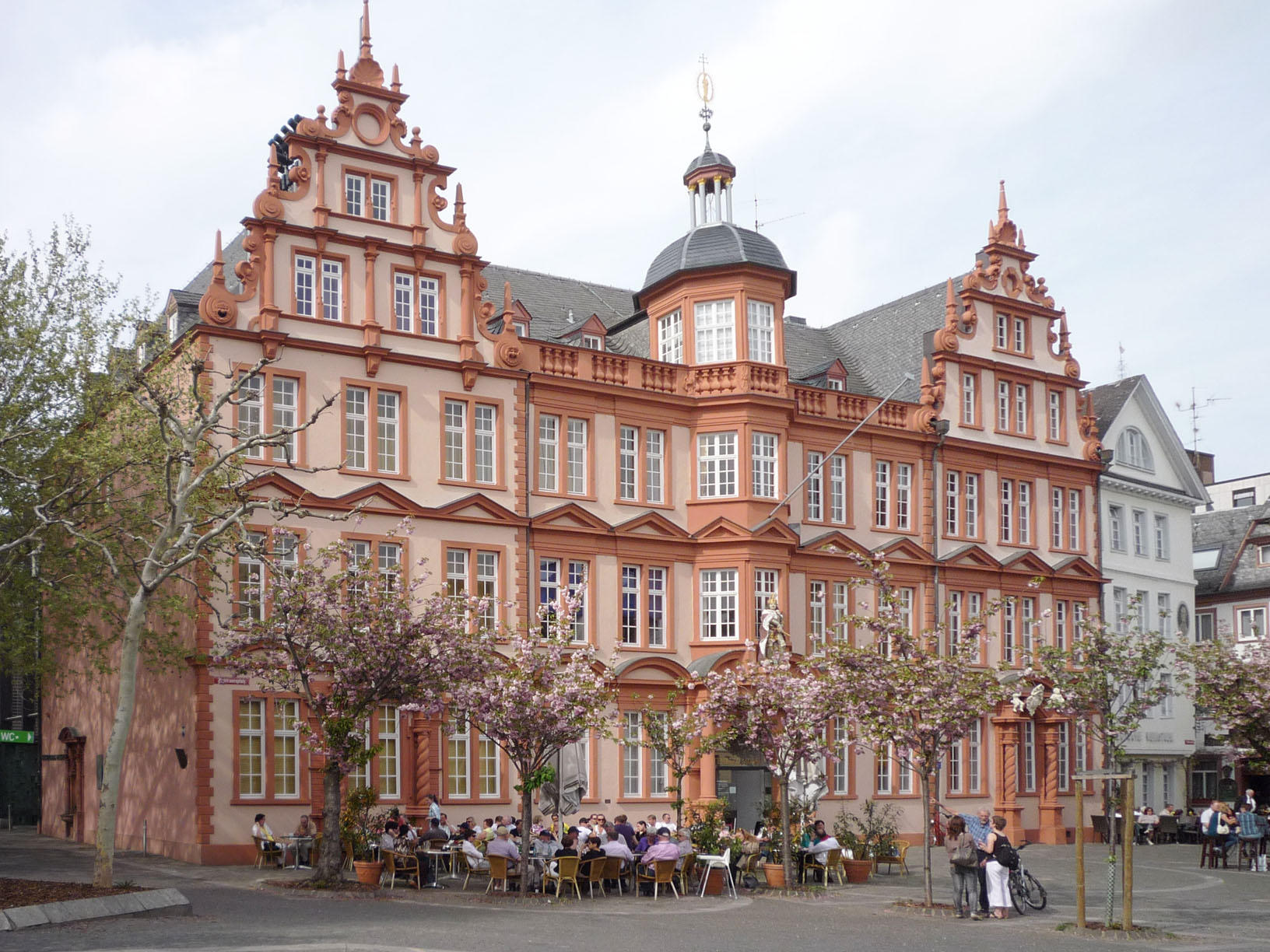
House "Zum Römischen Kaiser", today: Gutenberg Museum

Gutenberg Museum

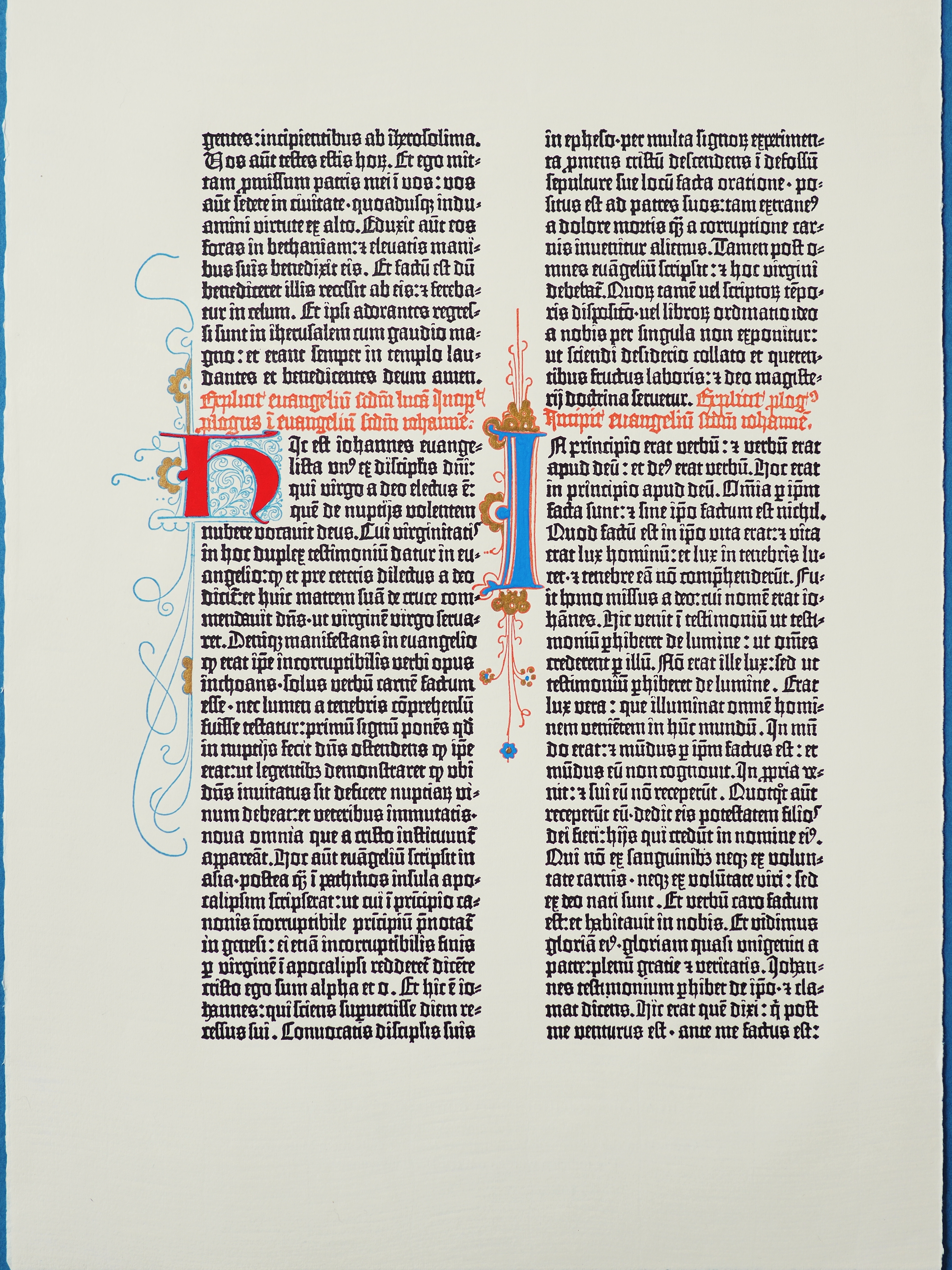
A type facsimile of a page from the Gutenberg Bible, printed at the museum

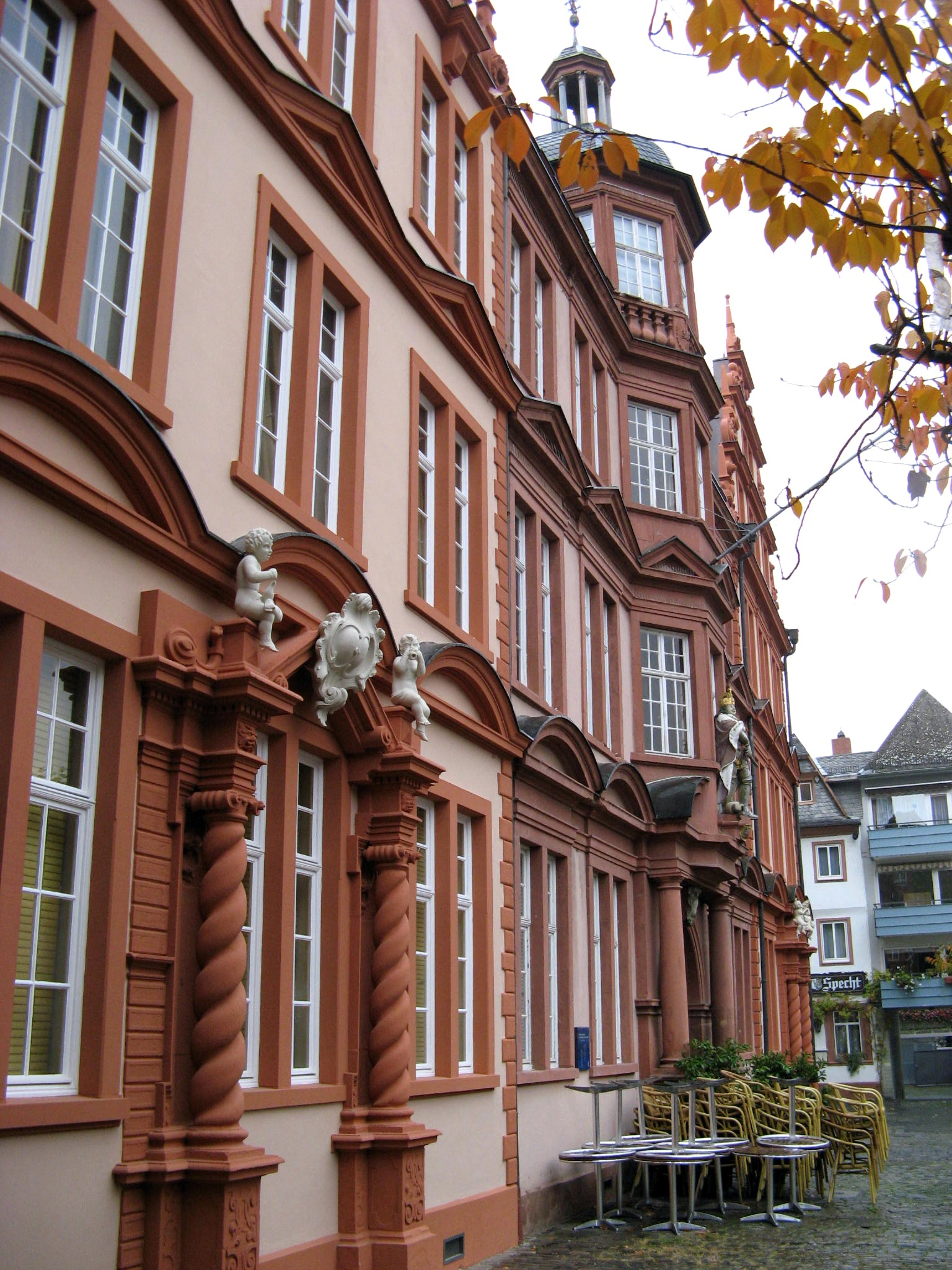
Older part of the Gutenberg Museum in the Zum Römischen Kaiser house, Mainz

The Gutenberg Museum is one of the oldest museums of printing in the world, located opposite the cathedral in the old part of Mainz, Germany. It is named after Johannes Gutenberg, the inventor of printing from movable metal type in Western Europe. The collections include printing equipment and examples of printed materials from many cultures.

== History ==
A group of people founded the museum in 1900, 500 years after Johannes Gutenberg’s birth, to honor the inventor and present his technical and artistic achievements to the public at large. They also aimed to exhibit the writing and printing of as many different cultures as possible.

Publishers, manufacturers of printing machines and printing houses donated books, apparatus and machines, which formed the basis of the collection. In its first few years the museum was part of the city library, meaning that the most beautiful and characteristic volumes from the library’s extensive collection could be requisitioned for the museum. Visitors were thus presented with a survey of almost 500 years of the printed book. In time the museum expanded to include sections on printing techniques, book art, job printing and ex-libris, graphics and posters, paper, the history of writing of all cultures of the world and modern artists’ books.

The Gutenberg Museum was originally laid out in two rooms at the Kurfürstliches Schloß (Electoral Palace Mainz), which also accommodated the city library. The museum moved into the new library building on the Rheinallee in 1912. The same year, 1925, saw the installation of a reconstruction of Gutenberg's workshop which soon became one of the museum's main attractions. Type founding, typesetting and printing could now be demonstrated visually. The replica of Gutenberg's printing press, rebuilt according to the 15th- and 16th-century woodcuts, proved an object of great interest to visitors and was henceforth shown at a large number of exhibitions all over the world.

In 1927 the museum was able to move into the building Zum Römischen Kaiser (1664) in Mainz. This is now where the museum's administration, the restoration workshop, library, Gutenberg Society and the domicile of the Mainzer Stadtschreiber are housed. The Late Renaissance building was heavily bombed in 1945; the museum's contents had been stored in a safe place and thus remained intact. In 1962, the restoration of the Römischer Kaiser was complete. A new, modern exhibition building was also opened in the place where once the guest house König von England stood.

== Acquisitions ==
The museum made several important acquisitions in the following years, among them a second Gutenberg Bible, the Shuckburgh Bible in two volumes (1978), and two block books printed using wooden formes and today extremely rare. Another major change was the introduction of the museum's educational unit in 1989. In 2000, the old museum building was restored and extended.

== Exhibitions ==
The Bookplate Collection

The Gutenberg Museum's collection of bookplates, or ex-libri, is the most comprehensive public collection in the Federal Republic of Germany and one of the most important worldwide. The collection began in the mid-twentieth century with donation of a few dozen bookplates and grew greatly in 1963 when Willy Tropp, one of the most important bookplate collectors of the time, donated approximately 50,000 bookplates. The collection contains bookplates that belonged to such famous and infamous figures as Charles Lindbergh, Albert Einstein, Charles Dickens, Franklin D. Roosevelt and Adolf Hitler. Today the collection numbers at around 100,000 bookplates.

Printed Graphics

The Gutenberg-Museum has an extensive collection of printed graphics which include depictions of printers and technical illustrations and artists’ prints representing various techniques. Exhibited at various points throughout the museum's permanent displays, the collection also consists of thousands of stored prints that can be viewed through appointment upon request to the museum.

Small Presses

The Mainzer Minipressen-Archiv is an archive of literary works by small printing shops rarely admitted to mainstream libraries. Included in the collections are books, magazines, videos, posters, flyers and leaflets from small presses throughout Europe.

== See also ==
- Gutenberg-Jahrbuch
