= Martinsburg, Mainz =

Coordinates: 50.0068°N 8.2711°E

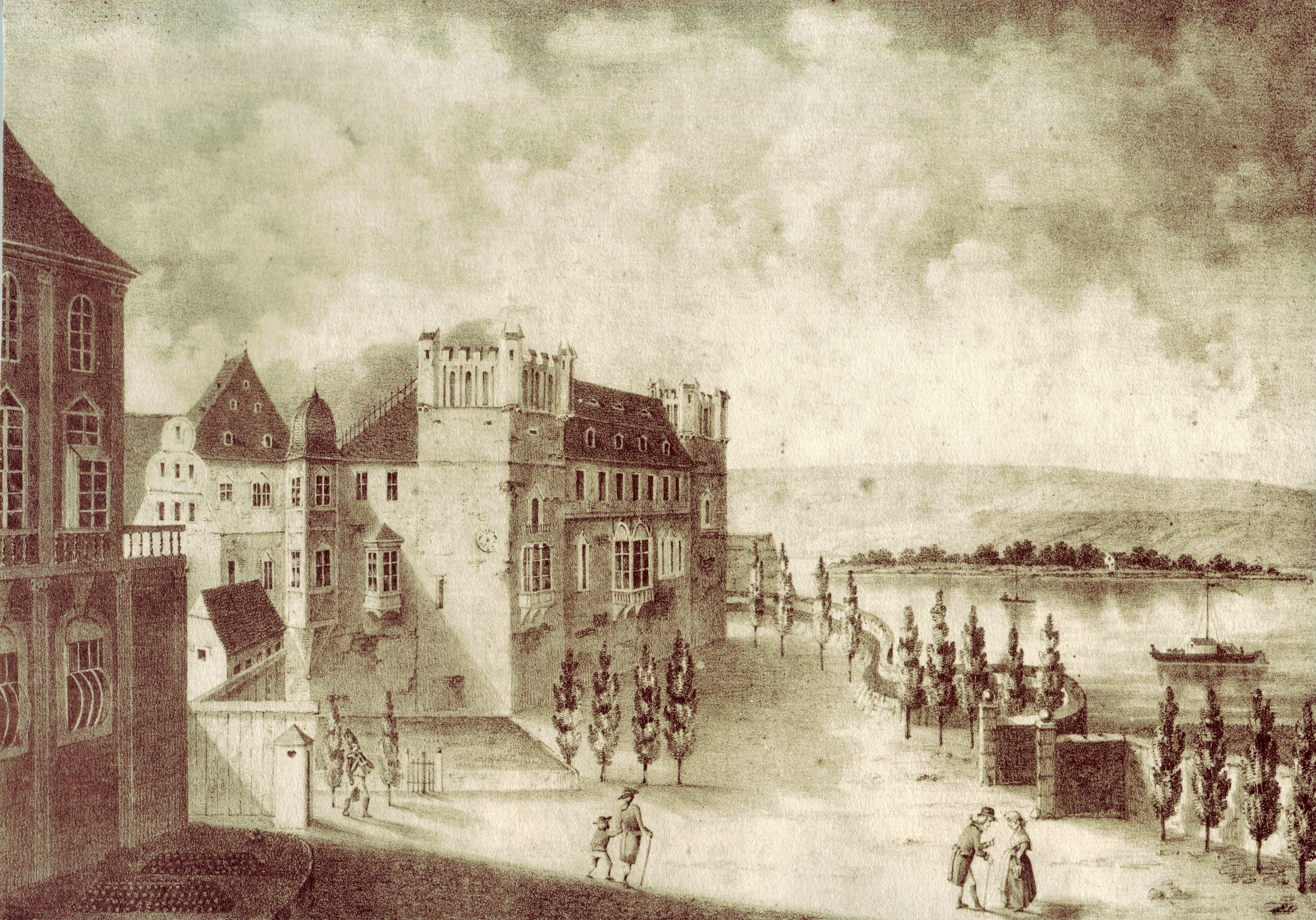
The Martinsburg

The Martinsburg is a former plains castle in Mainz. It lay on the banks of the Rhine, adjacent to the space where the Electoral Palace now stands.

== History ==
The castle was built from 1478 to 1481 at the order of Diether von Isenburg. Its position suggests that the Archbishop and Elector did not have it built as a defense against strangers, but as a retreat against the citizens of the city of Mainz. The actual location of the electoral residence in the city center, next to the Cathedral, had become uncertain in the Mainz Diocesan Feud. The location of the castle on the banks of the Rhine on the other hand allowed a quick escape to the other residence places Eltville and Aschaffenburg. The arrangement of the trench towards the city favors this thesis.

Napoleon finally decided on the end of Martinsburg at the beginning of the 19th century. In 1806 or 1807 the castle was demolished in favor of the bridge and harbor construction. As a testimony of their existence a few stone blocks of its walls in the former trench can be seen in front of the electoral castle towards the river Rhine today.
