= Electoral Palace, Mainz =

Palace in Germany

Electoral Palace
- Kurfürstliches Schloss
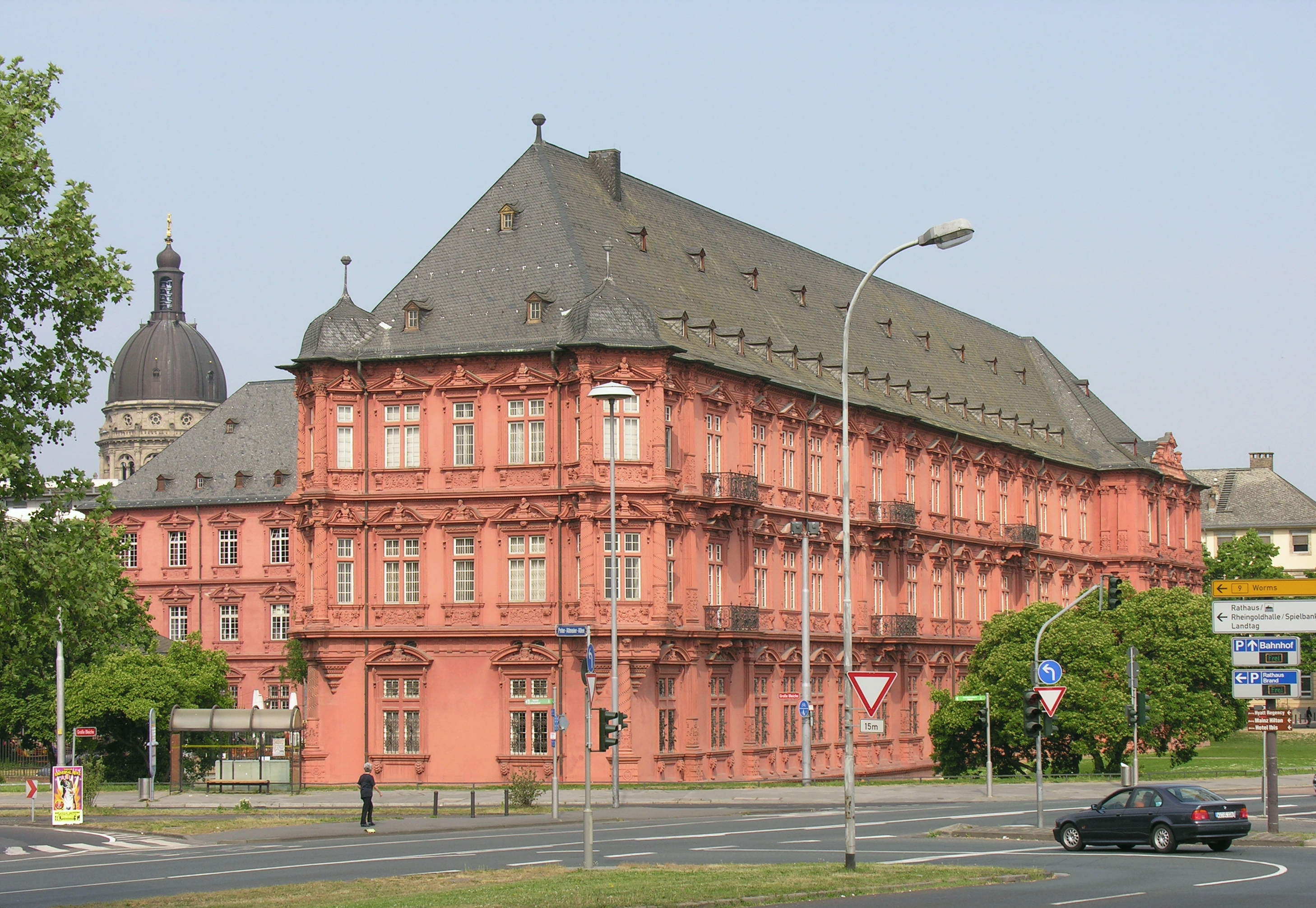
- Southeast façade of the Electoral Palace
- Interactive map of the Electoral Palace area

General information
- Architectural style: Renaissance; Baroque
- Location: Mainz, Germany
- Coordinates: 50°00′24″N 8°16′14″E
- Named for: Prince-elector and Archbishop of Mainz
- Construction started: 1627
- Completed: 1752

Design and construction
- Architect: Matthew of Saarburg

The Electoral Palace in Mainz (German: Kurfürstliches Schloss zu Mainz) is the former city Residenz of the Prince-elector and Archbishop of Mainz. It is one of the important Renaissance buildings in Germany.

== Background ==
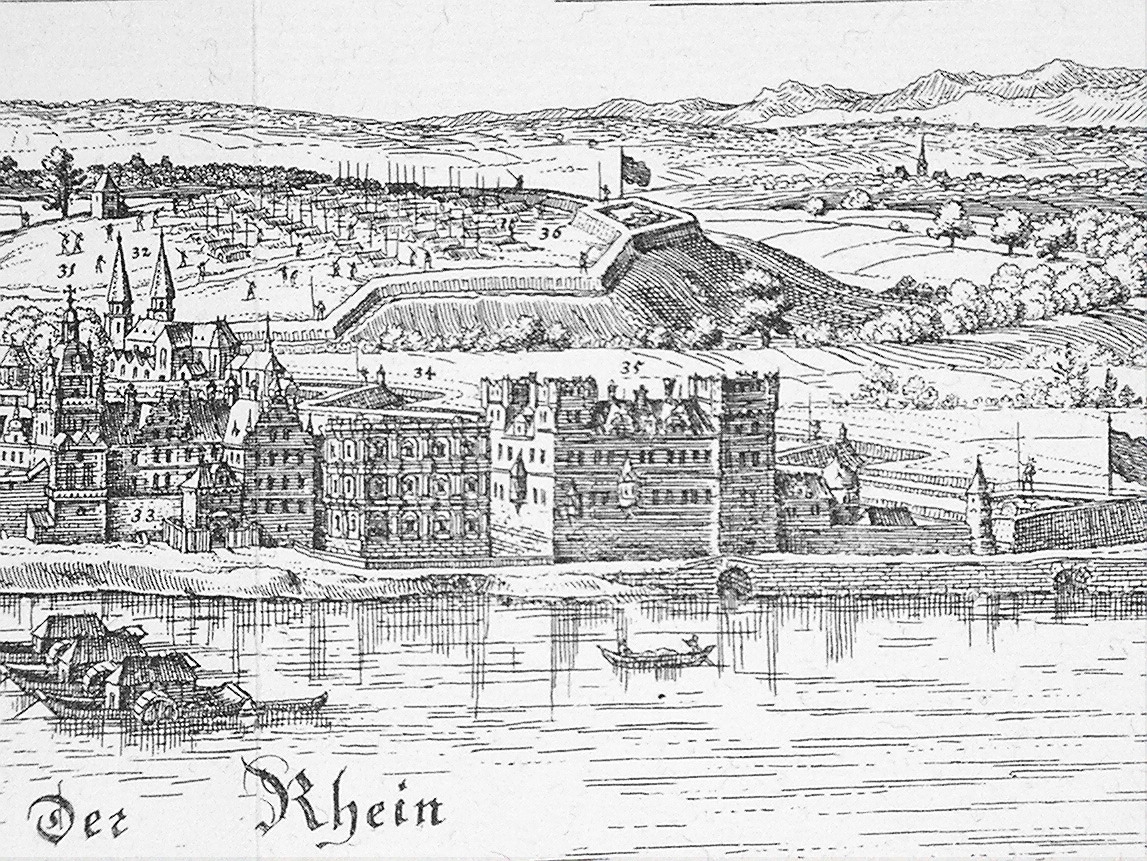
The Martinsburg, c. 1675

Originally, the Archbishop of Mainz resided at the cathedral, where there is an old private chapel dating from 1137, but in 1475, when the Chapter re-elected Diether von Isenburg, conditions were imposed: he had to surrender the town of Mainz to the Chapter, and erect a castle in the city. The construction of Martinsburg began in 1478 and was completed two years later. For several decades, the archbishops lived either there or in the electoral palace at Aschaffenburg, Schloss Johannisburg. After receiving damage during the second war with the margraves in 1552 the castle was restored in a Renaissance style. Archbishop Daniel Brendel von Homburg built office buildings and St Gangolph's Church around the year 1580. (In order to make way for new avenues, these buildings as well as Martinsburg were demolished by Napoleon during the French occupation of the town between 1798 and 1814.)

== History ==
The building of a new palace commenced in 1627 on the behest of Archbishop Georg Friedrich von Greiffenklau. The Rhine wing of the new palace could not be finished until 1678, construction being delayed by the Thirty Years War and the War of the Grand Alliance. The original plan is not known, but it was probably a four-wing construction, comparable to the 1604 repairs to Schloss Johannisberg. It can be assumed Martinsburg remained standing only because of the delays.

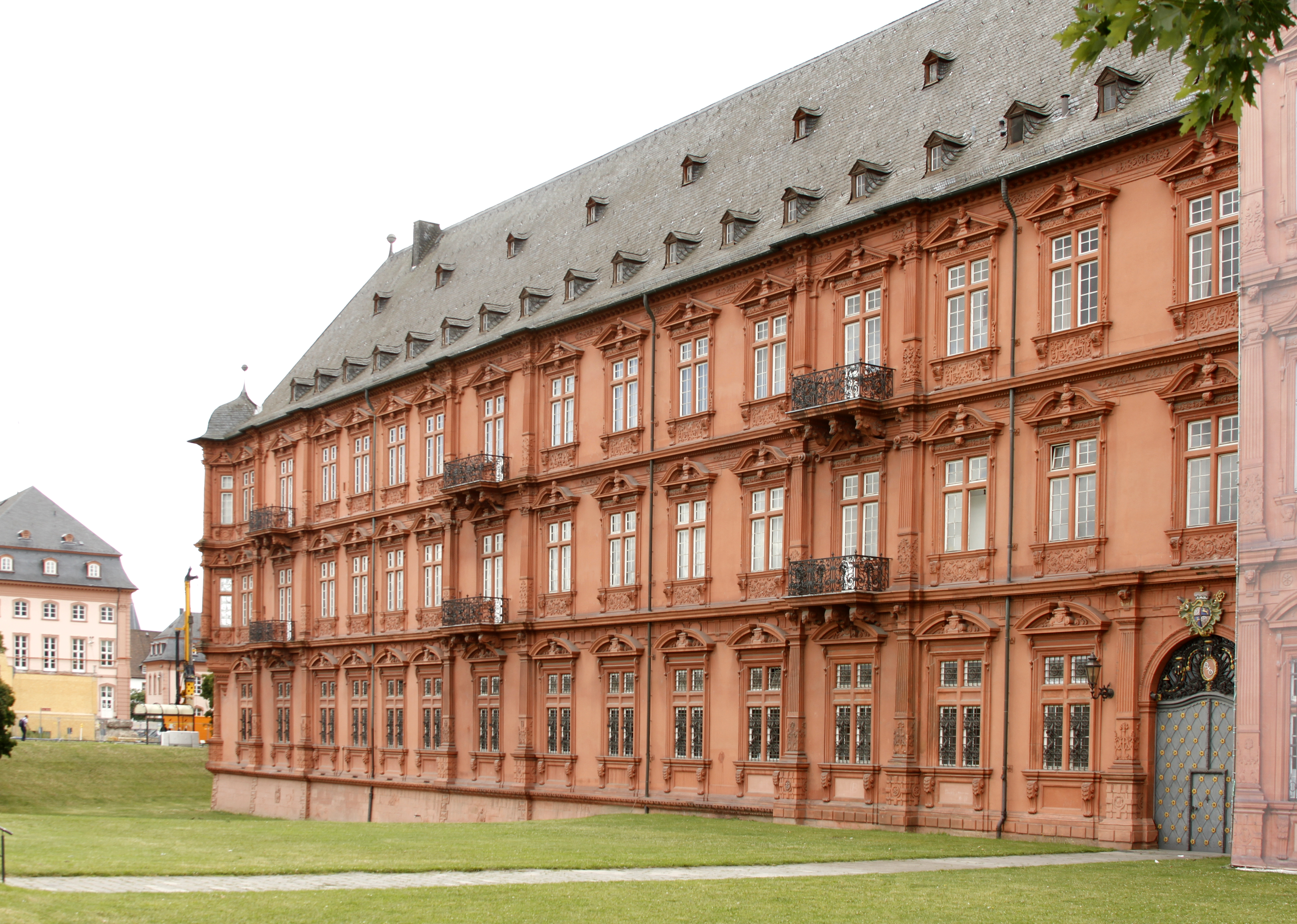
The principal façade, the East Front

The north wing was begun in 1687, ready by 1752, and furnished in succeeding years. Work on the wing extending away from the river was begun during the reigns of Johann Friedrich Karl von Ostein (1743–1763) and Friedrich Karl Josef von Erthal (1774–1802).

Delays were due not only to the War of the Grand Alliance, but also to the extensive building activity of the nobility: for example, the Lustschloss Favorite begun in 1700 by Lothar Franz von Schönborn absorbed large amounts of resources. That summer residence was destroyed during the Siege of Mainz by coalition shelling in 1793.

On 23 October 1792, the Jacobin Club, a political group during the French Revolution, was established on what nowadays is German soil. This was the earliest democratic movement in Germany. Archbishop Erthal was the last Prince-Elector of the old electorate and was expelled from the city in 1792. His successor Karl Theodor von Dalberg was both Archbishop-Elector of Mainz and Arch-Chancellor of the remaining Empire on the right bank of the Rhine. Due to the resolutions of the Reichsdeputationshauptschluss his seat was moved to Regensburg, which became the new seat of the archbishopric. The palace was neglected until 1827, when it was restored by the Grand Duchy of Hesse-Darmstadt and the City of Mainz.

During World War II, the building was heavily damaged, especially in the air raid of 27 February 1945, which destroyed most of the city. Of the palace, only the exterior walls remained. It was rebuilt during 1948 and 1949, reopened on 31 December 1949, and was the main venue in Mainz for Karneval activities until the Rheingoldhalle opened in 1968.

== Architecture ==
Stylistically, the Electoral Palace is one of the last examples of German Renaissance architecture. The northern wing, built later, conforms to this style. The exterior, with turrets at every corner, is richly decorated, particularly around the windows. The roofs have been restored with exactness. The most spectacular interiors included the Grand Staircase by the leading Baroque architect Balthasar Neumann, which was removed during the French occupation.

== Modern uses ==
Today the east wing houses the Römisch-Germanisches Zentralmuseum. An assortment of replicas and valuable original items presents a comprehensive picture of the cultural life of prehistoric times, of the Roman Empire, and of the early Middle Ages. The north wing contains the famous function hall from which the annual Mainz carnival TV show Mainz bleibt Mainz, wie es singt und lacht is broadcast. The Electoral Palace is now one of eight venues managed by Congress Centrum Mainz. There are seven halls and many smaller rooms, enabling events to be staged for up to 1,700 persons.

== See also ==
- Electoral Palace, Koblenz
- Electoral Palace, Trier
