= Place for thinking =

Art object

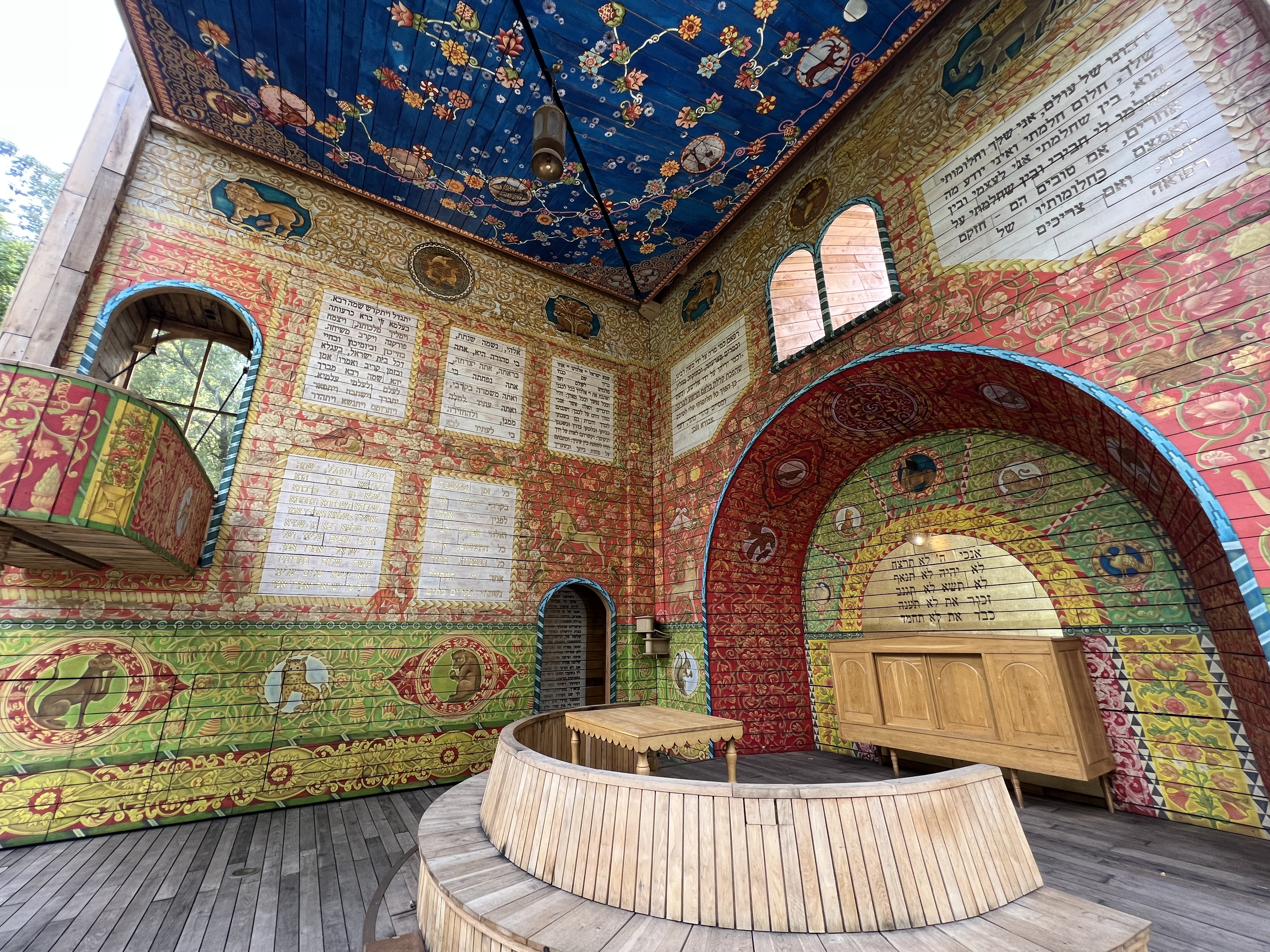
Babyn Yar symbolic synagogue

Symbolic synagogue and place for prayer in Babyn Yar («Place for thinking») - is an art object of the Babi Yar Holocaust Memorial Center, built on the territory of the National Historical Memorial Preserve "Babyn Yar" as a part of preparations to commemorate the 80th anniversary of the first massacres in Babyn Yar.

«Place for thinking» is constructed as a symbolic synagogue and is situated in Babyn Yar, next to the Menorah monument. The object is set to be opened with a praying ceremony in April 2021 timed to the Holocaust Remembrance Day (Yom HaShoah). The project was created by a world-renowned architect Manuel Hertz, assistant professor of architectural, urban, and territorial design at the University of Basel. He also designed a New Synagogue in Mainz, Germany.

The project was initiated by the Babi Yar Holocaust Memorial Center together with the chief rabbis of Kyiv and Ukraine, Yaakov Dov Bleich (A Union of the Judaical and Religious Organisations of Ukraine) and Moshe Reuven Azman (The All-Ukrainian Jewish Congress).

The initiative was also supported by the Metropolitan Epiphanius of Kyiv and All Ukraine, the head of the All-Ukrainian Council of Churches and Religious Organizations and the primate of the Orthodox Church of Ukraine (OCU).

== Concept ==
The art object «Place for thinking» is created as a symbolic memorial synagogue, opening and closing like a book with a special mechanism developed by the team of Ukrainian engineers.

''I was inspired by an idea that a synagogue can be a book which we all come to read together and end up in a universe of stories uncovering the history. The point is that it is going to be constructed on the holy ground. This will be not only the commemoration of the dead but also a look into the future for the living.'' — Manuel Hertz

When closed, the building is a flat, vertical structure which is to be opened manually. It, thus, unfolds into a three-dimensional synagogue space. The process of its opening is a collective ritual performed by the members of the congregation.

== Construction ==
The art object is erected without a foundation, on a wooden platform on the small site right after the Menorah Monument, the place where Jews traditionally gather to commemorate their relatives, who have died in Babyn Yar.

The construction of the «Place for thinking» as a symbolic memorial synagogue is executed on the basis of the permission No. 108/6.11.1 from 22.01.2021 issued by the Ministry of Culture and Information Policy of Ukraine.

It is made almost completely out of century-old oak wood, sourced from all over Ukraine.

Inside, the place is decorated with symbols and texts of prayers similar to the early synagogues of the Western Ukraine which were destroyed by the Nazis in the Second World War. The ceiling is painted with a myriad of symbols referencing the interior of the historic synagogues of Ukraine from the 17th and 18th centuries.
