= Synagogue architecture =

Style of architecture

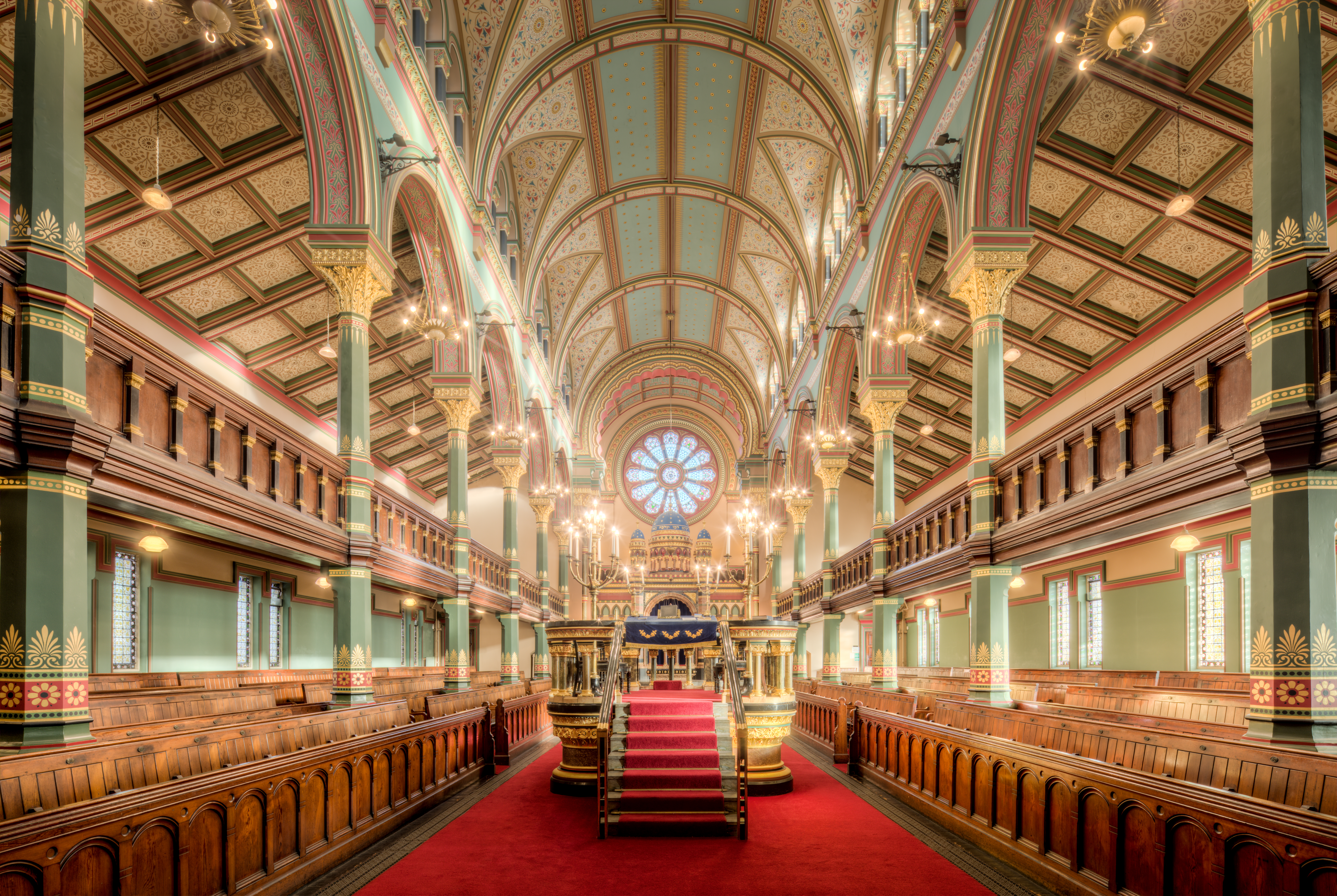
The late 19th century Princes Road Synagogue, Liverpool, United Kingdom

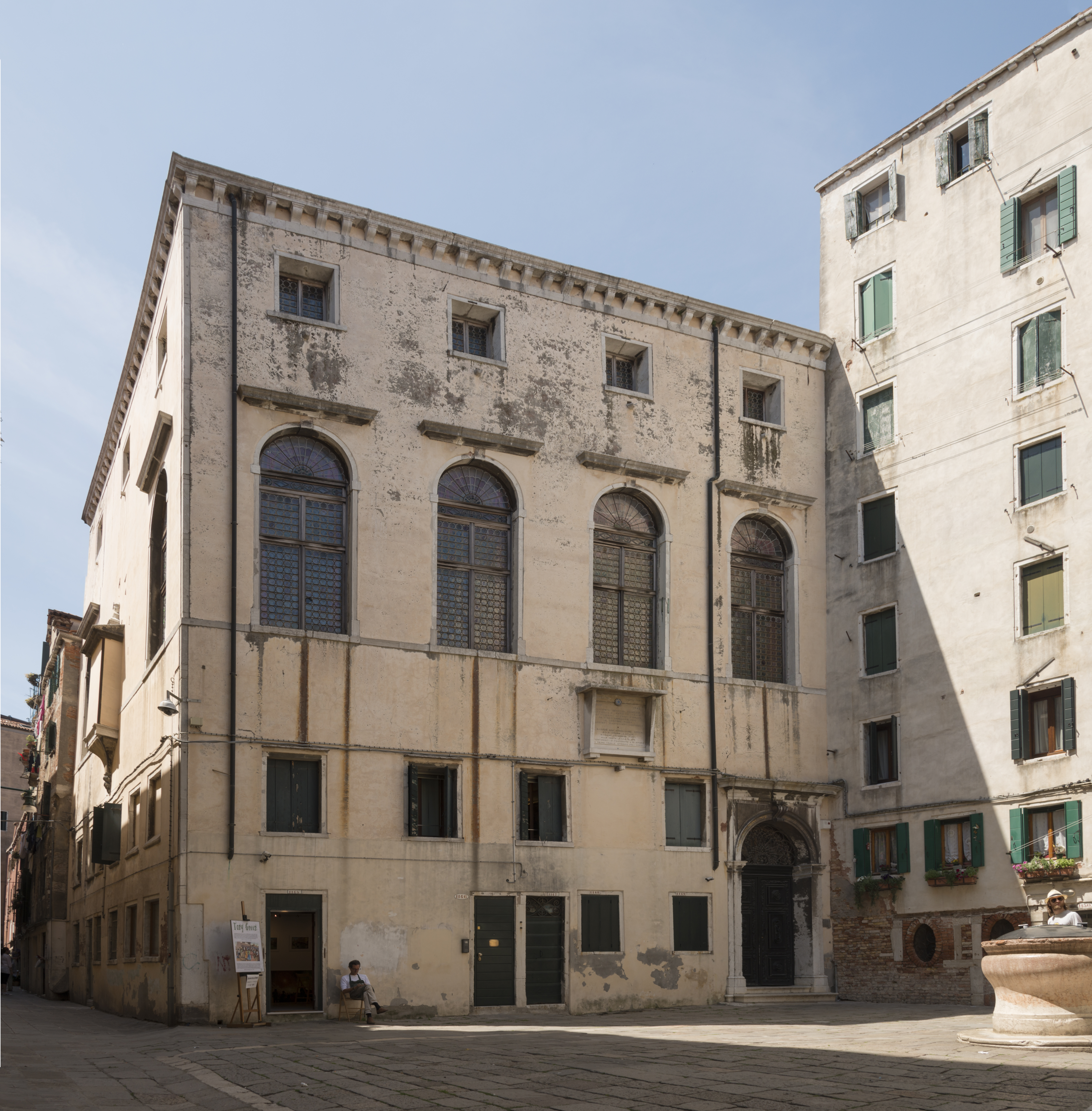
The 16th century Spanish Synagogue in Venice, Italy, a "hidden" synagogue not giving any external sign of its function.

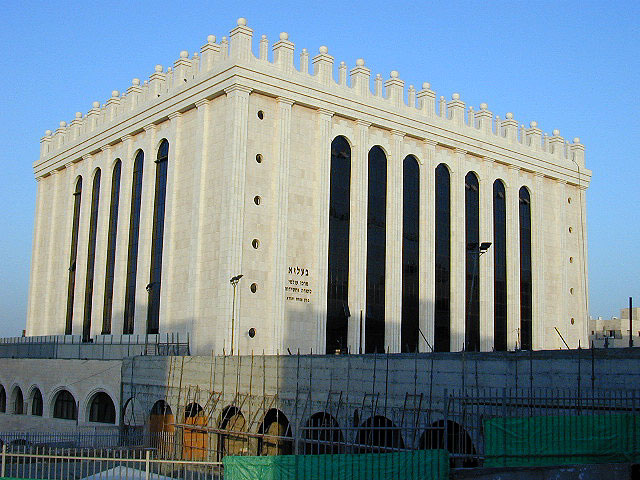
Oriental style—Belz Great Synagogue (2000), Jerusalem.

Synagogue architecture often follows styles in vogue at the place and time of construction. There is no set blueprint for synagogues and architectural shapes and interior designs of synagogues vary greatly. According to tradition, the Shekhinah or divine presence can be found wherever there is a minyan: the quorum of ten required for Jewish prayer.

Synagogues have some requirements. They always contain a Torah ark where the Torah scrolls are kept (called an aron qodesh (Hebrew: אָרוֹן קׄדֶש) by Ashkenazi Jews and a hekhal (היכל) by Sephardic Jews). Also, since synagogues are buildings for congregational worship, they require a large central space (like churches in Christianity and mosques in Islam). They are generally designed with the ark at one end, typically opposite the main entrance on the east side of the building, and a bema either in front of that or more centrally placed. Raised galleries for female worshipers have been common in historical buildings.

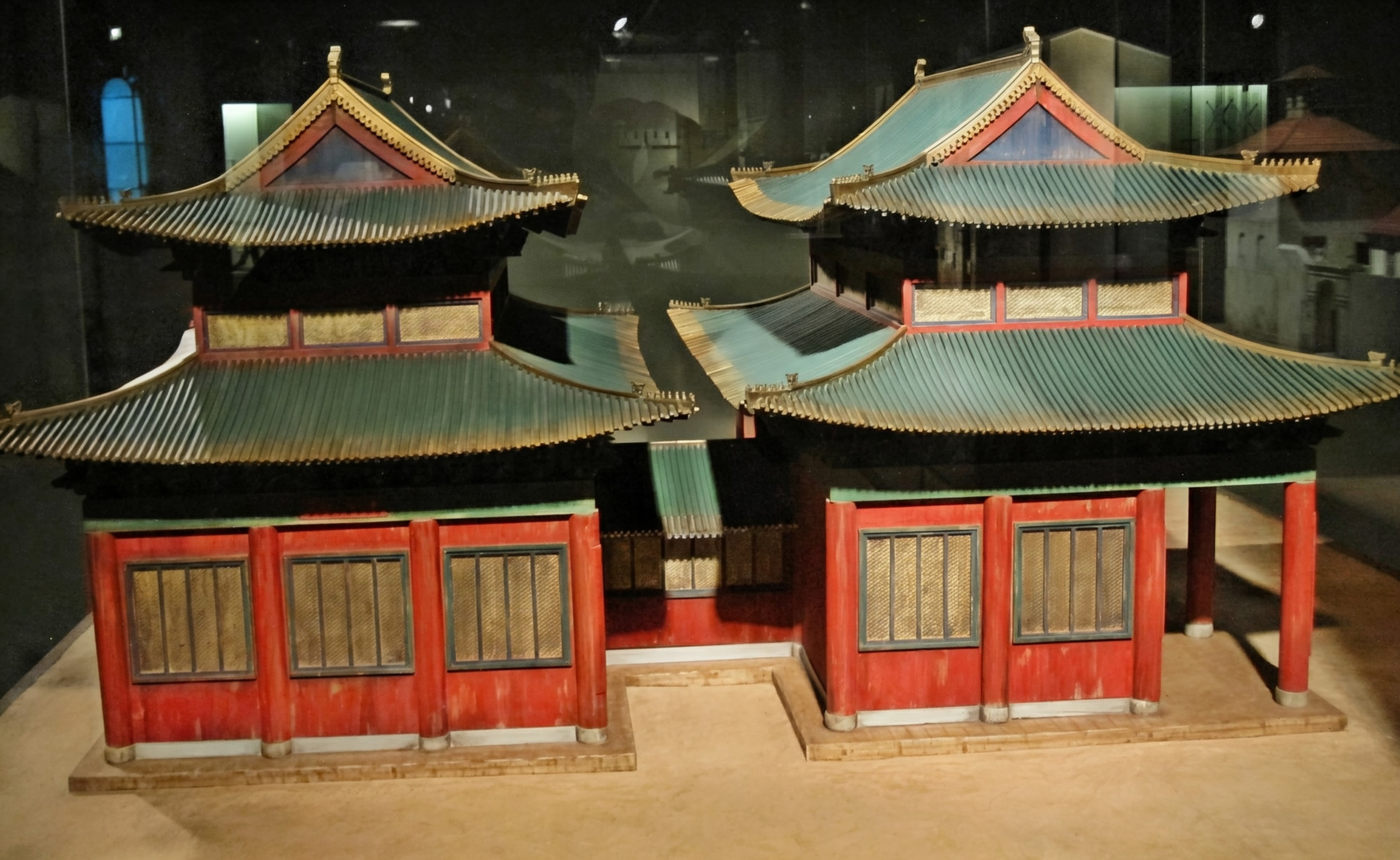
A model of the now-destroyed synagogue of Kaifeng or Qīngzhēn-sì (Chinese: 清真寺).

Beyond these requirements, there is little to dictate synagogue design. Historically, synagogues were typically according to prevailing architectural styles. For example, the synagogue of Kaifeng looked like Buddhist temples of that region and era, with its outer wall and open garden where several buildings were arranged.

== Considerations ==
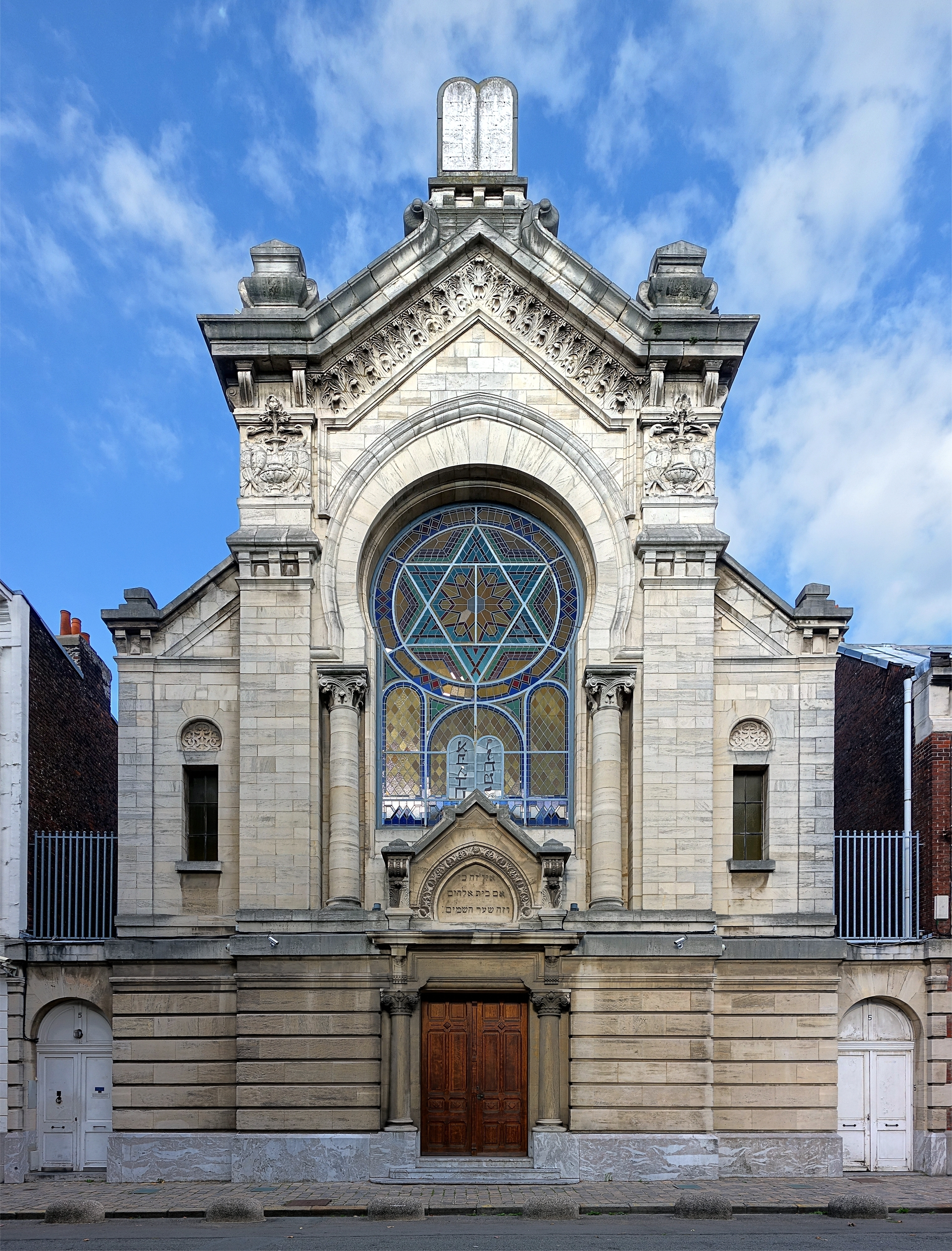
Lille Synagogue, France. An eclectic hybrid with Moorish, Romanesque, classical and Baroque elements, 1892.

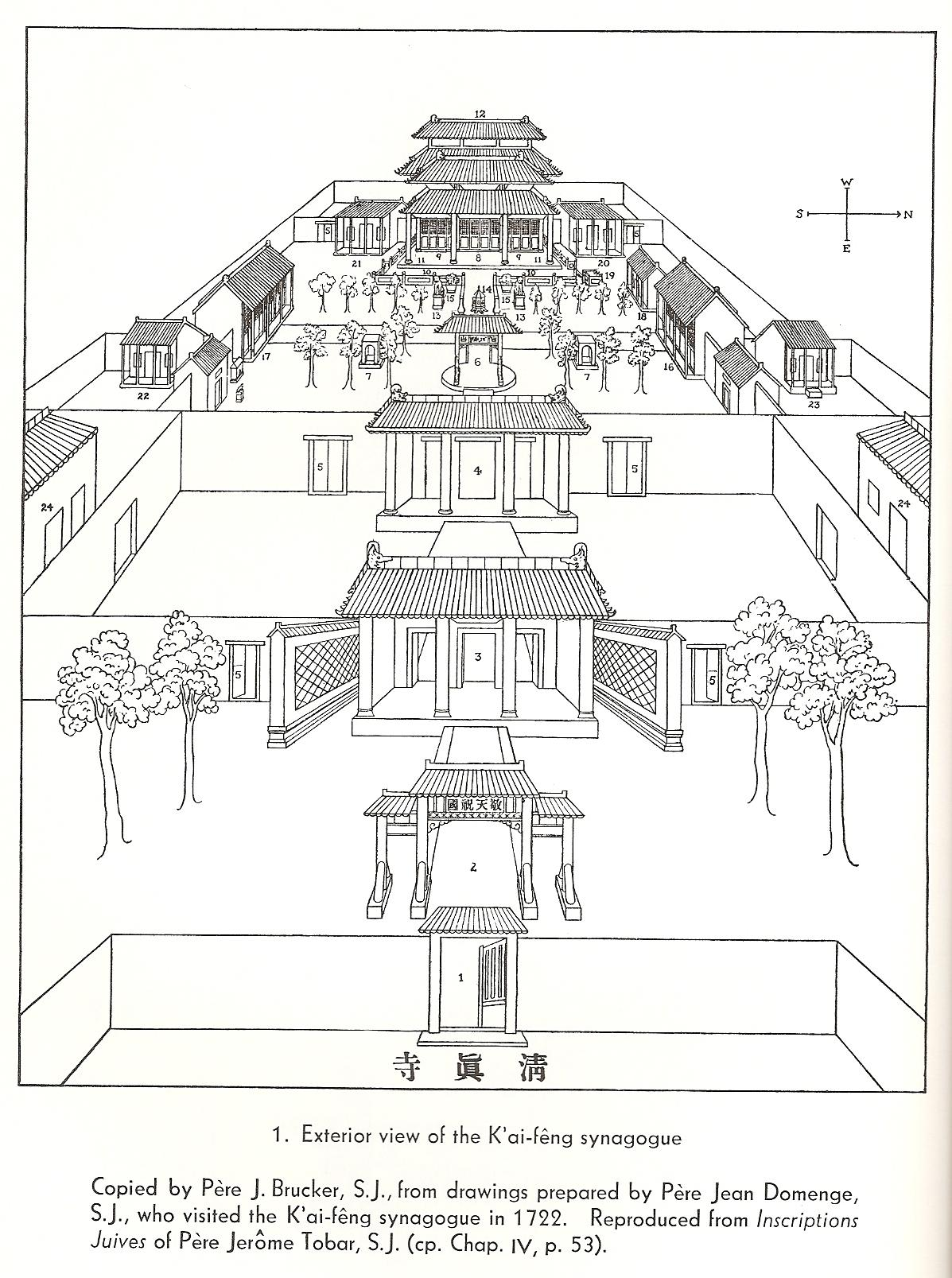
Synagogue of the Kaifeng Jewish community in China

The ark may be more or less elaborate, ranging from a cabinet not structurally integral to the building to a portable arrangement whereby a Torah scroll is brought into a space temporarily used for worship. There must also be a table, often on a raised platform, from which the Torah is read. The table or platform, called a bima by eastern Ashkenazi Jews, an almemar or balemer (Yiddish: (ב)אַלעמער, from al-minbar) by Central and Western Ashkenazim, and a teba (תֵּבָה) by Sephardic Jews, where the Torah is read and from where the services are conducted in Sephardi synagogues, can range from an elaborate platform integral to the building (many early modern synagogues of central Europe featured bimahs with pillars that rose to support the ceiling) to elaborate free-standing raised platforms, to simple tables.

A sanctuary lamp, a constantly-lit light as a reminder of the constantly lit temple menorah of the Temple in Jerusalem. Many synagogues, primarily in Ashkenazi communities, feature a pulpit facing the congregation from which the rabbi addresses the assembled. All synagogues require an amud "post, column", a desk facing the Ark from which the hazzan or "cantor" leads the prayers.

A synagogue may or may not have artwork; synagogues range from simple, unadorned prayer rooms to elaborately decorated buildings in every architectural style.

The synagogue, or if it is a multi-purpose building, prayer sanctuaries within the synagogue, are typically designed to have their congregation face towards Jerusalem. Thus, sanctuaries in the Western world generally have their congregation face east, while those east of Jerusalem have their congregation face west. Congregations of sanctuaries in Israel face towards Jerusalem. However, this orientation need not be exact, and occasionally synagogues face other directions for structural reasons; in such cases, the community may face Jerusalem when standing for prayers.

== History ==
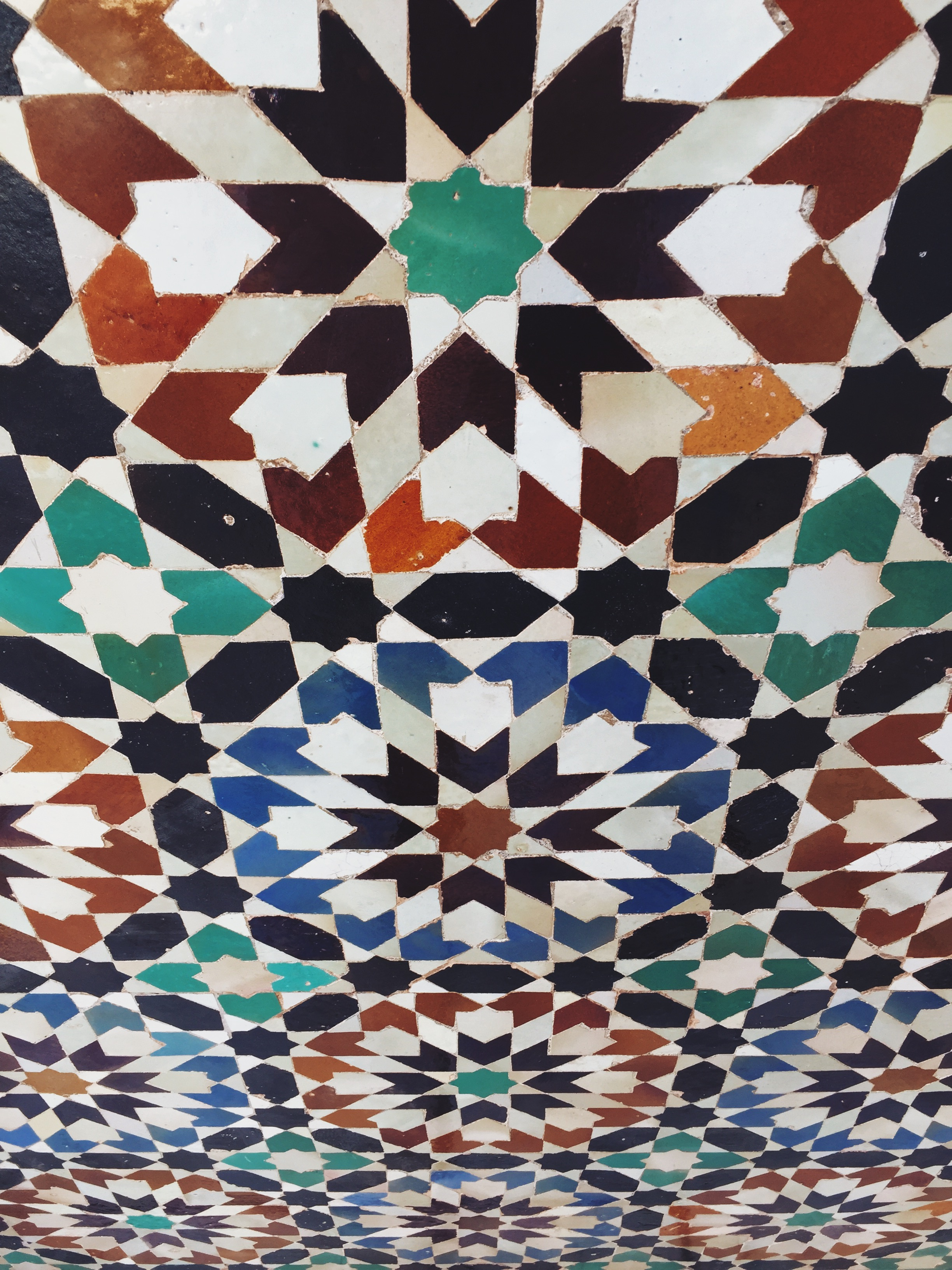
A wall covered in zellīj at the Ben Youssef Madrasa in Marrakesh

The styles of the earliest synagogues resembled the houses of worship of other faiths in the Byzantine Empire, such as the ancient synagogues in Palestine. Later styles continued this practice: synagogues of Morocco are embellished with zellij, colored tilework characteristic of Moroccan architecture. The surviving medieval synagogues in Budapest, Prague, and the German lands are typical of Gothic architecture.

For much of history, the constraints of antisemitism and the laws of host countries restricting the building of synagogues visible from the street or forbidding their construction altogether meant that synagogues were often built within existing structures or opened from interior courtyards. Old synagogues with elaborate interior architecture can be hidden within nondescript European buildings and the Islamic world.

Where synagogues were permitted, they were built in the prevailing architectural style of the time and place. Many European cities had elaborate Renaissance synagogues, of which a few survive. In Italy, numerous synagogues were built in the style of Italian Renaissance architecture, including the Old Synagogue of Livorno, the Padua Synagogue, and the Spanish Synagogue of Venice. With the coming of the Baroque era, Baroque synagogues appeared across Europe.

The Jewish emancipation in Europe and Muslim countries colonized by European countries gave Jews the right to build large, elaborate synagogues visible from the public street. Synagogue architecture blossomed. Large Jewish communities wished to show their wealth and newly acquired status as citizens by constructing magnificent synagogues. Handsome 19th-century synagogues from the period of revival stand in virtually every country with a Jewish community. Most were built in revival styles then in fashion, such as Neoclassical, Neo-Byzantine, Romanesque Revival, Moorish Revival, Gothic Revival, and Greek Revival. There are Egyptian Revival synagogues and even one Mayan Revival synagogue. In the nineteenth and early twentieth century heyday of historicist architecture, however, most historicist synagogues, even the most magnificent ones, did not attempt a pure style, or even any particular style, and are best described as eclectic.

Hasidic Judaism often established their own houses of worship, which are usually known now by the Yiddish loanword shtiebel (שטיבל). These comparatively modest buildings were the focus of Hasidic practice in early modern and pre-war Eastern Europe and afterwards in Israel and North America.

In contrast, the Chabad movement has made a practice of designing Chabad houses as replicas of or homages to the architecture of 770 Eastern Parkway.

=== Central Europe: Polish–Lithuanian Commonwealth ===
Significant exceptions to the rule that synagogues are built in the prevailing style of their time and place are the wooden synagogues in the Polish–Lithuanian Commonwealth and two forms of masonry synagogues: synagogues with bema support and nine-field synagogues (the latter not confined to synagogues).

==== Wooden synagogues ====
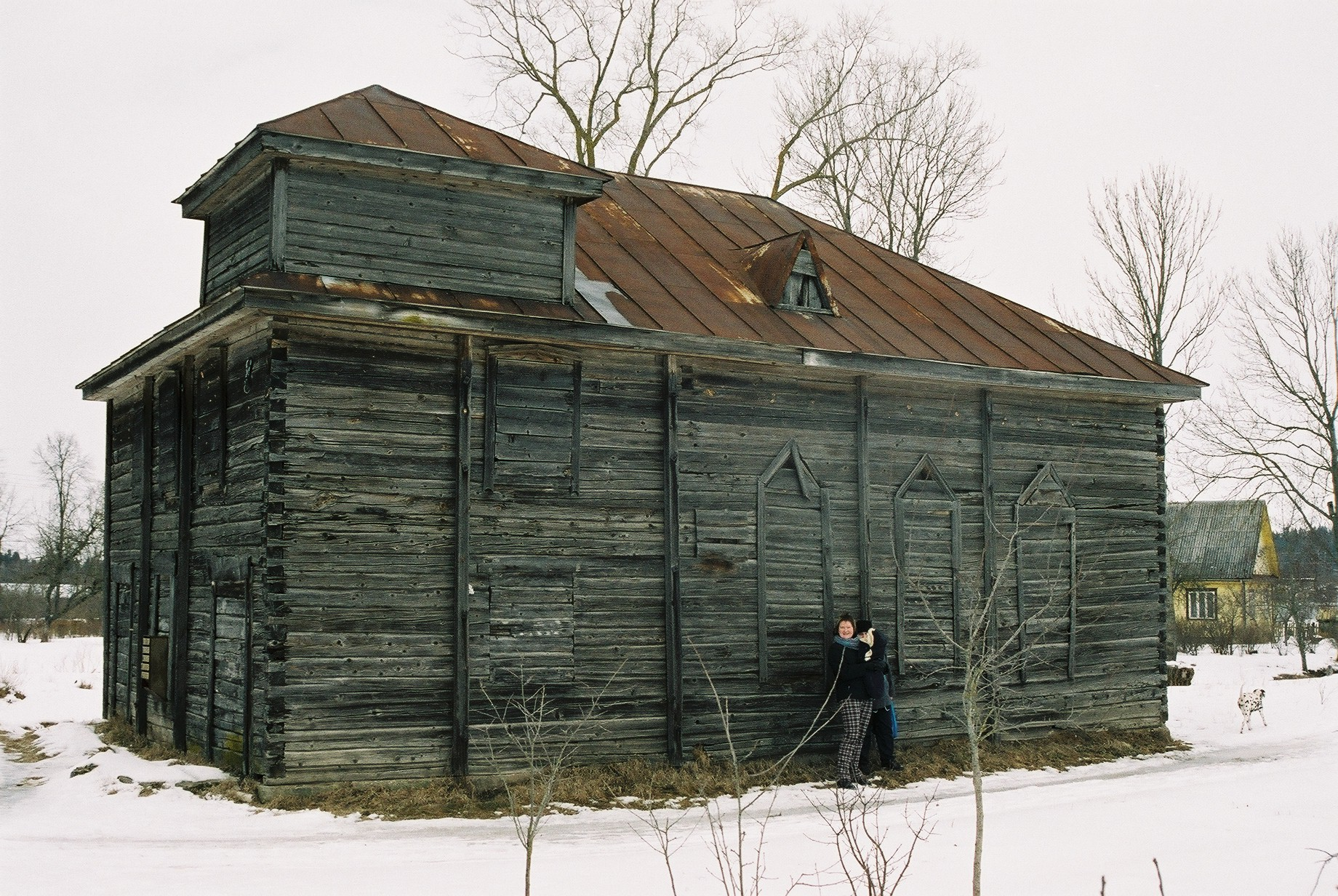
The 1936 Kurkliai Synagogue in Kurkliai

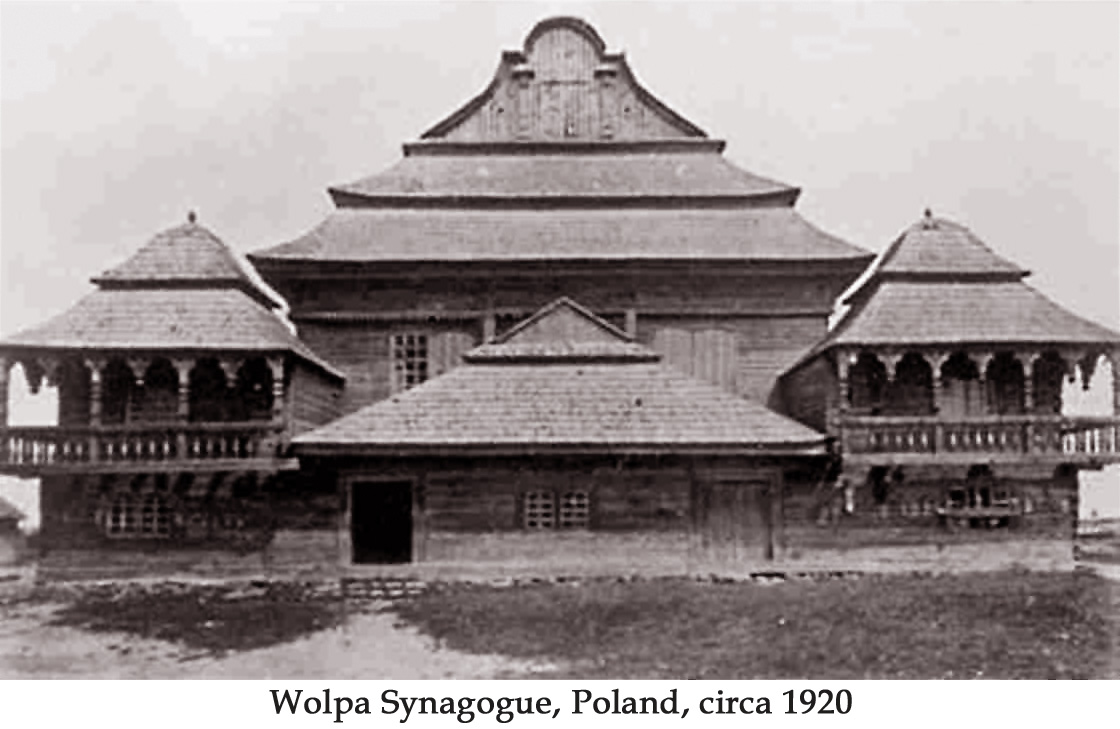
Wołpa Synagogue in Vowpa, Belarus

Wooden synagogues in the Polish–Lithuanian Commonwealth were a unique artistic and architectural form. Characteristic features include the independence of the pitched roof from the design of the interior domed ceiling. They had elaborately carved, painted, domed, balconied and vaulted interiors. The architectural interest of the exterior lay in the buildings' large scale, the multiple, horizontal lines of the tiered roofs, and the carved corbels that supported them. Wooden synagogues featured a single, large hall. In contrast to contemporary churches, there was no apse. Moreover, while contemporary churches featured imposing vestibules, the entry porches of the wooden synagogues were a low annex, usually with a simple lean-to roof. In these synagogues, the emphasis was on constructing a single, large, high-domed worship space.

According to art historian, these wooden synagogues, with their painted and carved interiors, were "a truly original and organic manifestation of artistic expression—the only real Jewish folk art in history."

According to Louis Lozowick, writing in 1947, the wooden synagogues were unique because, unlike all previous synagogues, they were not built in their region's and era's architectural style, but in a newly evolved and uniquely Jewish style, making them "a truly original folk expression," whose "originality does not lie alone in the exterior architecture, it lies equally in the beautiful and intricate wood carving of the interior."

Moreover, while in many parts of the world Jews were proscribed from entering the building trades and even from practicing the decorative arts of painting and woodcarving, the wooden synagogues were built by Jewish craftsmen.

Art historian Ori Z. Soltes points out that the wooden synagogues, unusual for that period in being large, identifiably Jewish buildings not hidden in courtyards or behind walls, were built not only during a Jewish "intellectual golden age" but in a time and place where "the local Jewish population was equal to or even greater than the Christian population.

==== Synagogues with bimah-support ====
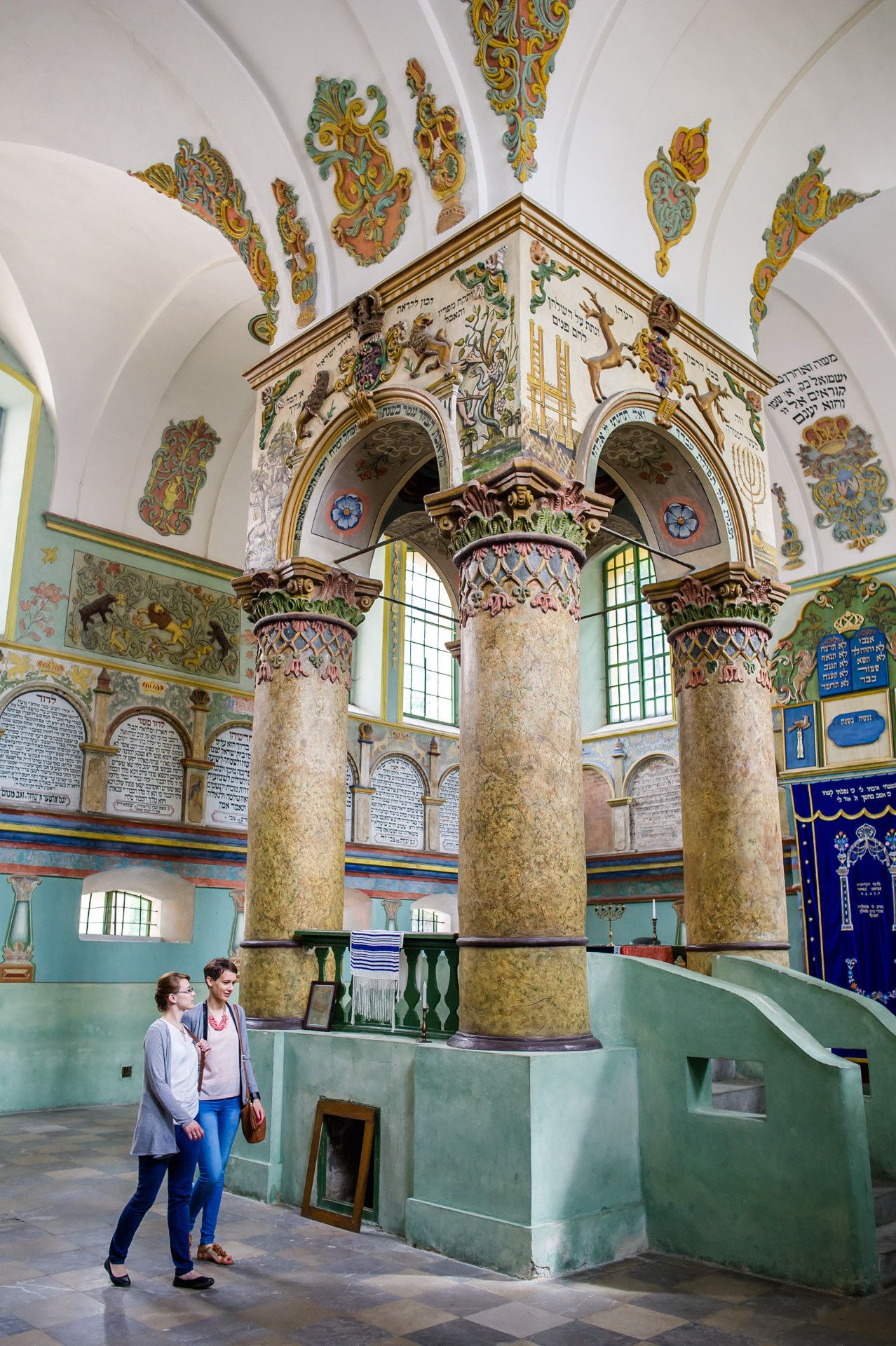
Łańcut Synagogue, bimah-tower

In the second half of the 16th century, masonry synagogues whose interiors present an original structural solution, found in no other kind of building, were constructed in the Polish–Lithuanian Commonwealth. These were synagogue halls whose bimah was surrounded by four pillars. Placed upon a podium, connected above by arcading, in one powerful pier, the pillars constituted the bimah-support or bimah-tower supporting the vault, consisting of four barrels with lunettes intersecting at the corners. The bases of the vault-rips rested on the podium or were transmitted through a balustrade, solid or pierced. A small cupola covered the field above the bimah. These cupolas were occasionally significantly lower in comparison with the remaining fields of vaulting. Thus, a kind of inner chapel, built inside the bimah-tower, was created.

One of the first synagogues with a bimah-support was the Old Synagogue of Przemyśl, which was destroyed during World War II. Synagogues with a bimah-tower were built up to the 19th century and the concept was adopted in various Central European countries.

==== Nine-field synagogues ====
Around the beginning of the 1630s, the first synagogues with nine-field vaulting were constructed. This design has a set of four large columns or piers placed squarely in a rectangular central space, supporting three rows of three vaults on the ceiling. They allowed for much greater halls than hitherto and were also called nine-bay synagogues. The Great Suburb Synagogue in Lviv and the synagogue in Ostroh were erected virtually at the same time (1625 and 1627). In these halls the vaulting rested on four tall pillars and on corresponding wall pilasters. The columns and the pilasters were situated in equal spacing and dividing the roof-area into nine equal fields. In these synagogues the bimah was a free-standing podium or a bower situated within the central field between the pillars.

=== Egyptian Revival ===
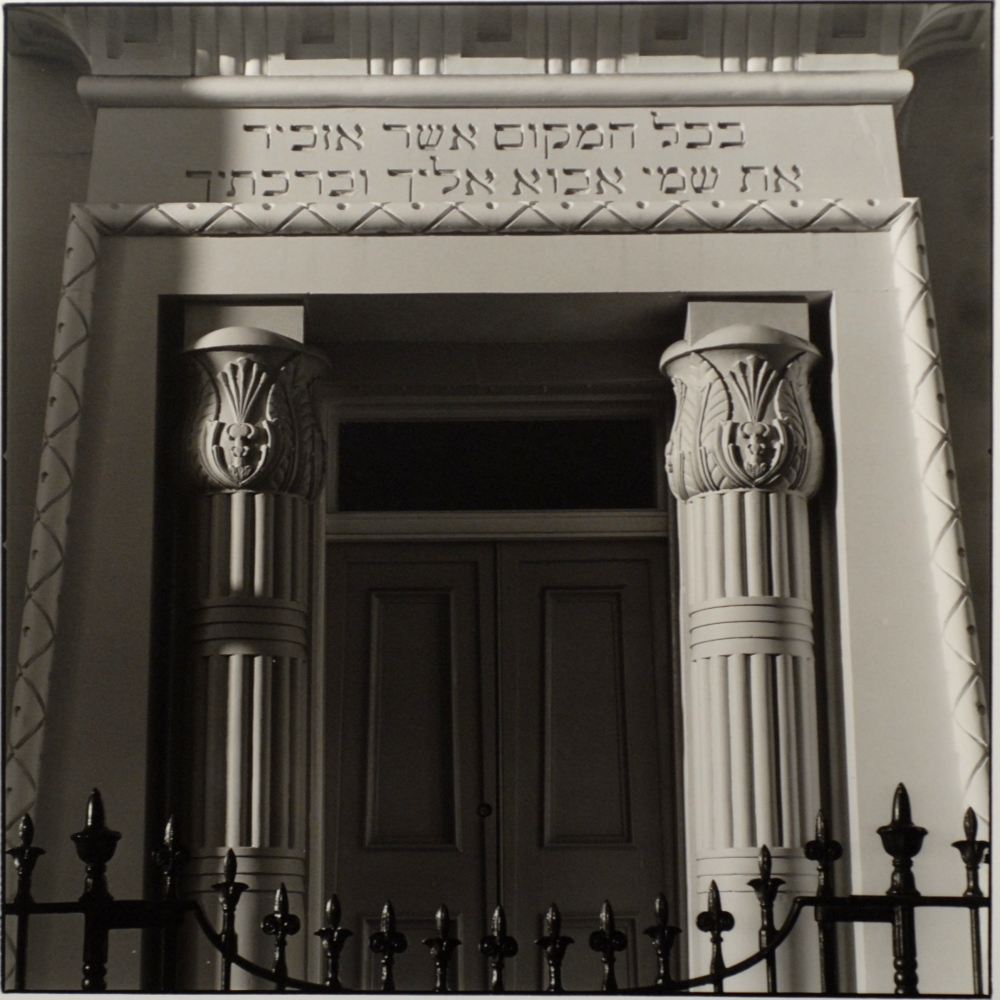
Egyptian door, Hobart Synagogue

Egyptian Revival synagogues were popular in the early nineteenth century. Rachel Wischnitzer argues that they were part of the fashion for Egyptian style inspired by the Napoleonic Wars. According to Carol Herselle Krinsky, they were meant as imitations of Solomon's Temple and intended by architects and governments to insult Jews by portraying Judaism as a foreign faith. According to Diana Muir Appelbaum, they were expressions of Jewish identity intended to advertise Jewish origins in ancient Israel.

=== Moorish influence ===
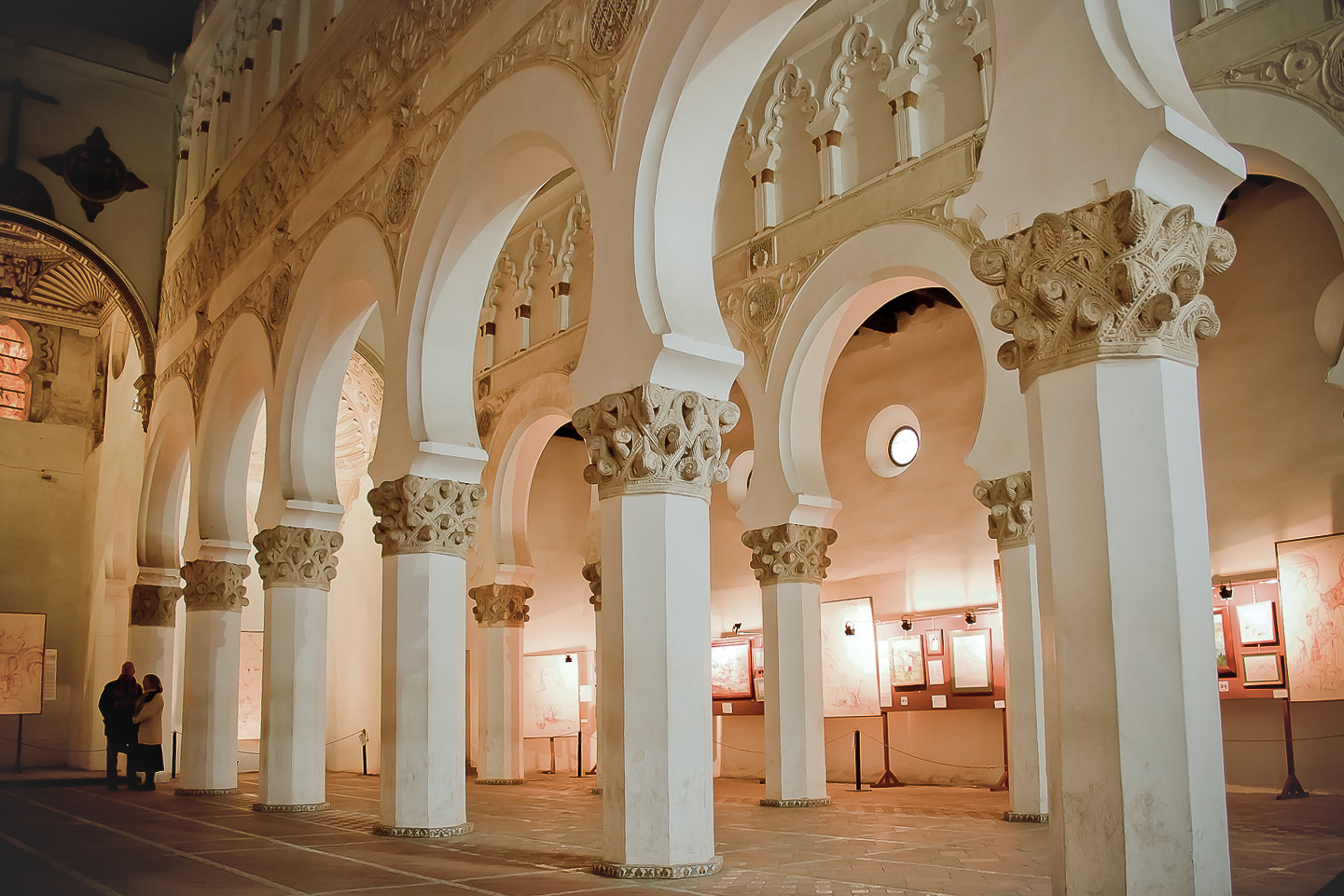
Interior of Santa María la Blanca

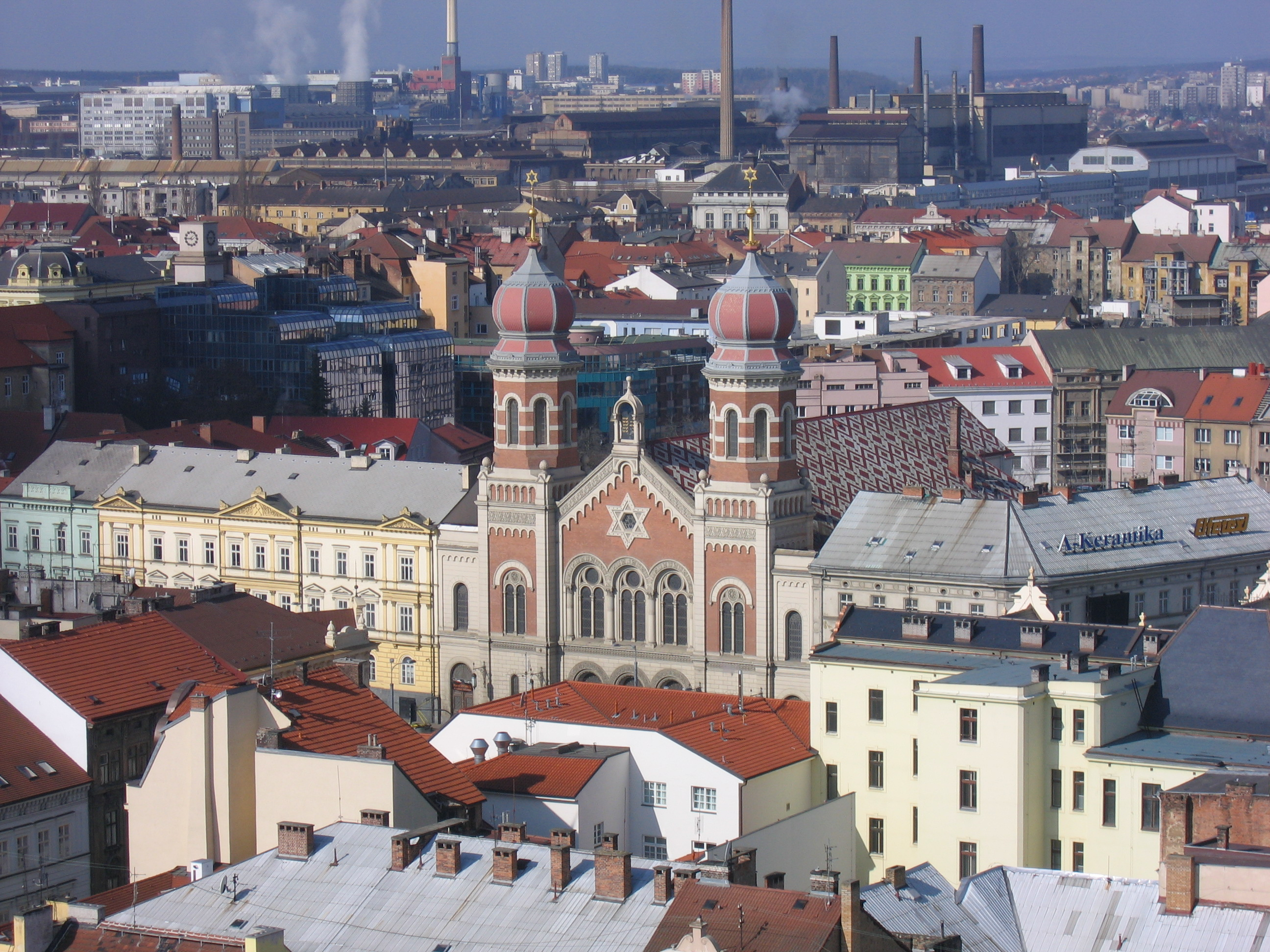
Great Synagogue of Plzeň in Plzeň, Czech Republic

In medieval Spain (both Al-Andalus and the Christian kingdoms), a host of synagogues were built, and it was usual to commission them from Moorish and later Mudéjar architects. Very few of these medieval synagogues, built with Moorish techniques and style, are conserved. The two best-known Spanish synagogues are in Toledo, one known as el Tránsito, the other as Santa María la Blanca, and are now preserved as national monuments. The former is a small building containing very rich decorations; the latter is especially noteworthy. It is based on the Almohad style and features long rows of octagonal columns with curiously carved capitals, from which Moorish arches spring, supporting the roof.

Another significant Mudéjar synagogue is the one at Córdoba built in 1315. As in el Tránsito, the vegetal and geometrical stucco decorations are purely Moorish, but unlike the former, the epigraphic texts are in Hebrew.

After the Expulsion of Jews from Spain and Portugal, there was a general feeling among wealthy Sephardim that Moorish architecture was appropriate in synagogues. By the mid-19th century, the style was adopted by the Ashkenazim of Central and Eastern Europe, who associated Moorish and Mudéjar architectural forms with the Golden Age of Jewish culture in Spain. As a consequence, Moorish Revival spread around the globe as a preferred style of synagogue architecture, although Moorish architecture is by no means Jewish, either in fact or in feeling. The Alhambra has furnished inspiration for innumerable synagogues, but seldom have its graceful proportions or its delicate modeling and elaborate ornamentation been successfully copied.

Moorish style, when adapted by the Ashkenazim, was believed to have been a reference to the Golden Age of Spanish Jewry, it was not the primary intention of the Jews and architects who chose to build in the Moorish style. Rather, the choice to use the Moorish style was reflective of pride in their heritage. This pride in their heritage and understanding of Jews as "Semitic peoples" or as "oriental" led architects like Gottfried Semper (Semper Synagogue Dresden, Germany) and Ludwig Förster (Tempelgasse or Leopoldstädter Tempel, Vienna, Austria and Dohány Street Synagogue, Budapest, Hungary) to build their synagogues in the Moorish style. Moorish Style remained a popular choice for synagogues throughout the rest of the 19th and early 20th century.

=== Modern synagogue architecture ===
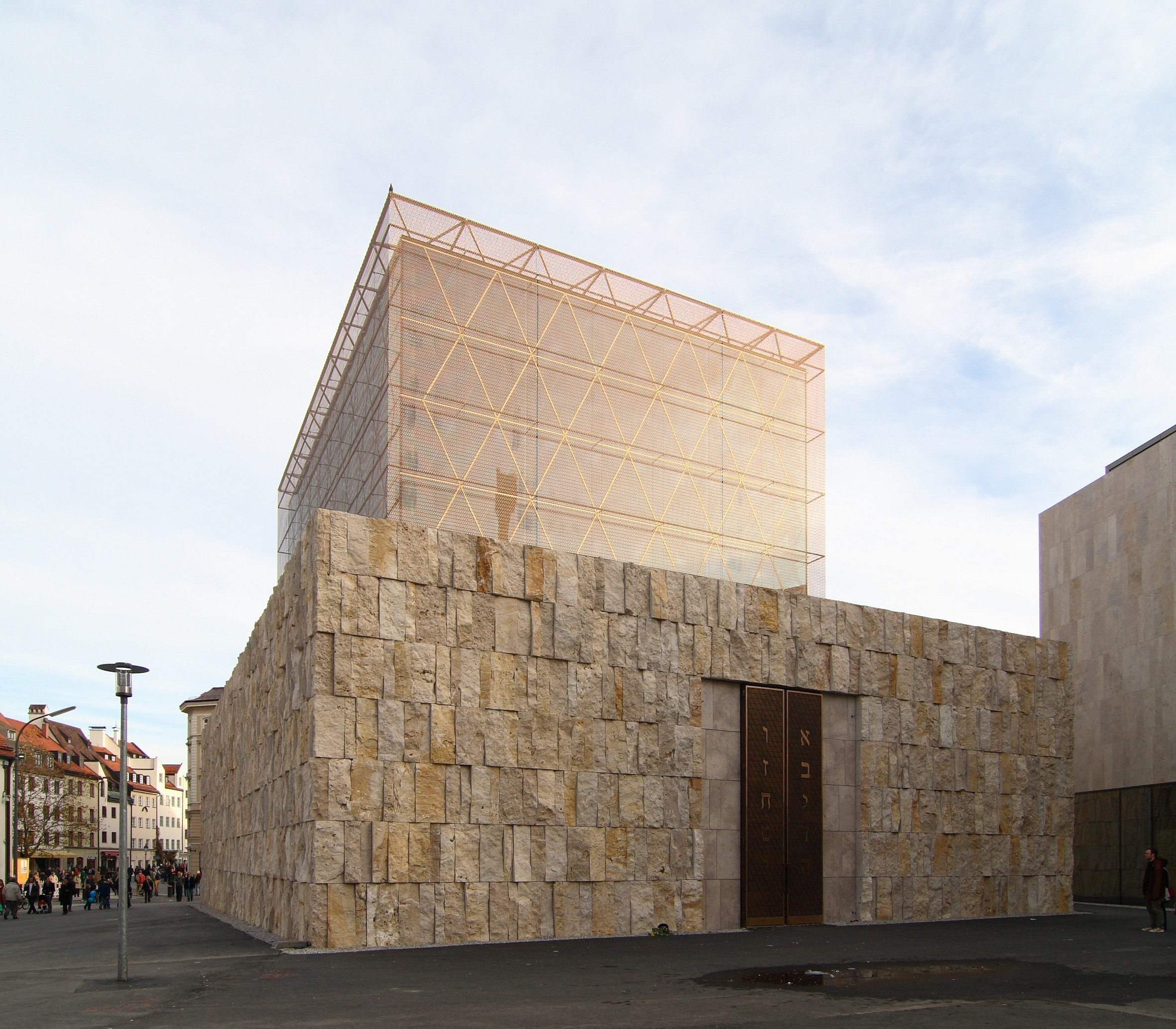
Ohel Jakob synagogue in Munich, Germany

In the modern period, synagogues have continued to be built in every popular architectural style, including Art Nouveau, Art Deco, International style, and all contemporary styles. In the post-World War II period "a period of post-war modernism," came to the fore, "characterized by assertive architectural gestures that had the strength and integrity to stand alone, without applied artwork or Jewish iconography." A notable work of Art Nouveau, pre–World War I Hungarian synagogue architecture is Budapest's Kazinczy Street Synagogue.

In the UK, synagogues built in the early 1960s, such as a Carmel College, Oxfordshire, designed by the British architect Thomas Hancock, were decorated with the stained glass of windows of Israeli artist, Nehemia Azaz. The stained glass windows were praised by art and architecture scholar Nikolaus Pevsner as using "extraordinary technique with rough pieces of coloured glass like crystals" and by Historic England as "brilliant and innovative artistic glass".

== The interior ==
The most common general plan for the interior of the synagogue features an ark positioned opposite the entrance, accompanied by a bima or pulpit. In older or Orthodox synagogues with separate seating, there may be benches for the men on either side, and a women's gallery reached by staircases from the outer vestibule. Variations of this simple plan abound: the vestibule became larger, and the staircases to the women's gallery were separated from the vestibule and given more importance. As the buildings became larger, rows of columns were required to support the roof, but in every case, the basilican form was retained. The ark, formerly allowed a mere niche in the wall, was developed into the main architectural feature of the interior and was flanked by columns, covered with a canopy, and richly decorated. The almemar in many cases was joined to the platform in front of the Ark, and elaborate arrangements of steps were provided.

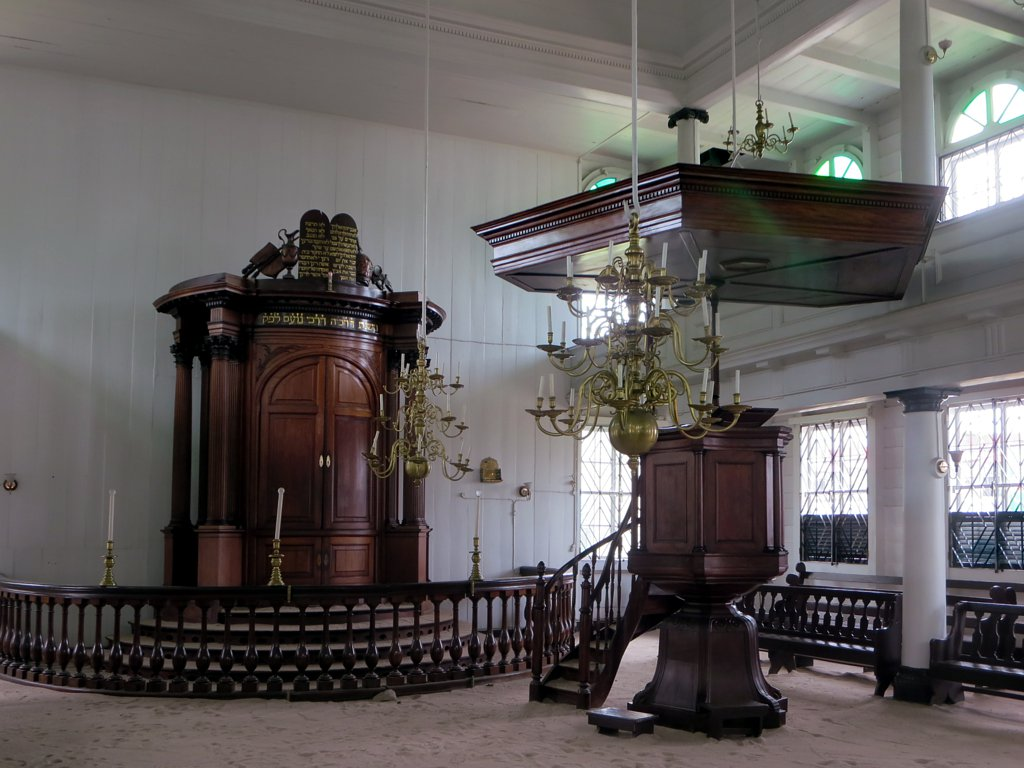
Neveh Shalom Synagogue (1842) in Paramaribo, Suriname

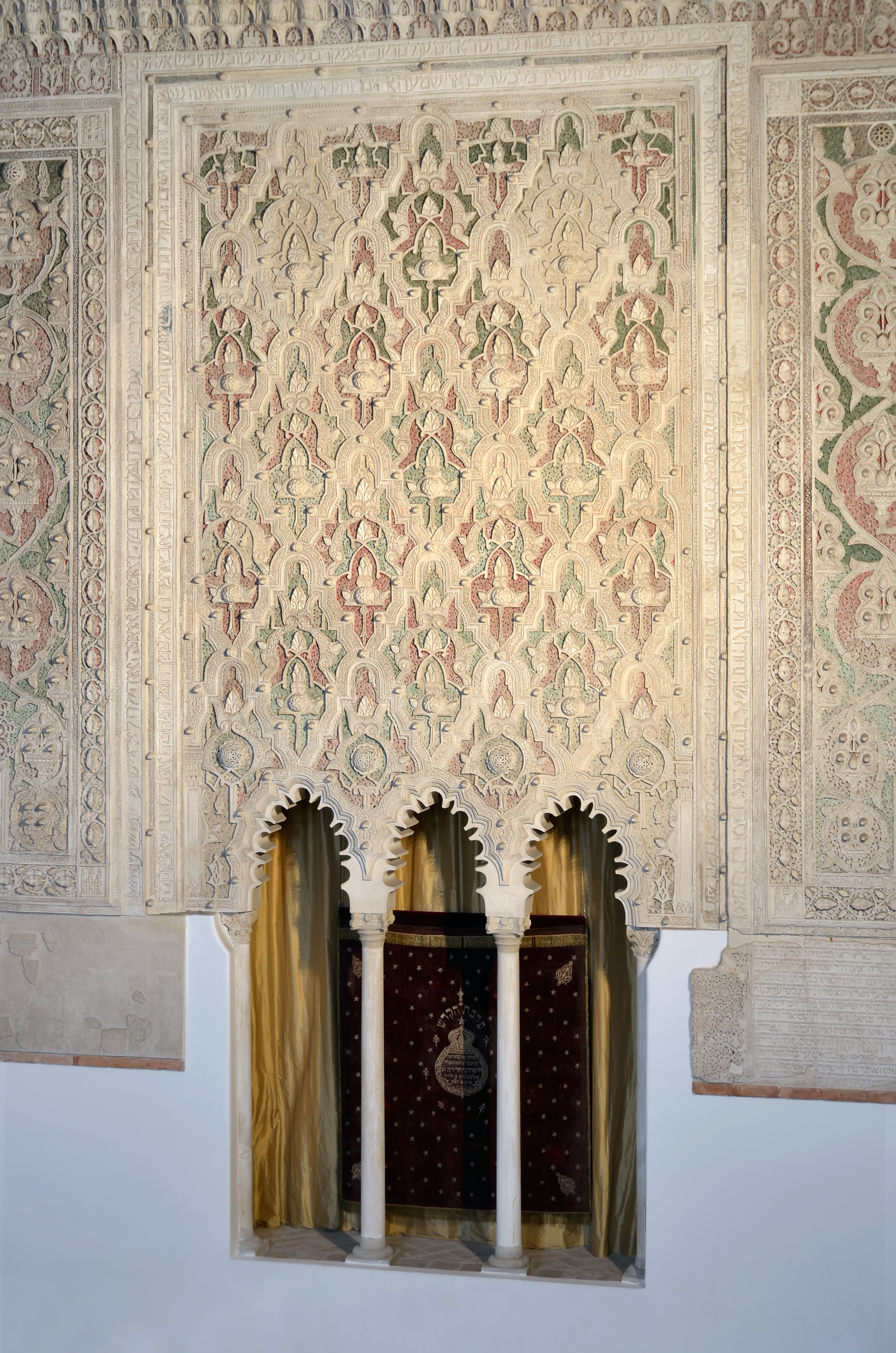
Ark of the 14th-century Synagogue of El Tránsito in Toledo, Spain

=== The Ark ===
The Torah Ark is the most important feature of the interior and is generally distinguished by proper decoration, raised upon a suitable platform, and reached by at least three steps, but often by more. It is usually crowned by the Ten Commandments and the Torah. The position of the pulpit varies; it may be placed on either side of the Ark and is occasionally found in the center of the steps.

=== Other interior arrangements ===
The modern synagogue, besides containing the minister's study, trustees' rooms, choir rooms, and organ loft, devotes much space to school purposes; generally, the entire lower floor is used for classrooms. The interior design of the synagogue allows for great latitude.

For the thirty-three synagogues in India, American architect and professor of architecture Jay A. Waronker states that these buildings tend to follow the Sephardic traditions of a freestanding teba (lectern) roughly in the middle of the sanctuary and the ark along the wall that is closest to Jerusalem. The hekhals are essentially cabinets or armoires storing the Torah scrolls. Seating, in the form of long wooden benches, is grouped around and facing the tevah. Men sit together on the main level of the sanctuary while women sit in a dedicated zone on the same level in the smaller synagogues or upstairs in a women's gallery.

Interesting architectural and planning exceptions to this common Sephardic formula are the Cochin synagogues in Kerala, located in far southwestern India. Here, on the gallery level and adjacent to the space provided for women and overlooking the sanctuary below, is a second tevah. This tevah was used for holidays and unique occasions. It is therefore interesting that on more special events, the women are closest to the point where the religious service is being led.

In Baghdadi Jewish synagogues of India, the arks are standard-sized cabinets from the outside, the side facing the sanctuary, but when opened, a very large space is revealed. They are essentially walk-in rooms with a perimeter shelf holding up to a hundred Torah scrolls.

=== Interior decoration ===
There are only a few emblems that may be used: the Star of David, the lion of Judah, and flower and fruit forms alone are generally allowable in Orthodox synagogues. The sanctuary lamp hangs in front of the Ark; the tables of the Law surmount it. The temple menorah may be placed on either side. Occasionally, a shofar or even a lulav, may be utilized in the design. Hebrew inscriptions are sparingly or seldom used; stained-glass windows, at one time considered the special property of church building, are now employed, but figural art is not used.

== Gallery ==
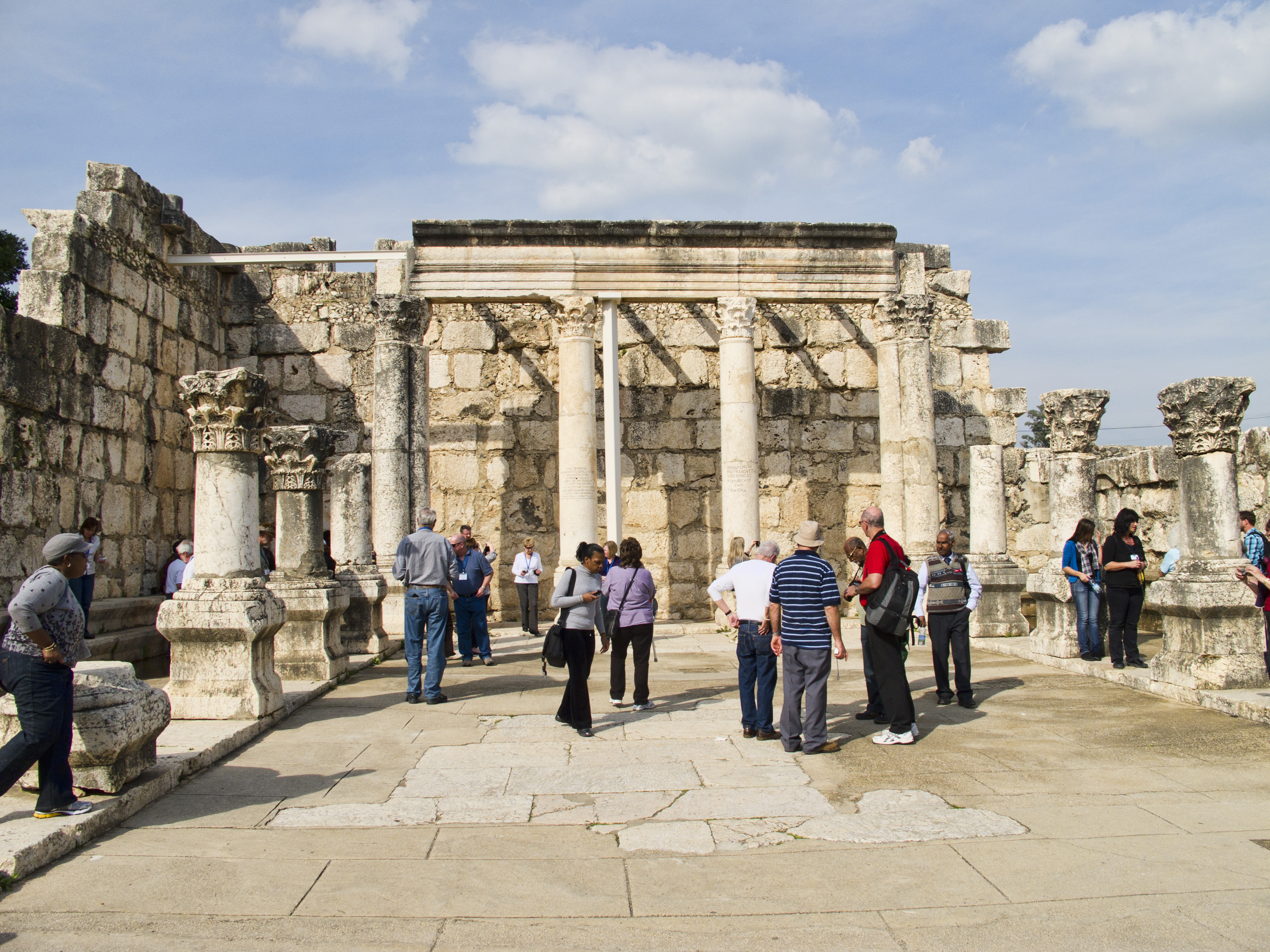
4th century synagogue in Capernaum, Israel

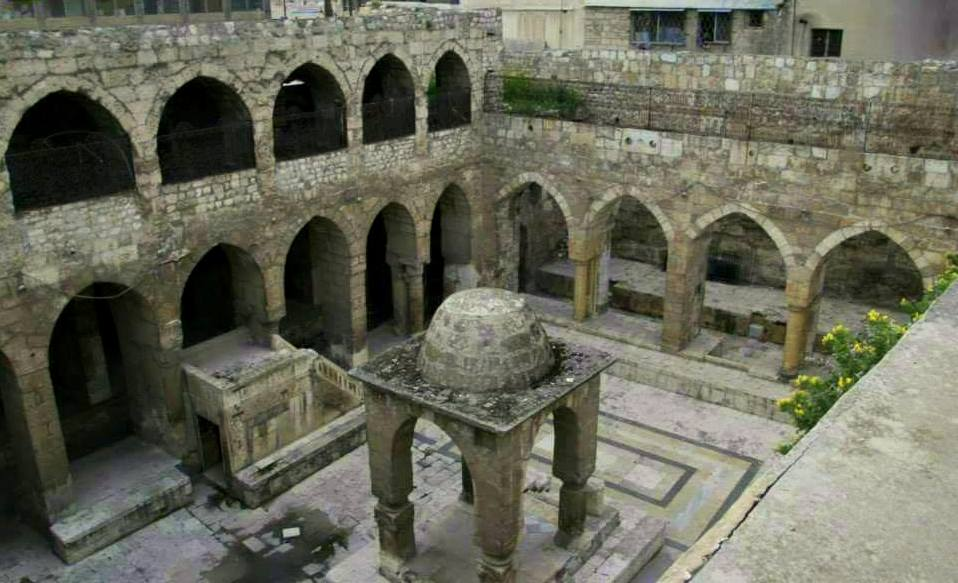
The Central Synagogue of Aleppo. The oldest surviving inscription at the site dates to 834 CE.

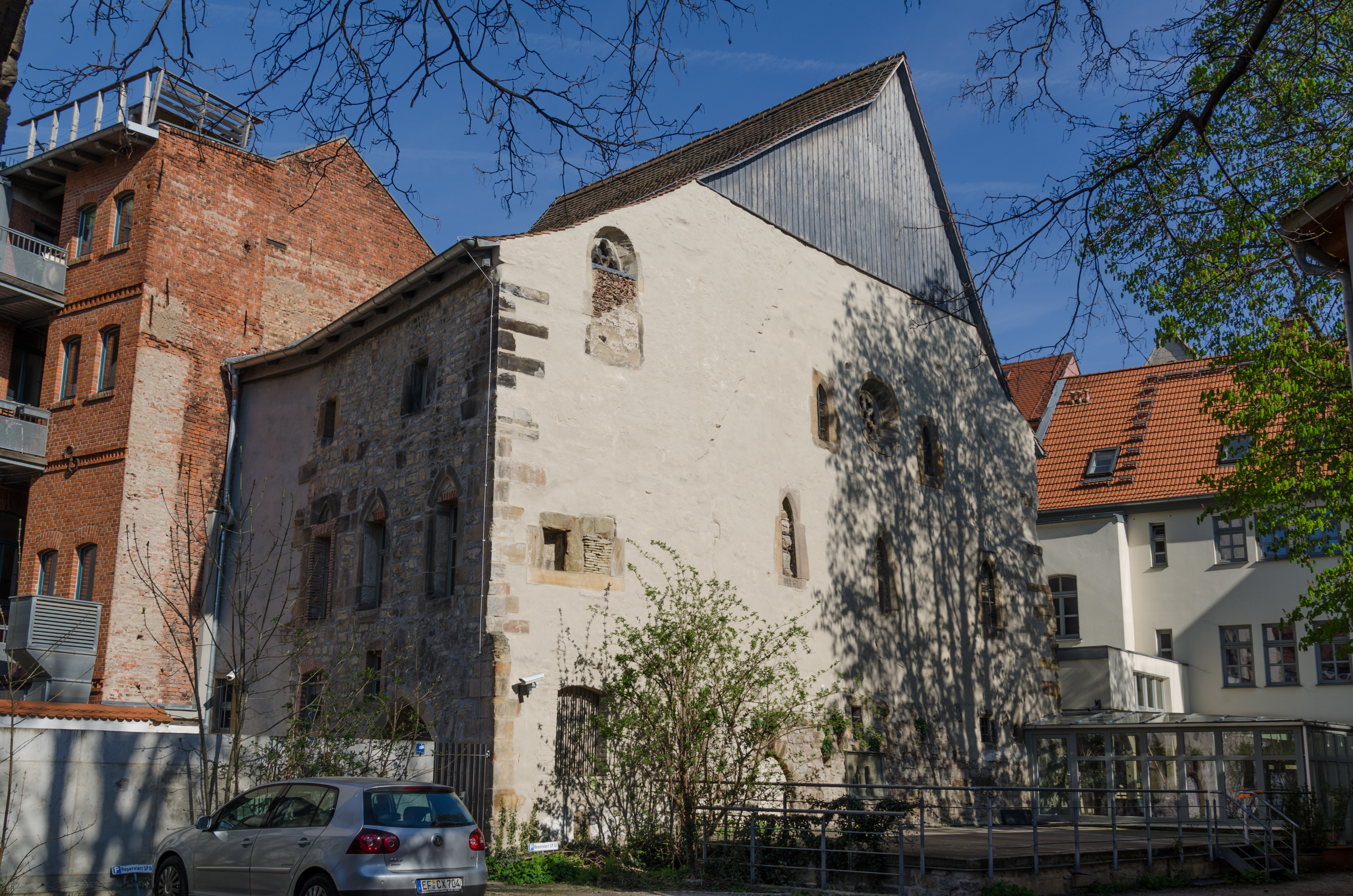
The oldest parts of the Old Synagogue in Erfurt, Germany date to the late 11th century

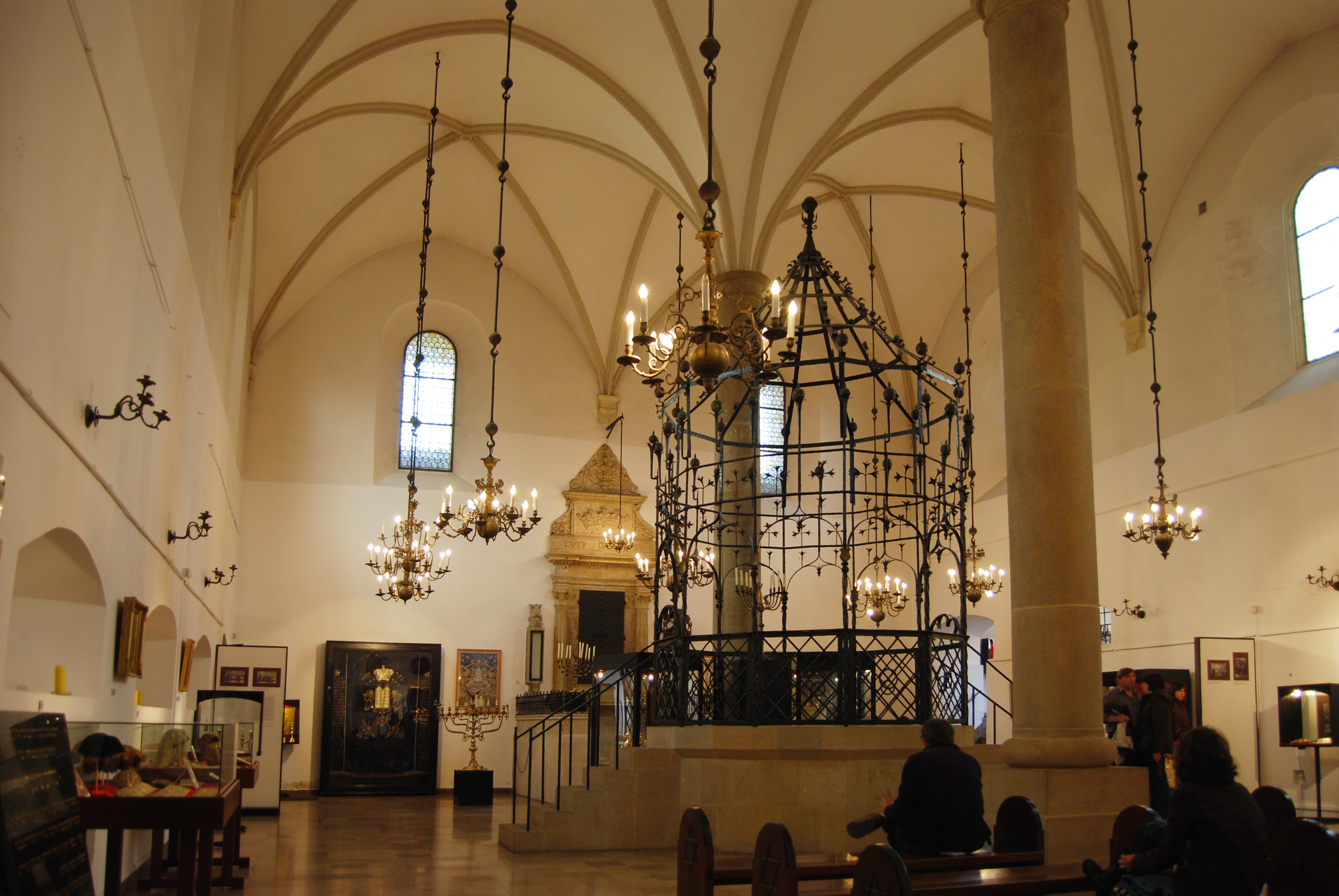
The 15th century Old Synagogue in Kraków, Poland

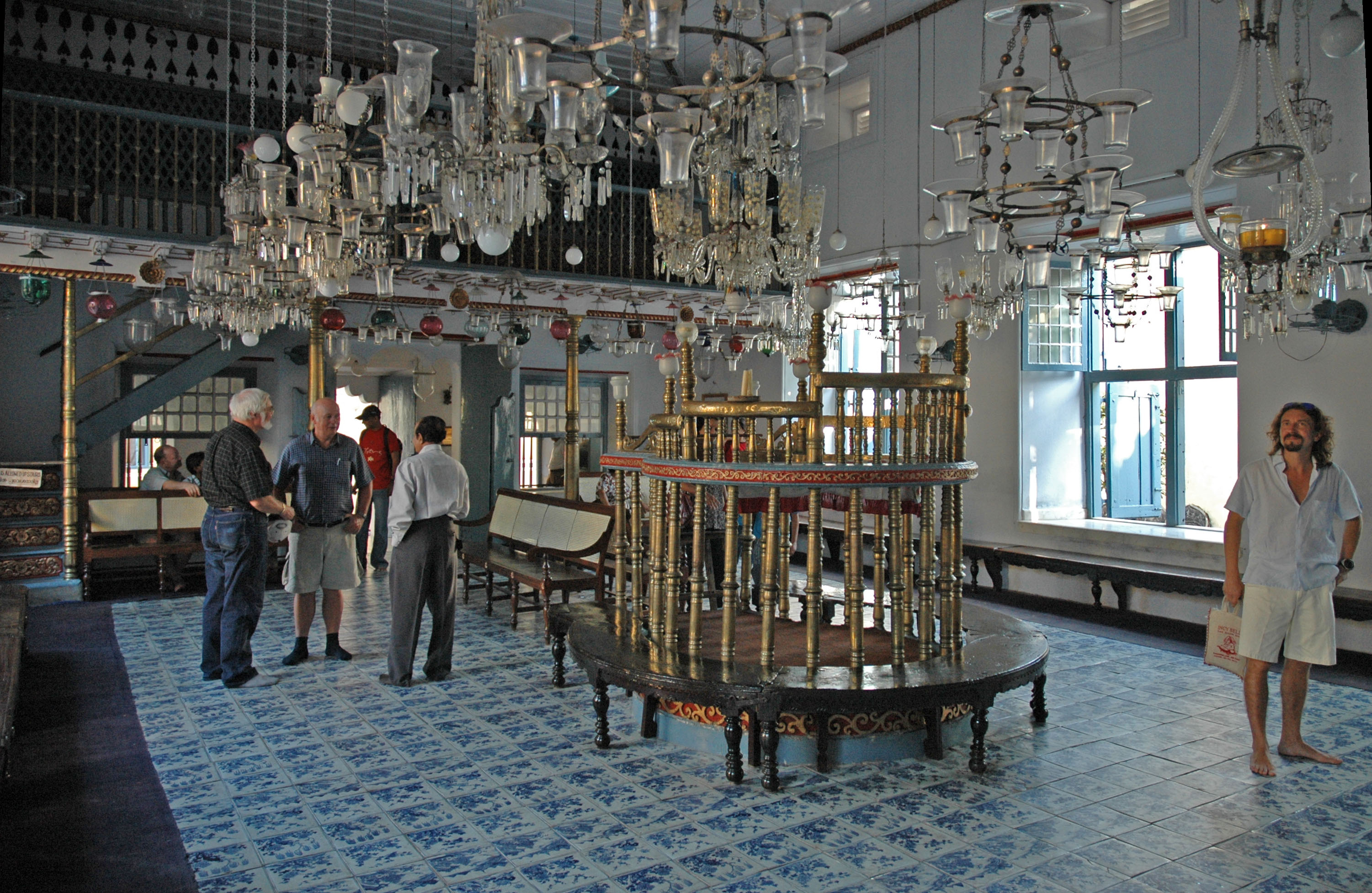
Cochin Paradesi Synagogue (1568) in Kochi, India

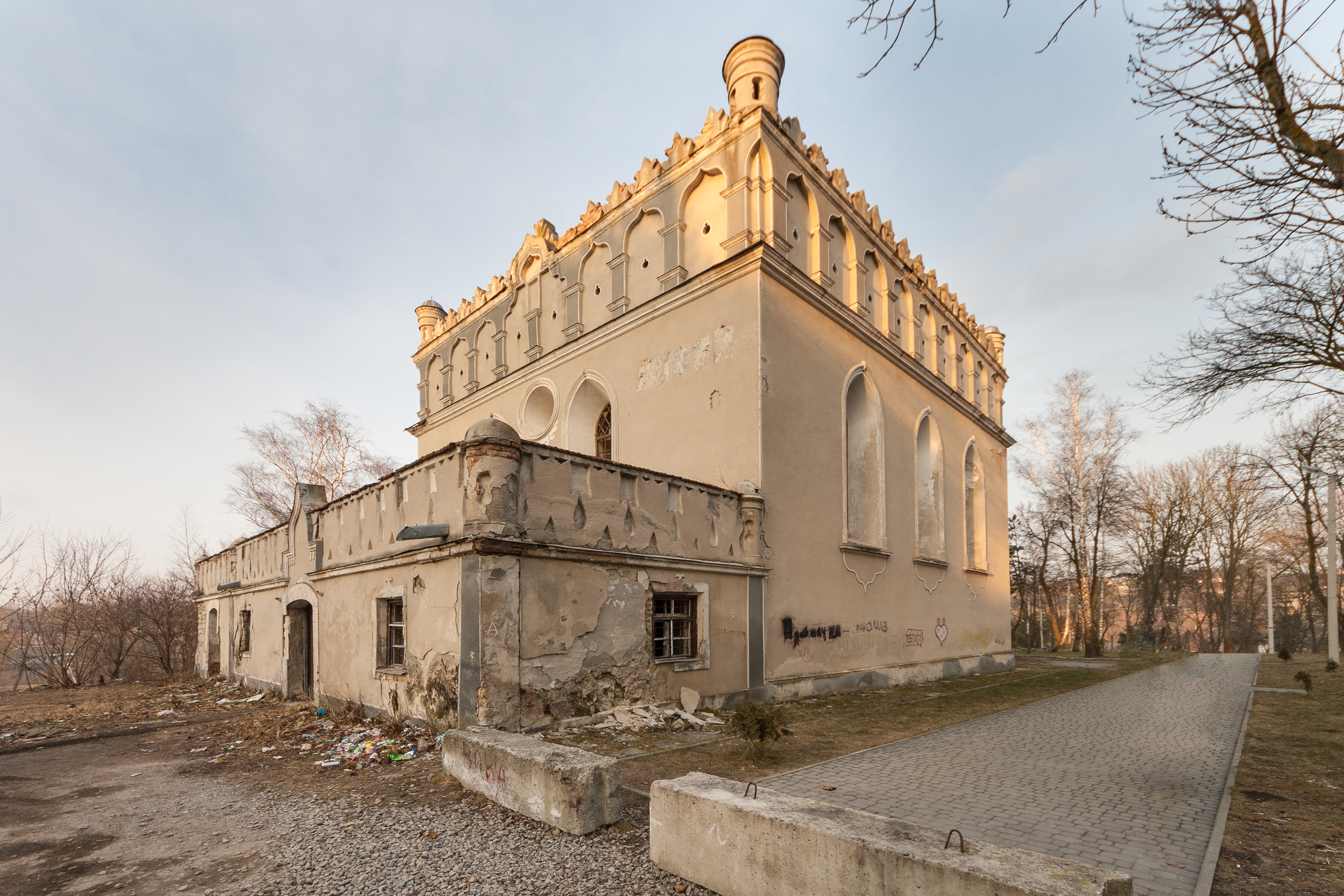
The 17th century Husiatyn Synagogue in Husiatyn, Ukraine

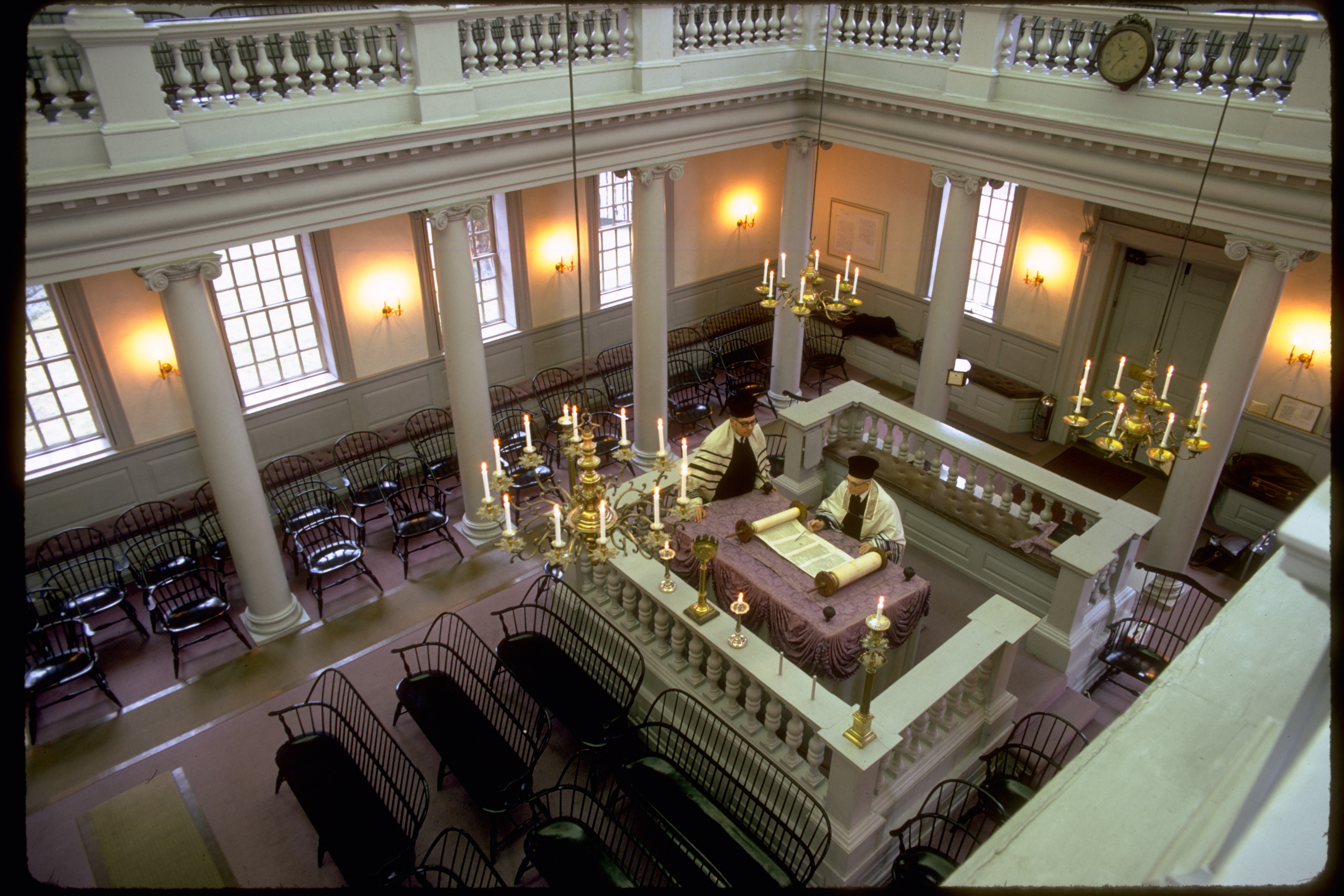
The Touro Synagogue (1759) in Newport, Rhode Island is the oldest synagogue in the United States

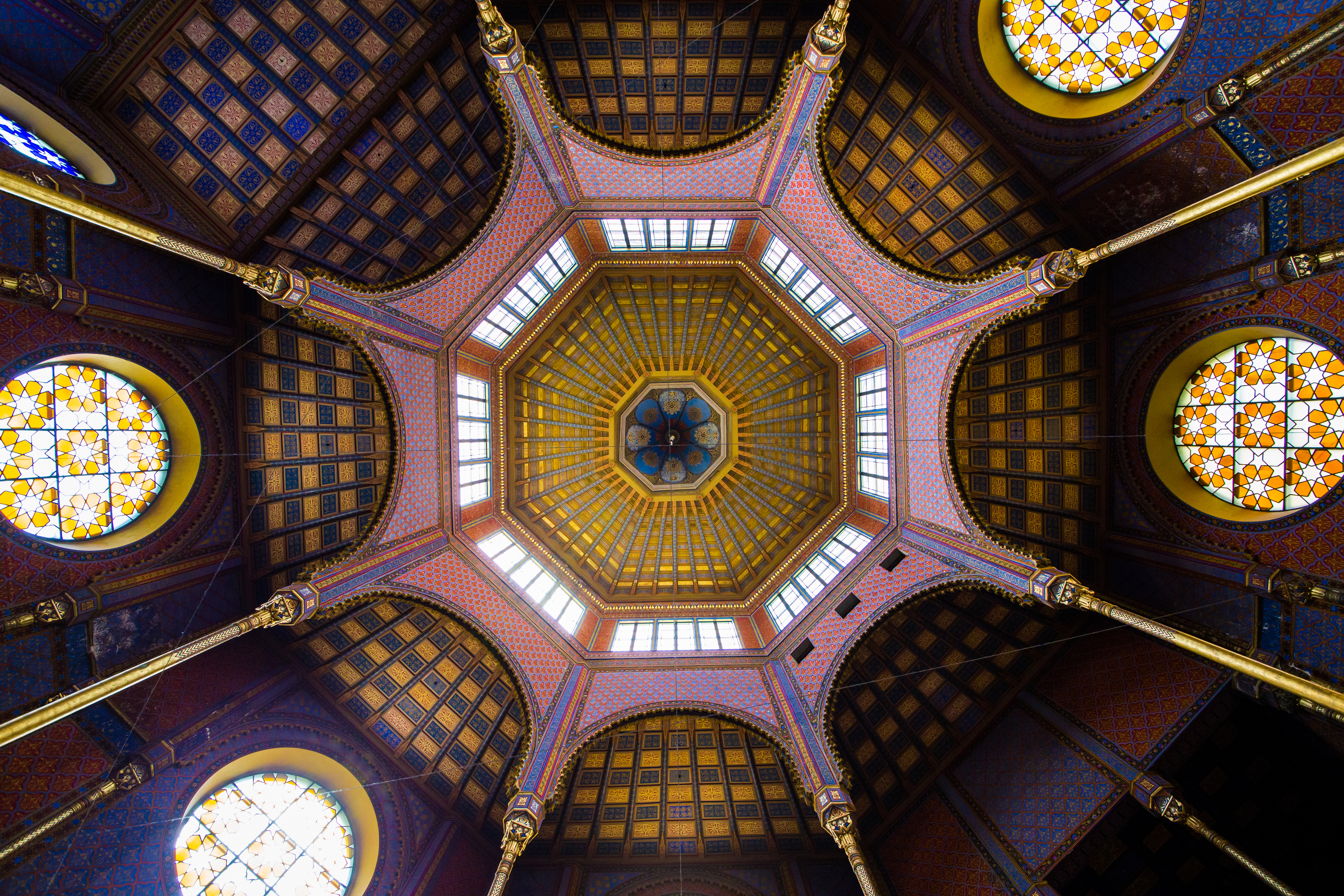
The 1869 Rumbach Street Synagogue in Budapest, Hungary

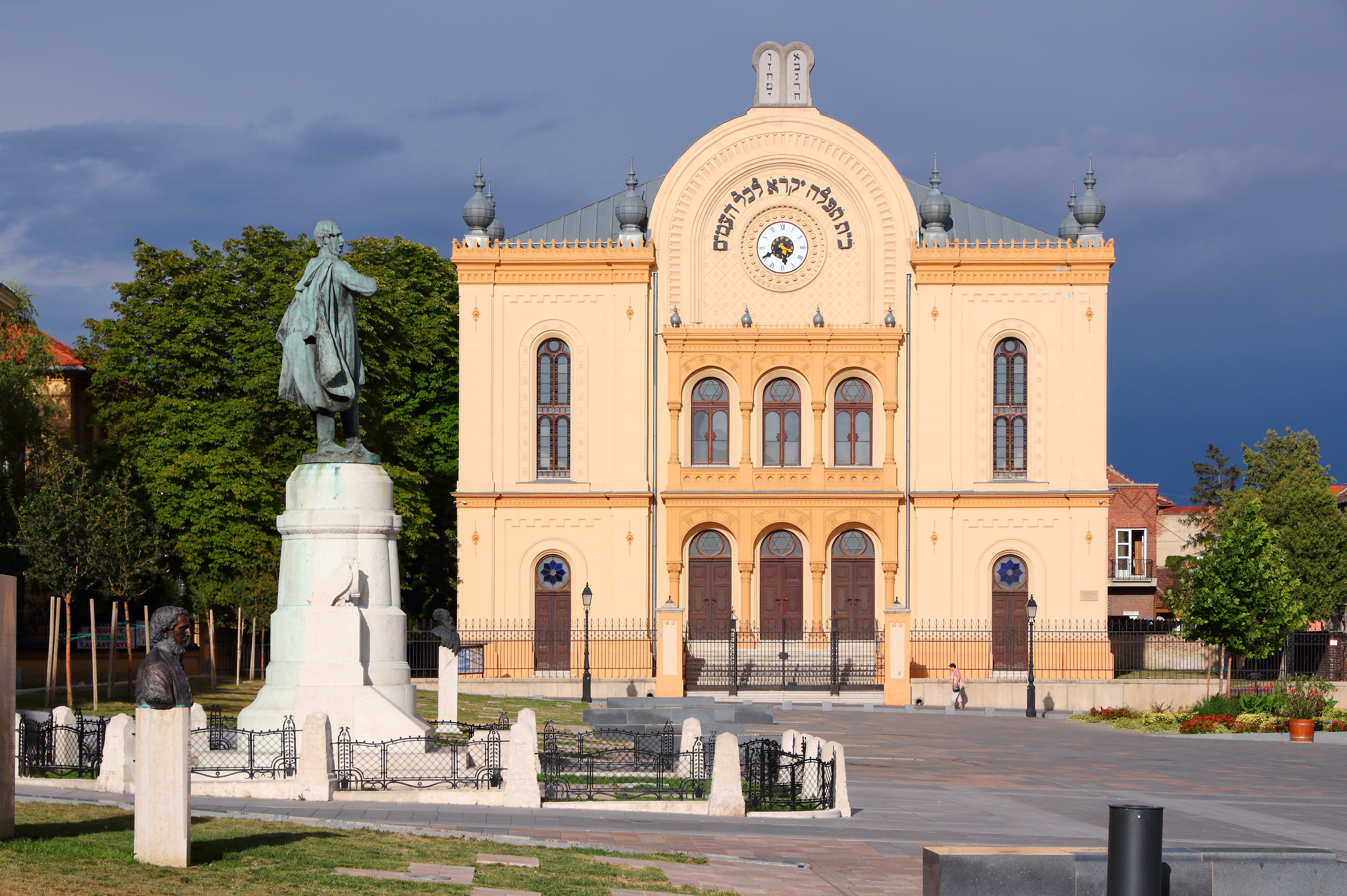
1869 Great Synagogue in Romantic style in Pécs, Hungary

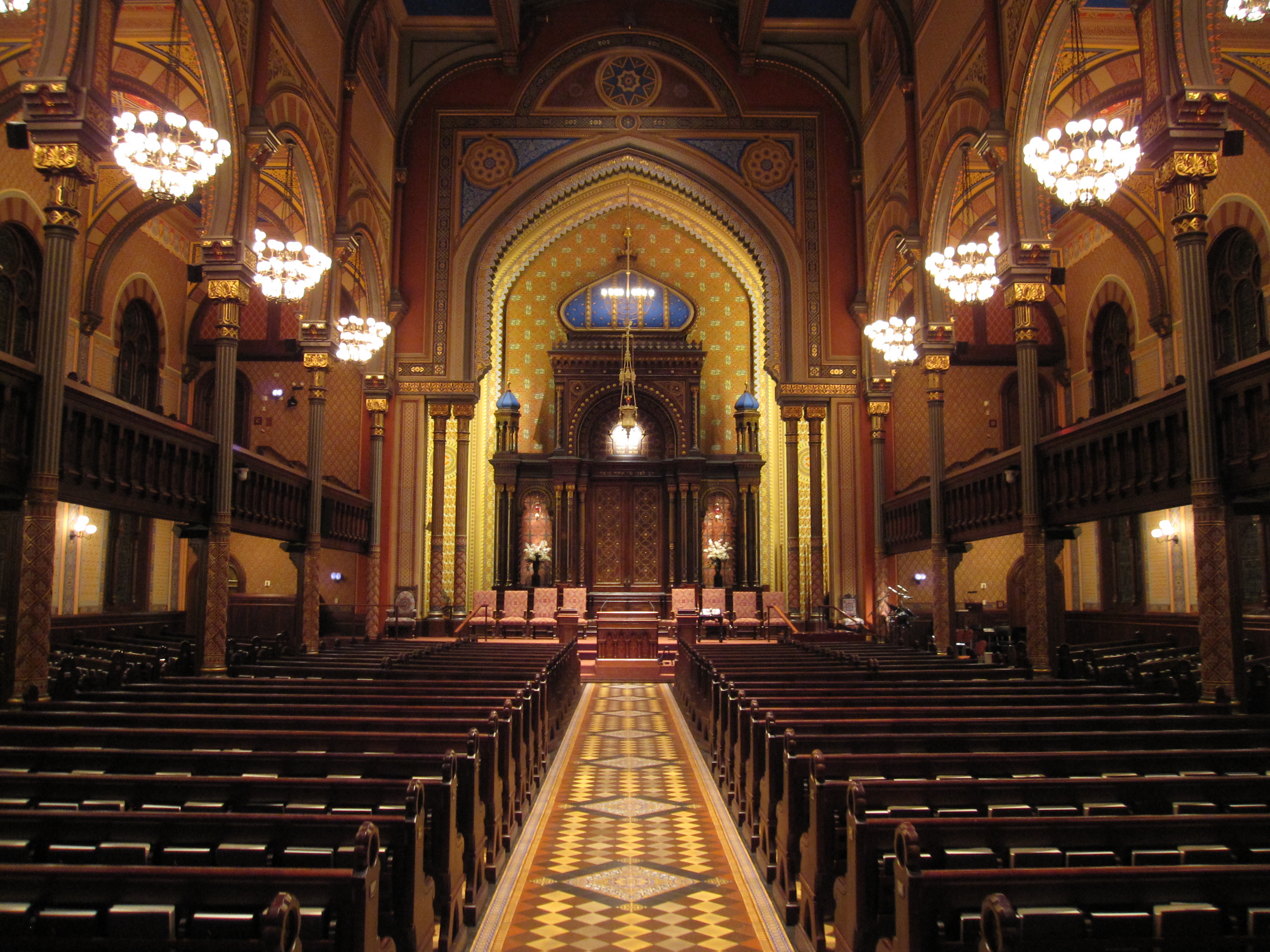
Interior of the Moorish Revival Central Synagogue (1872) by Henry Fernbach in Manhattan, New York

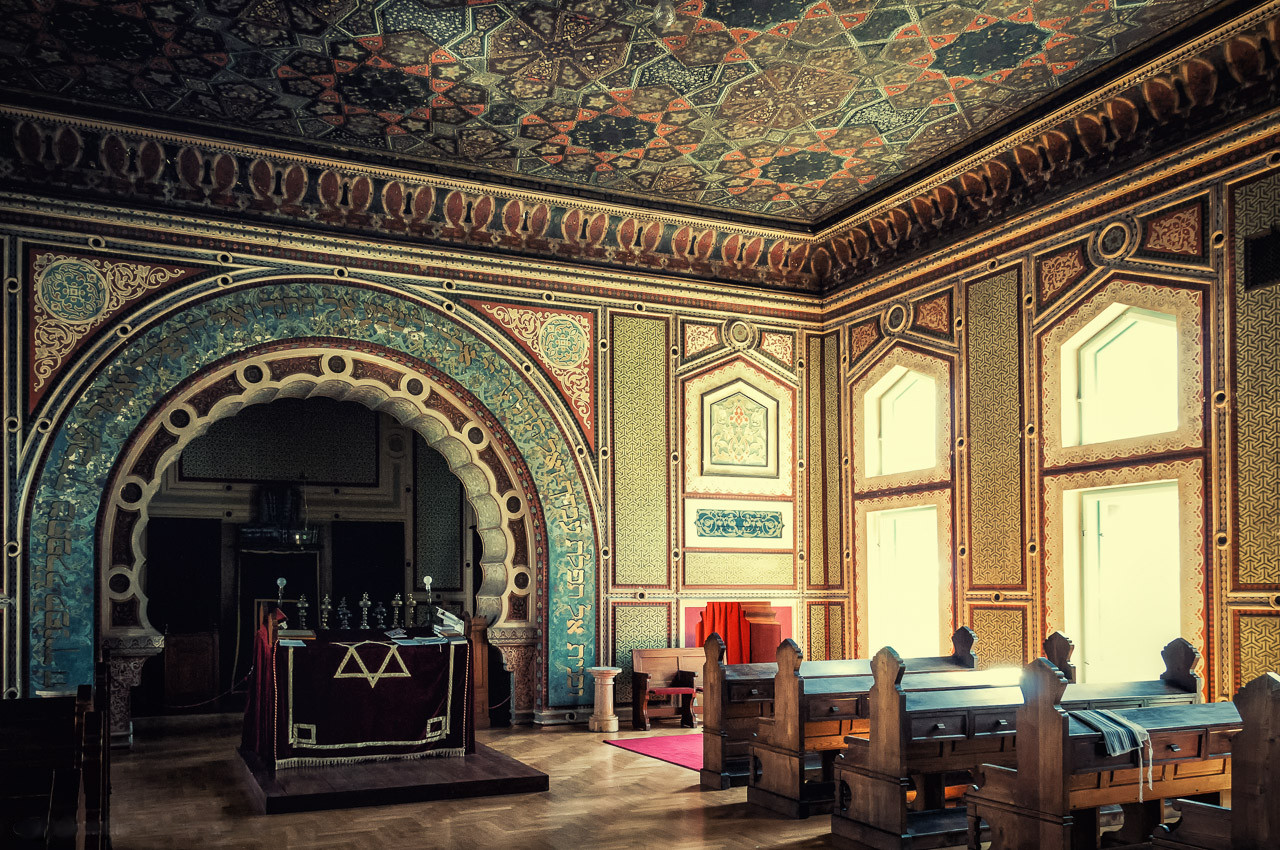
1902 Sarajevo Synagogue in Sarajevo, Bosnia and Herzegovina

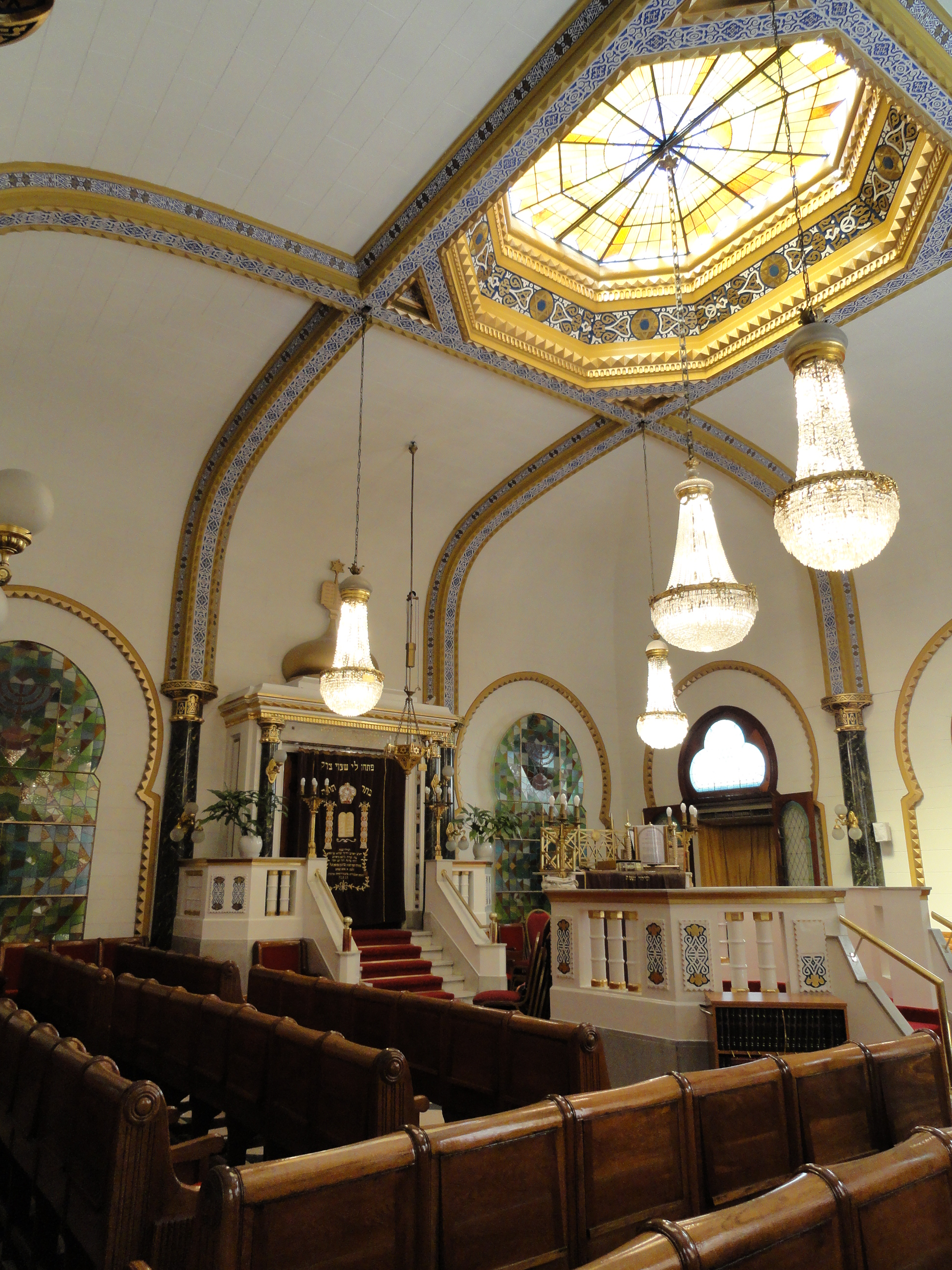
Sinagoga Or Torah (1927) of Buenos Aires, Argentina

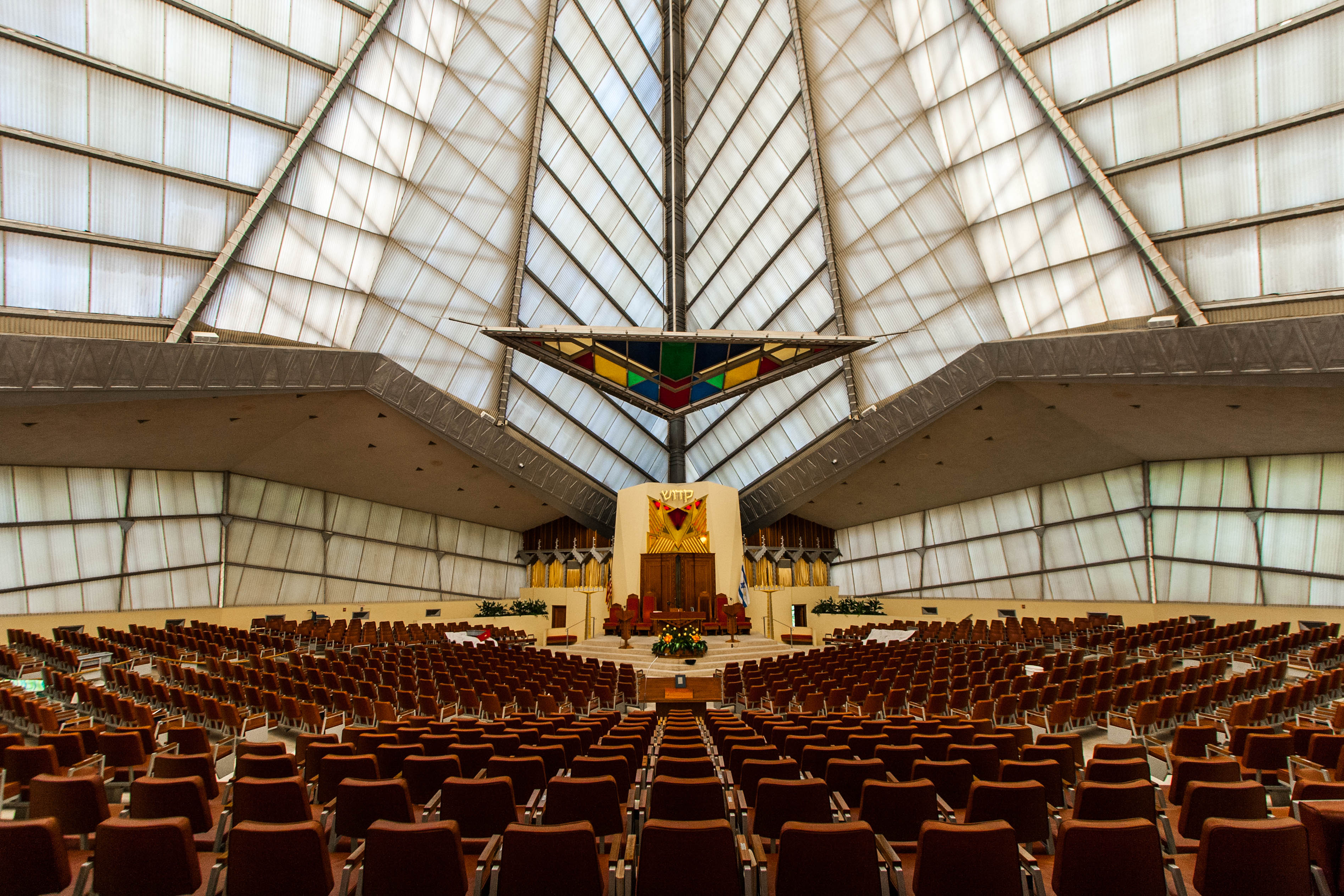
Beth Sholom Synagogue (1954) by Frank Lloyd Wright in Elkins Park, Pennsylvania

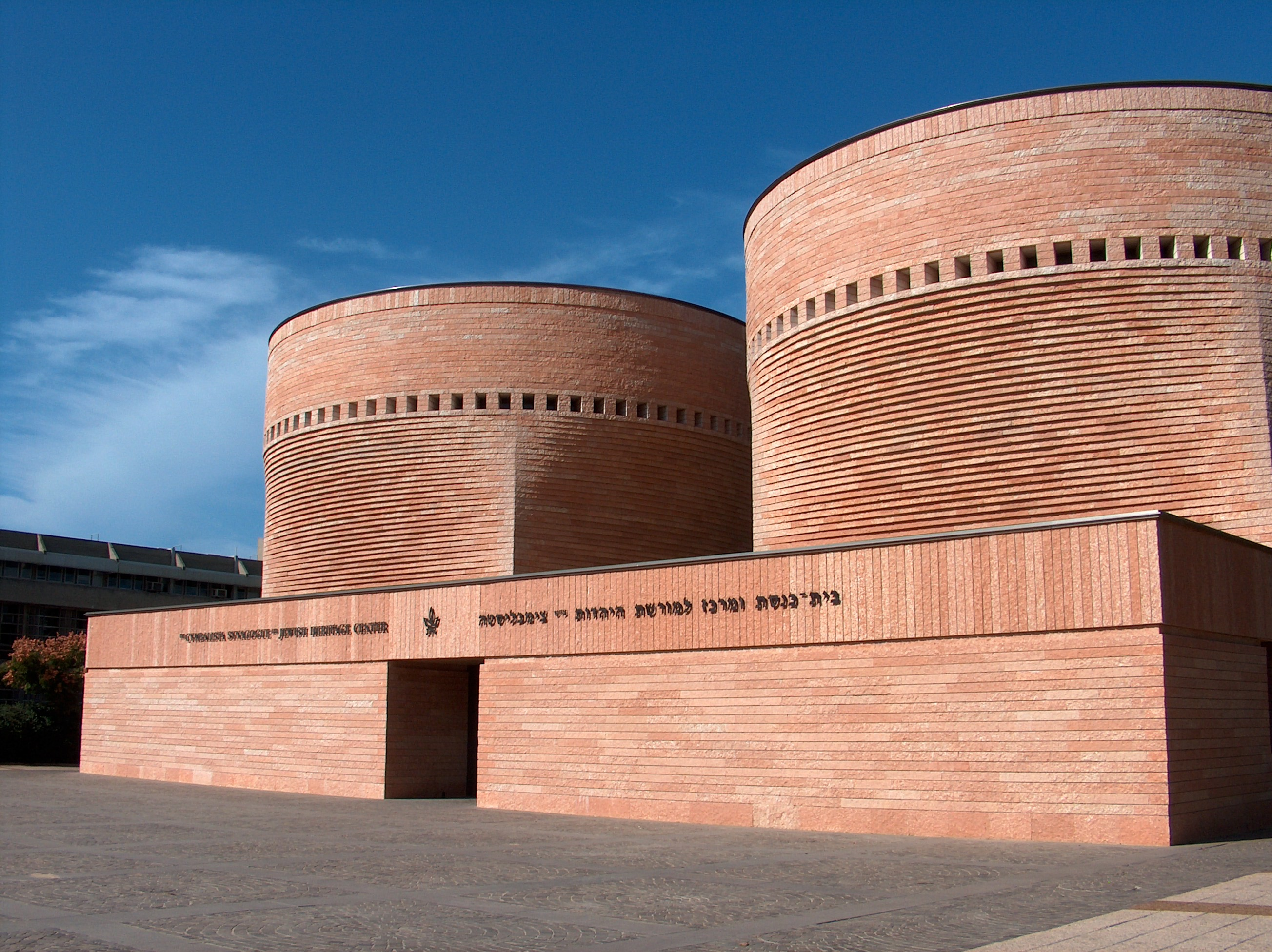
Cymbalista Synagogue (1997) by Mario Botta in Tel Aviv, Israel

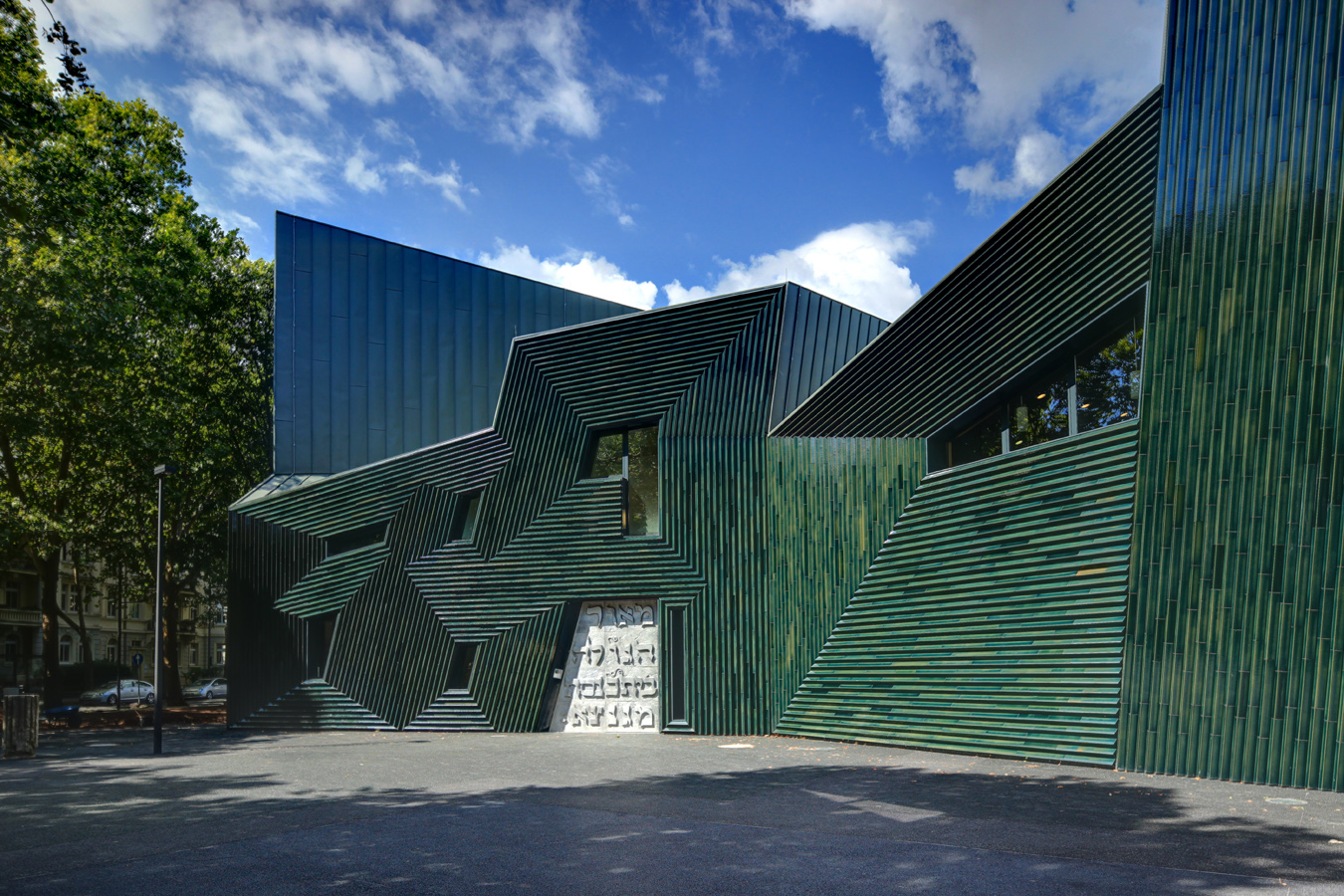
The deconstructivist New Synagogue (1999) by Manuel Herz in Mainz

== See also ==
- Jewish architecture
- List of Jewish architects
- Oldest synagogues in the world
