= New Synagogue (Mainz) =

Synagogue in Mainz, Germany

- German: Neuen Synagoge
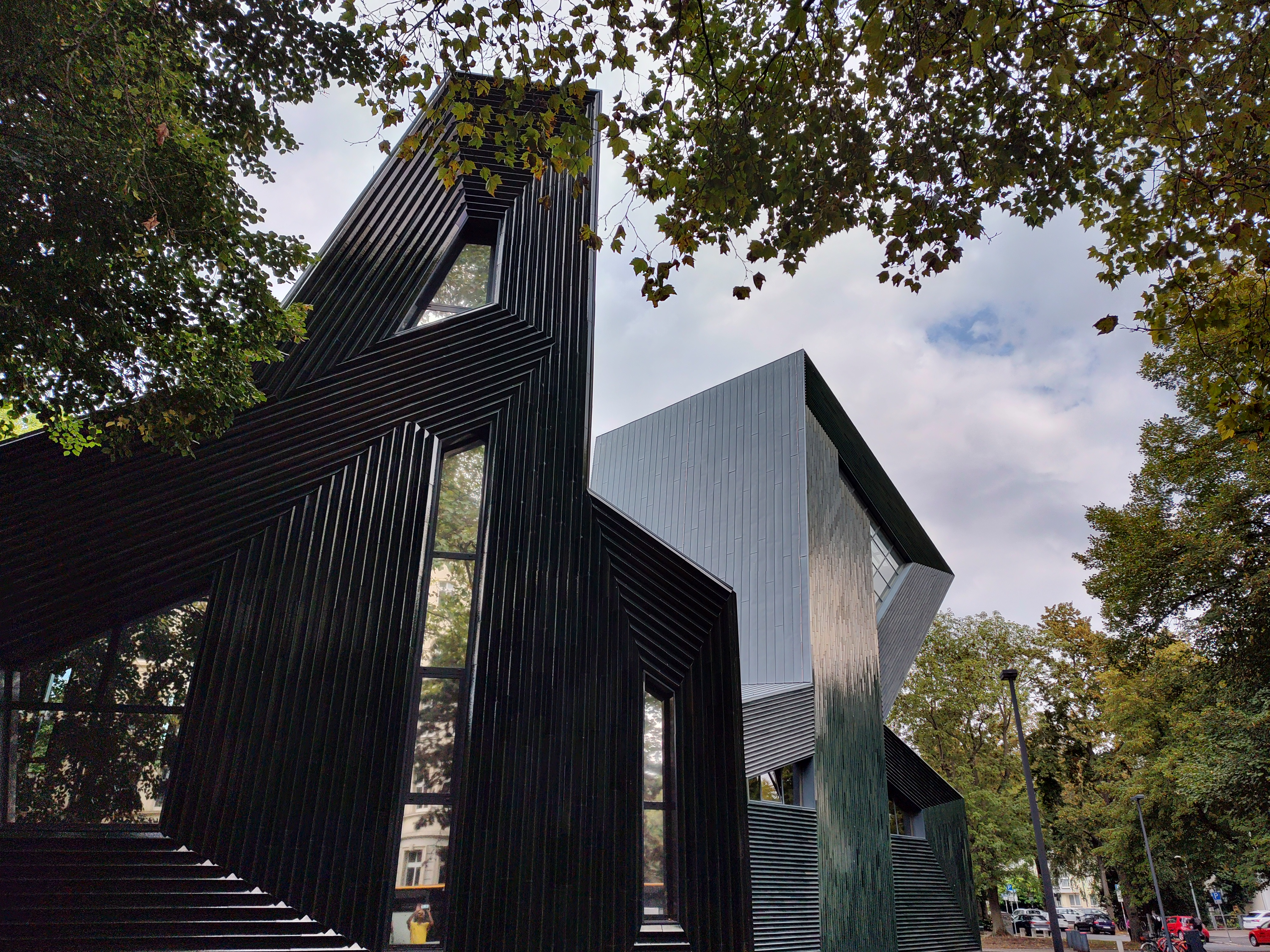
- The synagogue façade in 2022

- Location of the synagogue in Rhineland-Palatinate

Religion
- Affiliation: Judaism
- Rite: Nusach Ashkenaz
- Ecclesiastical or organisational status: Synagogue
- Status: Active

Location
- Location: Synagogenplatz, Mainz, Rhineland-Palatinate
- Country: Germany
- Coordinates: 50°0′31″N 8°15′34″E

Architecture
- Architect: Manuel Herz
- Type: Synagogue architecture
- Style: Modernist
- Completed: 2010
- Construction cost: €11 million

Specifications
- Direction of façade: East
- Capacity: 450 worshippers
- Materials: Concrete

The New Synagogue (German: Neuen Synagoge) is a Jewish congregation, community center, and synagogue, located on Synagogenplatz, Mainz in the state of Rhineland-Palatinate, in Germany. The Modernist-styled building was erected in 2010, on the site of the former main synagogue, destroyed in 1938, on the Hindenburgstraße (Note: The street was renamed as Synagogenplatz, due to controversial discussions surrounding Paul von Hindenburg.) of Mainz Neustadt.

== Initial position and planning ==
Mainz, known to the Jews as Magenza, was an important Jewish centre on the Rhine and has had impressive synagogues for many centuries. The Kristallnacht of 1938 ended this tradition. After the Second World War, the remains and premises of Mainz synagogues accommodated only a small group of returned community members. Before the fall of the Berlin Wall the community had a mere 140 citizens in total. In the 1990s, a large number of immigrants from Eastern Europe grew the community and new space was required. By December 2006, the community had grown to number 1,050 members.

In 1999, there was a competition to design a new synagogue building and a Jewish community centre. The winner was architect Manuel Herz. The estimated cost was approximately €11 million and the city of Mainz gave assurances it would contribute €3.5 million. The financing model outlined that the city, Rhineland-Palatinate, and the Federal Republic of Germany each contribute one-third of the construction costs. A building permit was issued in 2000. The demolition of the general customs office building (erected in 1955) at the site was not started until October 2008.

The prayer sanctuary of the New Synagogue offers approximately 450 places which corresponds to five times the previous prayer capacity. The draft reminded the deconstructivist architecture and symbolic organisation of the Jewish Museum, Berlin.

A Magenza foundation under the patronage of Prime Minister Kurt Beck and Lord Mayor Jens Beutel was committed to the building and sustaining this new synagogue, and a further 29 citizens and notables from Mainz and the region belong to the establishment founders.

== Architecture ==
The building reflects the Jewish-liturgical term Kedushah (Hebrew: קדושה, romanized: sanctification and exaltation). Cologne architect, Manuel Herz, intended to symbolize this with the five Hebrew letters the five ranges of the Jewish center for community events, adult education and as Hebrew school for school children. The letterforms were originally developed from picture symbols, from which the initial at the beginning of the respective symbol was associated later. Hebrew letters attain an object character, a quality of the representational one. The eastward-directed, (towards Jerusalem), horn-shaped roof of the assembly place represents a shofar. Mythologically the shofar stands for communication with God. This form is used to express the call of the community after YHWH, for listening to and receiving of eternal divine light and its wisdom. Traditionally the community was summoned together by blowing the shofar.

The synagogue contains a festival room, Mikveh, kosher kitchen, club room, kindergarten, classroom, social service, community office, library, meeting room and apartments. The Jewish community in Mainz offers an active cultural program, which is also open to non-Jewish visitors. The architect Manuel Herz received the German front prize for rainscreen fronts (VHF) in 2011. The building received the nomination for the Mies van der Rohe Prize for European Architecture, German Facade Prize 2011.

=== Completion ===
The foundation stone for the synagogue was laid on November 23, 2008. Andreas Berg and Dr Peter Waldmann wrote the text for the foundation stone. The topping out ceremony was committed on October 16, 2009. The inauguration was held on September 3, 2010, following weather delays; this date was the anniversary of the inauguration of the former synagogue in 1912. Attendees at the inauguration included Minister President Beck, Mayor Beutel, President of Germany Christian Wulff, and Yoram Ben-Zeev, the Israeli Ambassador.

== Gallery ==
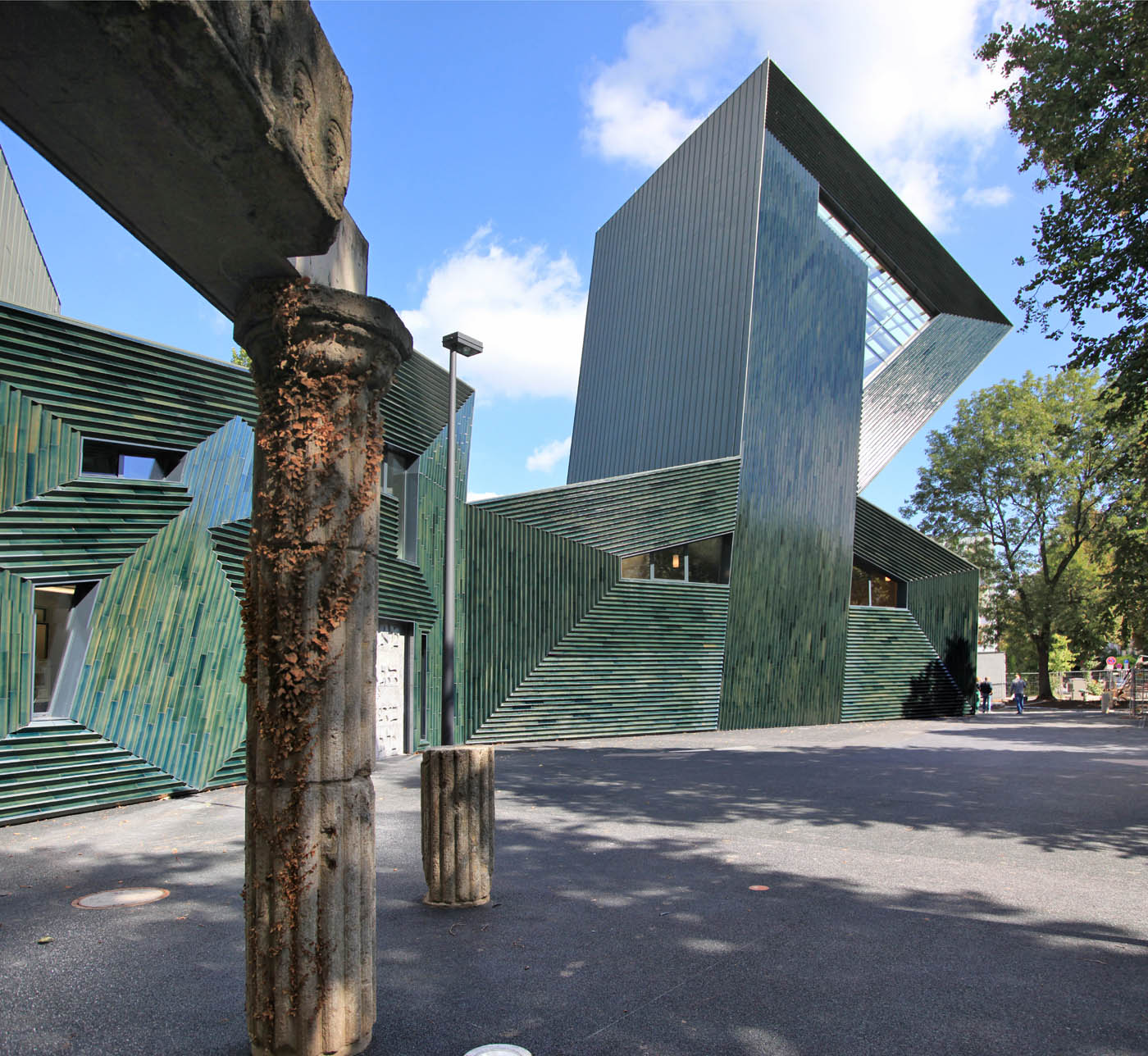
New Synagogue Mainz

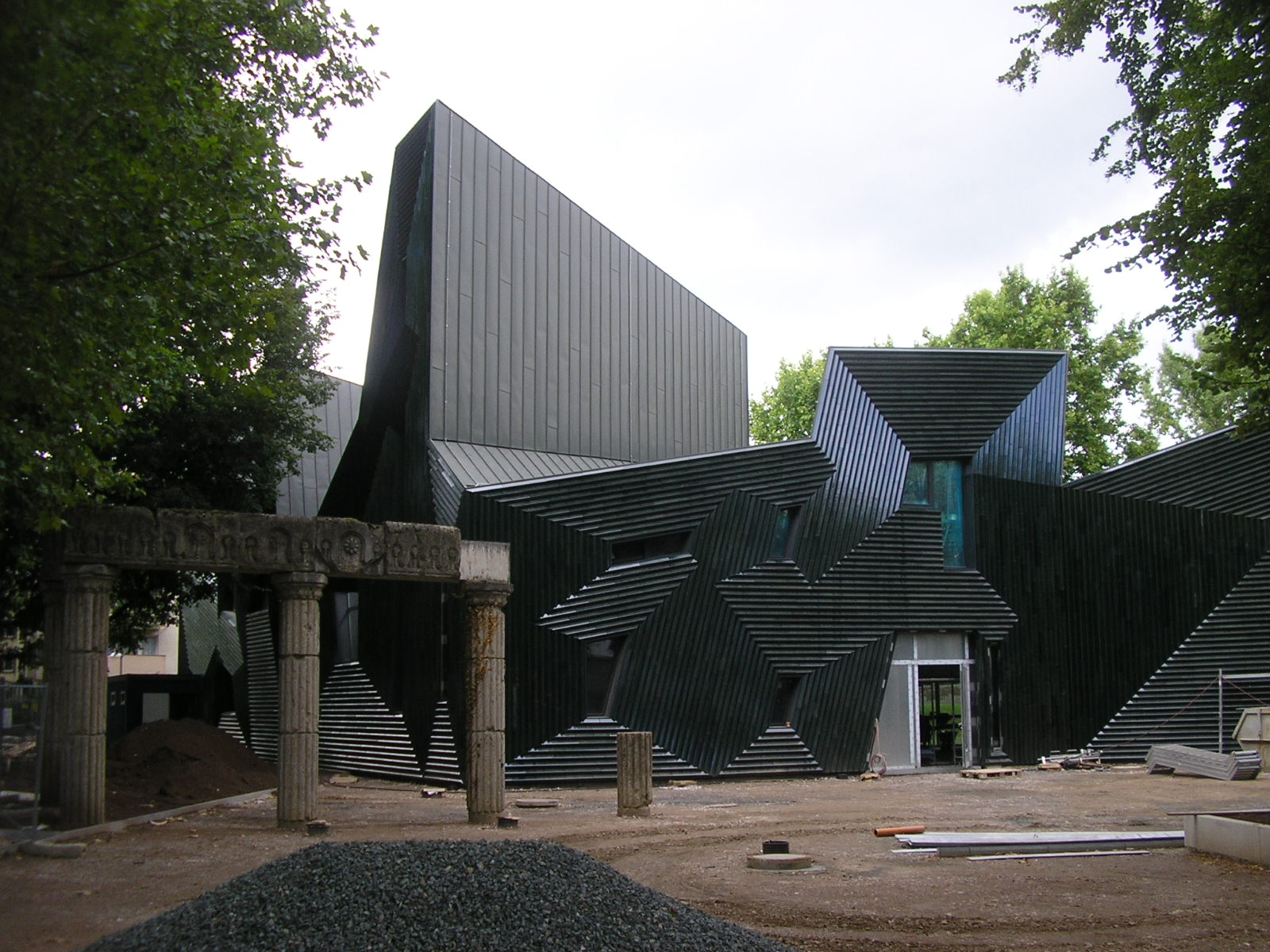
In the foreground remains of the former Main Synagogue from 1912

== See also ==
- History of the Jews in Germany
- List of synagogues in Germany (in German)
