= Manuel Herz =

German architect

Manuel Herz is an architect with a practice in Basel, Switzerland and Cologne, Germany.

== Education ==
He was educated at RWTH Aachen in Germany and at the Architectural Association in London.

== Career ==
He presented an academic paper at the Holcim Forum for Sustainable Construction 2007, organized by the Holcim Foundation for Sustainable Construction.

He served as head of research and teaching at ETH Studio Basel: Contemporary City Institute and teaches at Harvard University’s Graduate School of Design with Jacques Herzog and Pierre de Meuron. From 2015 to 2020 he was professor of urban and territorial design at the University of Basel.

Herz has published extensively on issues of diaspora and architecture. He is researching planning strategies of refugee camps and the dilemma of humanitarian action." He has written on Jewish architecture in Germany and taught at the Bartlett School of Architecture in London and KTH Stockholm.

He has received prizes and awards.

== Projects ==
- Babyn Yar Synagogue (2021)
- Maternity and Paediatric Hospital in Tambacounda, Senegal (2021)
- Ballet Mécanique, Housing in Zürich, Switzerland (2018)
- Housing and Creche Lyon, France (2013–15)
- Synagogue and Jewish Community Center, Mainz, Germany (2010)
- Wohn- und Geschäftshaus Cologne, Germany (2003)

== Select bibliography ==
- Herz, Manuel (2005). "Institutionalized Experiment: The Politics of 'Jewish Architecture' in Germany". Jewish Social Studies. 11 (3): 58–66. Project MUSE 188476.
- Herz, Manuel, Making sense of Darfur
- Herz, Manuel with Herzog, Jacques and de Meuron, Pierre: MetroBasel – The Model of a European Metropolitan Region (2009)
- Herz, Manuel, From Camp to City – Refugee Camps of the Western Sahara, Lars Müller Publishers (2012)
- Herz, Manuel and Rahbaran, Shadi: Nairobi: Migration Shaping the City, Lars Müller Publishers (2013)
- Herz, Manuel: African Modernism – The Architecture of Independence, Park Books (2015) // award: FILAF D'OR 2015
