= Mainz Jacobin Club =

German democratic political club (1792–1793)

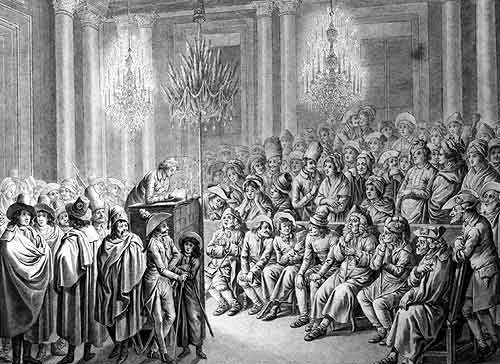
Meeting of the Mainz Jacobin Club in the academy hall of the Electoral Palace. At the lectern probably Georg Forster. In front of the bar sit the members of the Jacobin Club, behind them spectators and visitors.

The Mainz Jacobin Club, officially the Society of the Friends of Liberty and Equality (German: Gesellschaft der Freunde der Freiheit und Gleichheit) or the Society of Friends of the Republic (German: Gesellschaft der Freunde der Republik) was a German republican collaborationist political club based in Mainz. Inspired by Enlightenment universalism and modeled after the French Jacobin Club, the Mainz Jacobins (German: Die Jakobiner) admired the French Revolution and sought to export its political and intellectual framework to Germany.

The existence of the Mainz Jacobin Club largely coincided with the French occupation of southwestern Germany during the French Revolutionary Wars. The club was established by a group largely composed of professors from the University of Mainz on October 23, 1792, two days after the capture of Mainz by French Revolutionary troops led by Adam Philippe de Custine. Their meetings took place in the academy hall of the Electoral Palace in Mainz, the former residence of the Electoral Archbishop of Mainz. When the French National Convention mandated the formation of sister republics in the occupied territories west of the Rhine on February 24, 1793, the Mainz Jacobins would become the leading force behind the short-lived Rhenish-German Free State (German: Rhenisch-Deutscher Freistaat), more commonly known as the Republic of Mainz (German: Mainzer Republik; French: République de Mayence). At its height, the Mainz Jacobin Club had almost 500 members, the largest of the revolutionary clubs founded during the relatively brief period of French occupation. When the First Coalition recaptured the city on July 22nd, 1793, they immediately abolished the Republic, restored the Archbishop, outlawed the Mainz Jacobin Club, and persecuted its members.

== Background ==
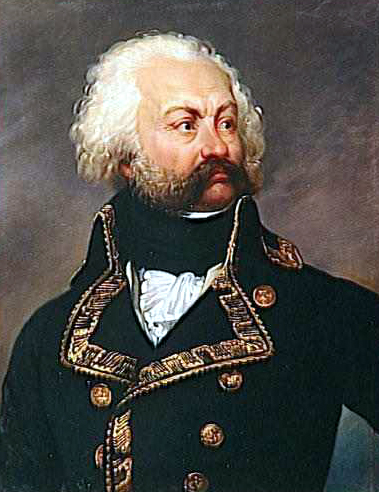
General Custine

Following France's declaration of war against Austria on April 20th, 1792, the leaders of the First Coalition held a princely congress, hosted by the Archbishop of Mainz at the Favorite Palace from the 19 to the 21 of July, 1792, to determine their response. There, the newly crowned Holy Roman Emperor and Archduke of Austria Francis II, the Prussian King Frederick William II, the host Elector of Mainz Friedrich Karl Joseph von Erthal, and numerous other princes and diplomats agreed to pursue military action. However, this first campaign ended with the retreat of the combined Austrian, Prussian, and French royalist force following the Battle of Valmy on September 20, 1792. The French Revolutionary Army immediately launched a counter-offensive and captured Mainz under General Adam Philippe de Custine on 21 October 1792. There he already found a considerable number of citizens who sympathised with the ideas of the French Revolution. These were mostly professors and students of the University of Mainz as well as officials of the electoral administration.

== Possible precursor organisations ==
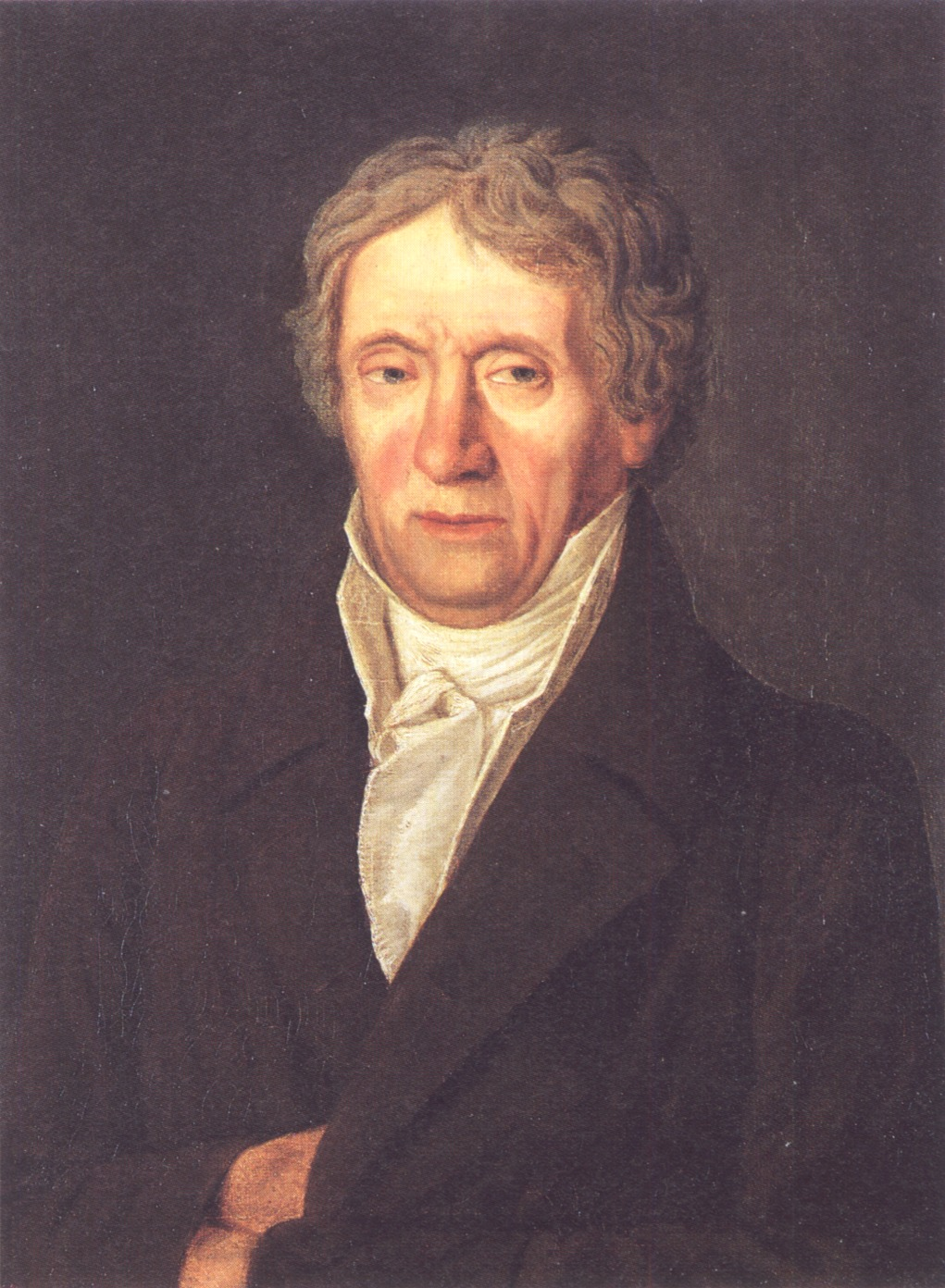
Matthias Metternich, an early Jacobin in the Gelehrten Lesegesellschaft, later renamed the Demokratische Lesegesellschaft from 1791

Whether institutions that can be interpreted as precursors to the Mainz Jacobin Club already existed during the electoral period remains a matter of controversy among historians. While scholars such as Heinrich Scheel, Walter Grab, Hans Grassl, and Jörg Schweigard clearly affirm this view, Franz Dumont argues against it.

The most likely precursor to the Mainz Jacobin Club was the Mainz Scholarly Reading Society (Mainzer Gelehrte Lesegesellschaft). Founded in 1781–82, its purpose was to make modern literature available at affordable prices and to provide a platform for discussion of current topics. The society’s collection alone included 24 political periodicals, and its membership comprised a large number of enlightened-liberal intellectuals, which led to increasing politicisation. This is further supported by the fact that future leading and radical Jacobins – such as Mathias Metternich, Felix Anton Blau, Anton Joseph Dorsch, and Andreas Joseph Hofmann, all professors at the electoral university – were members of the reading society. When the society split in 1791 over disagreements concerning writings on the French Revolution, Metternich and his colleague Andreas Joseph Hofmann played a leading role in dividing it into an "Aristocratic" and a "Democratic" reading society.

The Mainz branch of the politically active Illuminati movement, banned in 1785, also served as a gathering point for pre-revolutionary activities. Many later Mainz Jacobins, such as the electoral police official and later maire Franz Konrad Macké, had their first contacts with the ideas of the Age of Enlightenment here. After the dissolution of the Mainz Illuminati lodge in February 1786, a secret "Society of Propaganda" was founded as early as May of the same year. Its members were largely recruited from former Mainz Illuminati, and its activities closely resembled those of the Mainz Jacobin Club founded six years later. It is therefore unsurprising that three founding members of the Jacobin Club came from the ranks of the "Propaganda Club" and that the executive and correspondence committee of the Mainz Jacobin Club – with only one exception – consisted of the same active members from the circles of former Illuminati and propagandists.

It is also known that even before 1792, numerous private circles and groups existed in Mainz in which intellectuals – as well as university students who were not admitted to the "Scholarly Reading Society" – discussed Enlightenment and revolutionary ideas to varying degrees of activity.

== The Mainz Jacobin Club ==
=== Founding ===
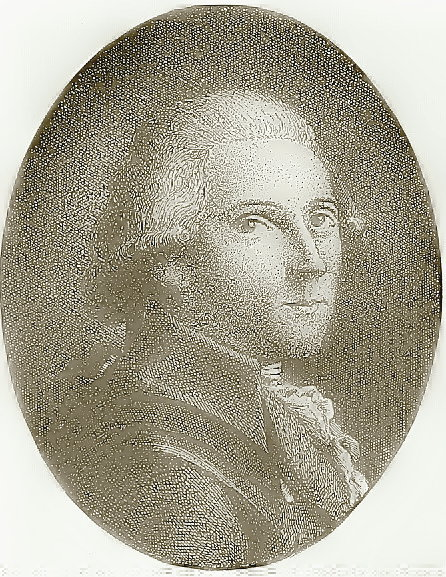
Georg Wilhelm Böhmer, initiator of the Mainz Jacobin Club

With General Custine’s seizure of power and the consequent incorporation of Mainz (as "Mayence") into the French First Republic, all the necessary conditions for political activity in the spirit of the new rulers of Mainz had been created. The theologian, canon lawyer, and former university professor from Worms, Georg Wilhelm Böhmer, who had by then become Custine’s secretary, had arrived in Mainz with the French troops. Already the next day, on 22 October 1792, he publicly called in the Privilegirte Mainzer Zeitung – of which he had just become editor – for the founding of a "Society of German Friends of Liberty and Equality" modelled on the Paris Jacobin Club:

Tonight at 6 o’clock a Society of German Friends of Liberty and Equality from all estates will gather in the great academy hall of the local palace and bind themselves by a solemn oath to live free or die. Citizen General Cüstine has promised to honour this scene with his presence in the name of the Republic of the Franks. Admission is open to every German for whom the happiness of his fatherland and of humanity groaning in chains of slavery is a sacred cause. It is noted, however, that no one may be admitted who does not belong to the society or who does not wish to join it by taking the aforesaid oath. All members will immediately after this ceremony sign their names beneath the oath formula in the society’s protocol, which will then, through daily public sessions, prepare the liberty and equality of the people of Mainz – and perhaps, God willing, that of the rest of the great German nation as well.

— Georg Wilhelm Böhmer in the Mainzer Zeitung No. 168, 22 October 1792

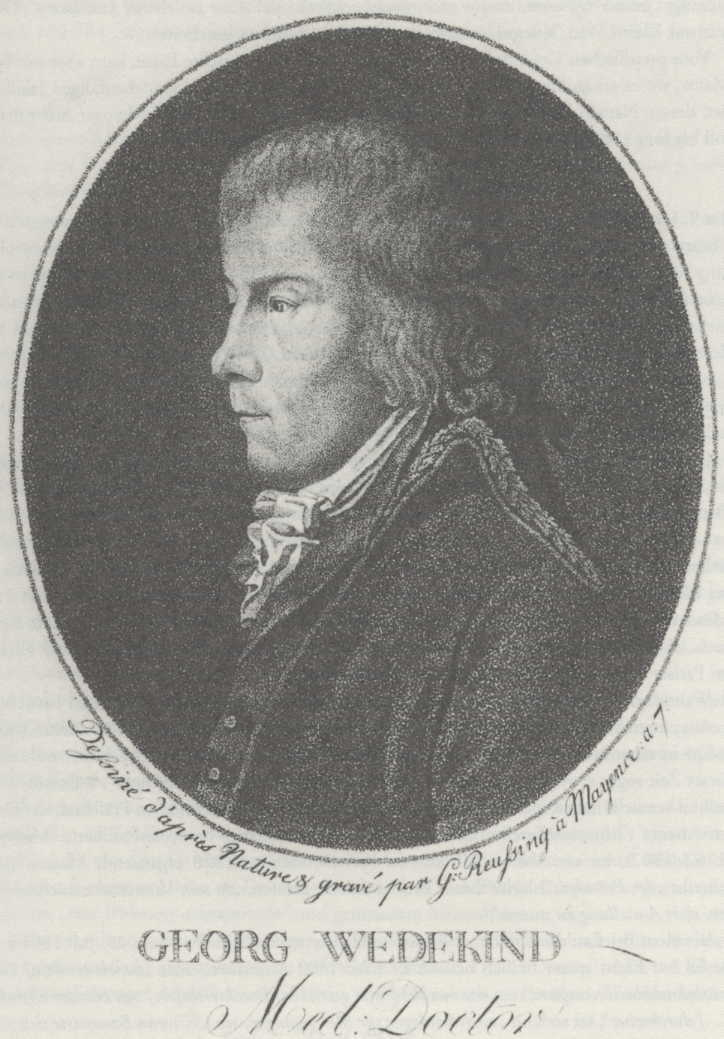
Georg Wedekind, c. 1800

The call was preceded by a meeting the previous day at the home of Custine’s adjutant-general Stamm, which Böhmer chaired. Even during his campaign, Custine had planned the establishment of revolutionary societies and sought experienced individuals to serve as suitable propagators of revolutionary ideas in these bodies. Böhmer’s activities were explicitly encouraged and supported by Custine, who also arranged payments through Böhmer to those willing to support the French cause. Böhmer, in turn, repeatedly invoked General Custine directly in his activities in Mainz and acted officially in his name and on his behalf.

Twenty people, mostly from the milieu of the University of Mainz, appeared on the evening of 23 October 1792 in the academy hall of the Electoral Palace. Böhmer arrived accompanied by the physician Georg von Wedekind and the merchant André Patocki. He opened the constitutive session by excusing General Custine, who was detained by "pressing military affairs", and had propaganda material distributed. Speeches followed by court councillor Kaspar Hartmann – who would develop from an electoral court official into one of the most uncompromising Mainz Jacobins – as well as by professors Georg Wedekind and Mathias Metternich, in which the old regime of the Elector and his aristocrats was primarily attacked. The attendees then signed a joint protocol. In it they welcomed the liberation and support provided by the French, formally declared the establishment of the Society of the Friends of Liberty and Equality, and resolved to request the statutes of the Strasbourg Jacobin Club. The first session of the Mainz Jacobin Club ended with the solemn oath of admission: To live free or die!

The founding members of the Mainz Club included, besides Böhmer, the university professors Mathias Metternich, Georg Wedekind, and Andreas Joseph Hofmann, additional professors and students of the university, as well as merchants such as André Patocki and Georg Häfelin, and military men such as Rudolf Eickemeyer. At the next session the following day, Georg Häfelin was elected the club’s founding president, with Mathias Metternich as his deputy.

=== Growth and peak ===
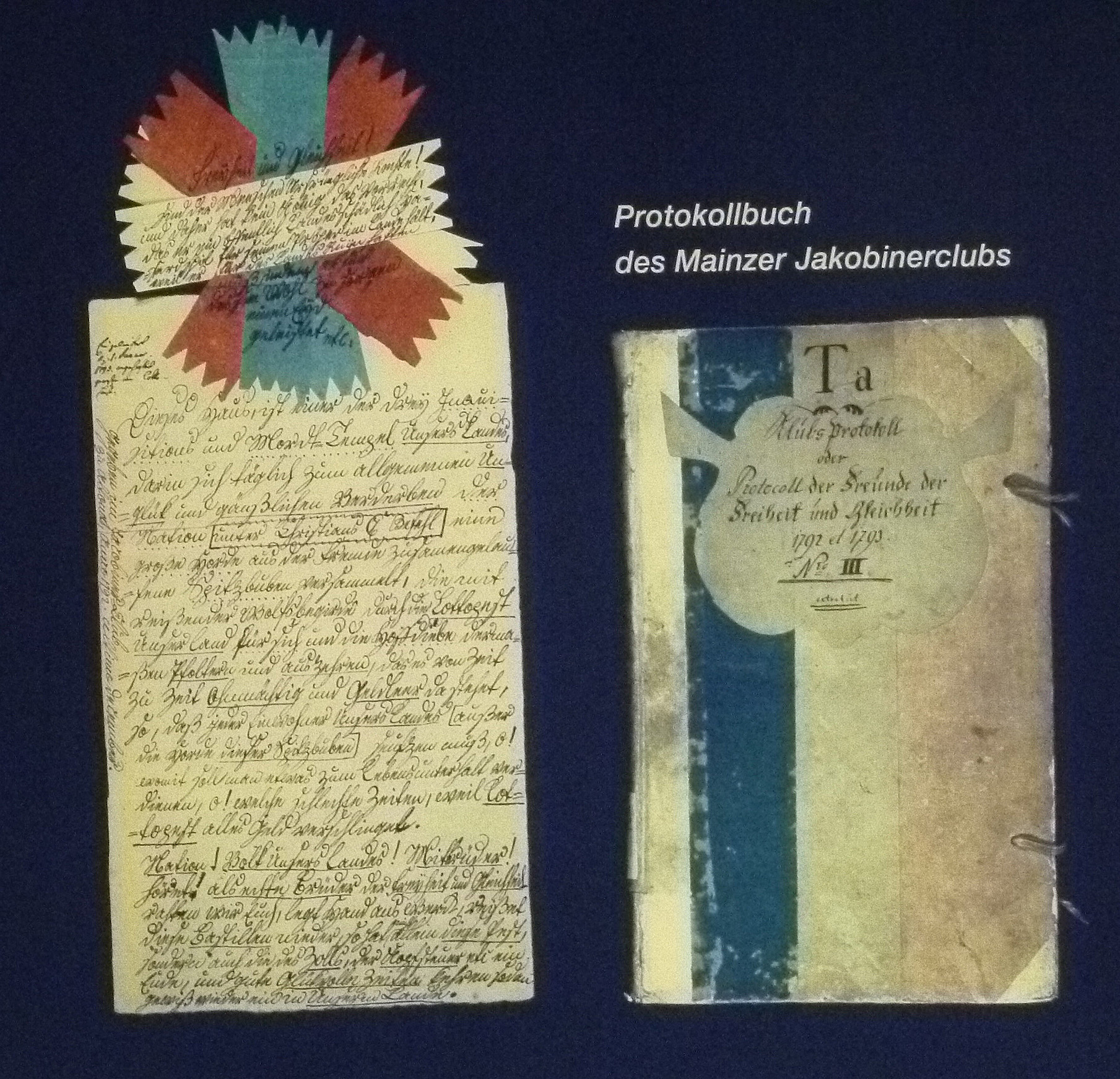
Protocol book of the Mainz Jacobin Club

Already at the second meeting on 24 October, which General Custine also attended and addressed, the academy hall was overcrowded. In the ensuing roughly two-week founding phase, membership grew rapidly, reaching a peak of exactly 492 registered members by the end of November 1792. During this period the club’s political programme was drawn up in its essentials.

Attempts by conservative and moderate forces to limit the Jacobin Club to a merely passive discussion forum within the ongoing changes were clearly rejected. Most members wished to take an active part in the democratisation process that was now under way. The members’ energetic and self-motivated participation in actions to bring about societal change was demonstrated by the high-profile initiative to erect a liberty tree on the Höfchen and by the creation of a “Red Book of Liberty” and a “Black Book of Slavery”, in which the people of Mainz could voluntarily register and thereby vote for or against the revolutionary ideas of the French.

Jacobins arriving from Alsace, such as Anton Joseph Dorsch – who until 1791 had held the chair of philosophy at the University of Mainz and had been recruited earlier by Custine to support the newly founded Jacobin clubs in the left-Rhenish territories – contributed significantly to intensifying the club’s work. In the early phase they decisively shaped the structure, organisation, and outward propaganda of the Mainz Jacobin Club. The club’s popularity and prestige rose further with the later accession of prominent Mainz personalities. The entry of the popular police commissioner Franz Konrad Macké, who was subsequently elected maire, sent an important signal to the still-underrepresented guild citizens. The accession two days later – after initial reservations and careful consideration of his future political stance – of the scholar and explorer Georg Forster, who was famous far beyond the city and regional borders, attracted attention outside Mainz as well.

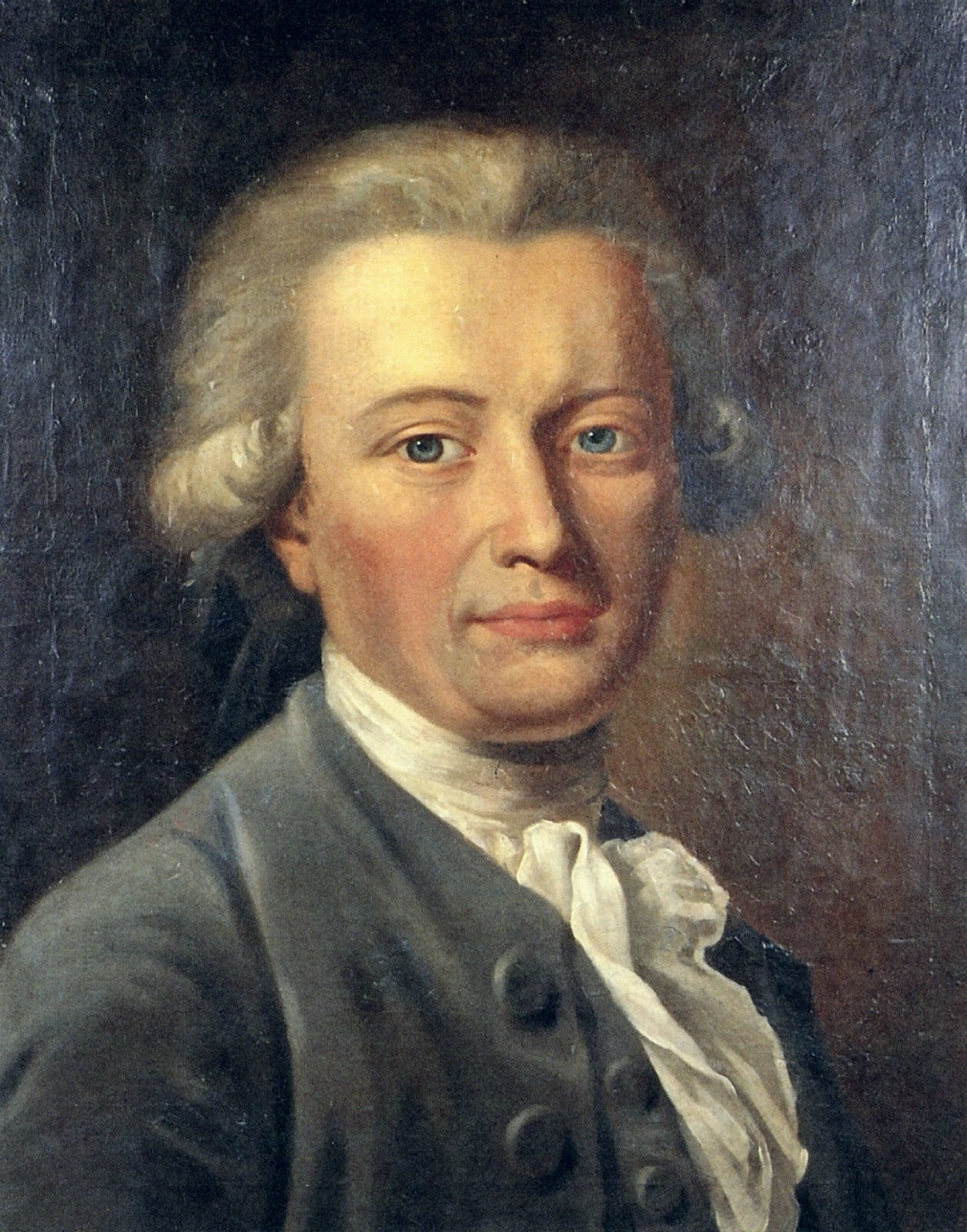
Georg Forster, painting by J. H. W. Tischbein

In mid-November General Custine appointed leading club members such as Forster and Dorsch to high offices in the newly created civil administration. Dorsch, for example, became president of the “General Administration” and thus the highest civilian representative in the entire French-occupied territory. This increase in authority, executive power, and prestige – and thus Custine’s esteem for the Mainz Jacobins active in the club – together with the peak membership of almost 500 at the end of November, marked the high point of the Mainz Jacobin Club’s influence.

From the beginning of December 1792 the previously steady growth in membership stagnated. This was largely due to the first military setbacks suffered by the French Revolutionary Army near Frankfurt am Main against Prussian and Austrian forces, together with the recapture of Frankfurt by those troops. On 13 December 1792 the French occupation authorities officially declared a state of war for Mayence. The exercise of unrestricted powers by Custine’s military council severely curtailed the civil administration’s room for manoeuvre. The Mainz Jacobin Club was greatly restricted in its activities, and former sympathisers and members now kept their distance from the Jacobins because of the uncertain political future. Another development that proved extremely negative for the club’s future began at the end of December 1792. Differences of opinion that had already existed since mid-November regarding the future of the left-Rhenish territory – especially the question of possible union with France – led to internal ideological and programmatic disputes. This resulted in the formation of two camps among leading members: a moderate wing and a more radical one. These divisions now became public.

=== Dissolution, end, refoundation and final dissolution ===
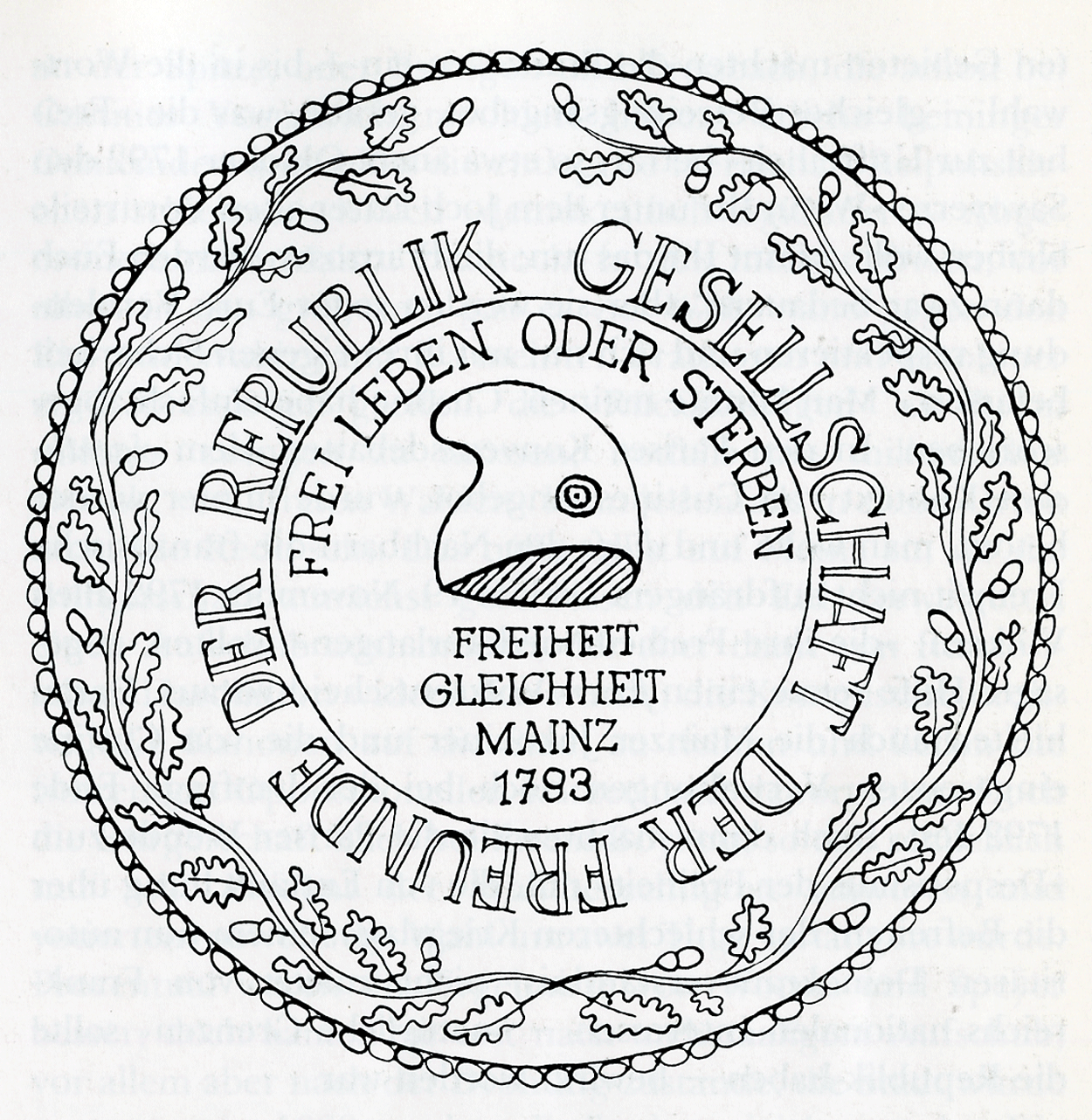
Seal of the second Jacobin Club, 1793

The decline of the Mainz Jacobin Club continued into 1793. Fierce disputes, now fought out in public, broke out between the moderate and radical wings. The radical leadership around Dorsch, Wedekind, and Böhmer faced growing opposition over the further course of “revolutionising” the population. At the club meeting on 10 January 1793 the topic Why do the principles of liberty and equality find so little approval? was to be discussed. The session ended in scandal when Andreas Hofmann, spokesman for the dissatisfied members, sharply attacked Wedekind, Dorsch as head of the General Administration, Forster as his deputy, Friedrich Georg Pape as chairman of the influential correspondence committee, and ultimately the French occupation authorities themselves. By this time Hofmann represented the interests of the Mainz population – especially the lower social classes – within the club. The very next day Custine charged him with slander and threatened him with execution for treason. The club members he had attacked immediately countered by accusing Hofmann – falsely – of collaborating with the coadjutor and deputy of the Elector, Karl Theodor von Dalberg. The escalation of these internal conflicts, the club’s increasing paralysis, and the first public criticism of the behaviour of French soldiers and their leadership – which stood in stark contrast to the autumn of 1792 – ultimately led to a further stagnation of the “revolutionisation” of the population, the club’s primary goal.

Progress was neither as rapid nor as lasting as the French (and most German Jacobins) still desired. Both the German Jacobins and the French administration were disappointed with the “liberated” population, which in their view behaved too phlegmatically and failed to take the initiative for political change themselves. Forster in particular expressed – though never publicly – in private letters his despair at the people’s incapacity for freedom: I remain convinced that Germany is not ripe for a revolution… our crude, poor, uneducated people can only rage, but cannot constitute itself.

Little more was heard of the right that Custine had promised the people of Mainz on 26 October 1792: “Your own unfettered will shall decide your fate. Even if you prefer slavery to the benefits with which liberty beckons you, it remains your choice to decide which despot shall return your chains to you.” A decree of the French National Convention on 15 December 1792 marked a paradigm shift – already foreshadowed – in revolutionary policy in the occupied left-Rhenish territories. The right of self-determination of the liberated population was effectively suspended, and the Convention in Paris now intensified pressure on the occupied German territories, which increasingly acquired the status of “conquests of war”. Primary assemblies were to be held to elect and establish provisional governments and courts in order to finally control and accelerate the process of political transformation on the French model. To this end the Convention dispatched three of its members – Nicolas Haussmann, Merlin de Thionville, and Jean François Reubell – together with two national commissioners as direct representatives of the Convention and the Executive Council to Mainz. The latter, in cooperation with General Custine, were to represent the interests of the occupying power France in the provisional government to be elected. Instructions debated and adopted in the Convention on the same day granted them extensive powers: the two national commissioners were immediately to eliminate all openly or secretly active reactionary and counter-revolutionary forces, especially among the nobility and clergy. They were responsible for overseeing the French occupation army and for investigating and remedying deficiencies in equipment or supplies. They also had far-reaching authority in political matters concerning the administration still to be elected and constituted in Mainz. The Alsatian intellectual Jean-Frédéric Simon and his brother-in-law Gabriel Grégoire, also from Alsace, were appointed on 13 January 1793 and arrived in Mainz on 31 January.

This increasingly strict control from Paris was compounded by military defeats of the French troops and the steady advance of allied forces (Prussian and Imperial troops from various parts of the Holy Roman Empire) toward Mainz. All of this led to a drastic decline in membership from 492 at the end of November 1792 to about 150 in February 1793 and to the growing irrelevance of the club and its activities.

In March 1793 the French national commissioner of the Executive Power, Jean-Frédéric Simon, finally announced in Mainz the closure of the Mainz Jacobin Club and the simultaneous founding of a “Société des Allemands libres”. This successor organisation, called in German the “Society of the Friends of the Republic”, was intended to replace the previous club while excluding the former moderate members. Like its model, the Jacobin Club in Paris, it was primarily to prepare the substantive groundwork for parliamentary debate in the Rhenish-German National Convention. This “second Mainz Jacobin Club” began its work in March 1793; the last trace of this now-insignificant successor dates to early May 1793. At the latest with the encirclement of Mainz in June 1793 it quietly dissolved. Immediately after the recapture of Mainz on 23 July 1793 many club members were subjected to reprisals by the population; there were beatings and looting in the city and outside its gates. Goethe himself witnessed such mistreatment of fleeing club members and later described it in his autobiographical work Belagerung von Mainz (“Siege of Mainz”):

Several travelling carriages again hurried down the road, but the citizens of Mainz had stationed themselves in the roadside ditches, and as the fugitives escaped one ambush they fell into the hands of another. The carriage was stopped; if French men or women were found they were allowed to escape, but well-known club members were not spared. A very handsome three-horse travelling carriage rolled up; a charming young lady did not fail to show herself at the window and greet people on both sides; but the postilion was seized by the reins, the door was opened, and an arch-club member at her side was immediately recognised. He could hardly be mistaken: short in stature, rather stout, broad-faced, and pock-marked. He was instantly dragged out by the feet; the door was closed and the beauty wished a happy journey. He, however, was hauled onto the nearest field and beaten and battered frightfully; every limb of his body was broken, his face unrecognisable. A guard finally took charge of him and brought him to a farmhouse, where, lying on straw, he was protected from further violence by his fellow citizens but not from insults, gloating, and abuse.

— Johann Wolfgang von Goethe, Belagerung von Mainz

Approximately one hundred of the most active club members, including for example Mathias Metternich and Franz Macké, were taken as hostages to the fortresses of Königstein and Ehrenbreitstein and imprisoned for an extended period. The last 39 prominent former members, who by then were detained at the Petersberg Citadel in Erfurt, were allowed to emigrate to France at the beginning of 1795; in exchange, Mainz residents deported in 1793 were permitted to return. Other leading club members, such as Andreas Joseph Hofmann, managed to leave the city unmolested. Many went into exile in Strasbourg or Paris, where a “Societé des Refugiés Mayençais”, an association of exiled Mainz revolutionaries, existed.

Even less active or purely passive members of the Mainz Jacobin Club were affected. Craftsmen who had been members, for instance, were expelled from their guilds at the instigation of colleagues loyal to the old regime. Former electoral officials or holders of public offices who had publicly exposed themselves through club membership were punished in various ways, ranging from fines and suspension from office to expulsion from the Electorate of Mainz. Nevertheless, many of these “clubists” would again play leading roles in the now permanently French “Mayence” from 1798 onward.

=== Organisation ===
After the club’s constitution, its organisation and rules were established in the following period – until early December 1792. These were essentially modelled on the Paris and Strasbourg Jacobin clubs, the latter of which included many German émigrés. At the founding session it had been decided, among other things, to request the statutes from the Strasbourg Jacobins. At the second club meeting on 24 October the presidium was elected, with the merchant Georg Häfelin as president and Mathias Metternich as vice-president, and it was resolved to hold sessions in public as a matter of principle.

The presidium consisted of the president and vice-president as well as four secretaries, who were elected anew every four weeks. The club’s bodies were the public plenary session and the non-public “Comité général”. In addition, five further committees were gradually installed between November 1792 and January 1793. These dealt with different tasks: the education, security, economy, charity, and correspondence committees. The education or enlightenment committee (“Comité d’instruction”) was of particular importance. Consisting of 21 members in total, it not only set the agenda for club sessions but also independently conducted revolutionary propaganda. The population was to be comprehensively enlightened through public lectures by members on topics such as the constitution, law, finance, science, or religion. The security committee, modelled on its Parisian counterpart, was established to combat counter-revolutionaries but also proved an effective instrument against opposition inside and outside the club. The charity committee was intended to assist needy Jacobins but also persons outside the club whom it was hoped to win over to membership. The correspondence committee, established immediately after the club’s founding, was likewise of great importance. Staffed with high-calibre members such as Metternich, Wedekind, Patocki, Hofmann, Westhofen, and later also Forster and Pape, this committee engaged in extensive national and international correspondence. It was also responsible for the “affiliation” – the fraternisation of the Mainz Jacobin Club with the clubs in Strasbourg and especially Paris – a process that brought the Mainz club considerable prestige and authority and was psychologically very important for the Mainz Jacobins.

Men from the age of 18 (from early November 24) could become members. Certain social and occupational groups such as servants, day labourers, and women in general were excluded from membership. A prospective candidate had to be proposed by one Jacobin and endorsed by five further members. If no more than eleven club members raised objections in three consecutive sessions, the candidate was admitted.

A key aspect of the Mainz Jacobin Club’s activity was its fundamentally public character. In accordance with a resolution passed on the second day of its existence, all club sessions were public. Initially meeting every evening in the academy hall of the Electoral Palace, the club later met only four evenings a week. When the palace was converted into a hospital at the beginning of December 1792, the club moved to the “Comödienhaus”.

=== Size and composition ===
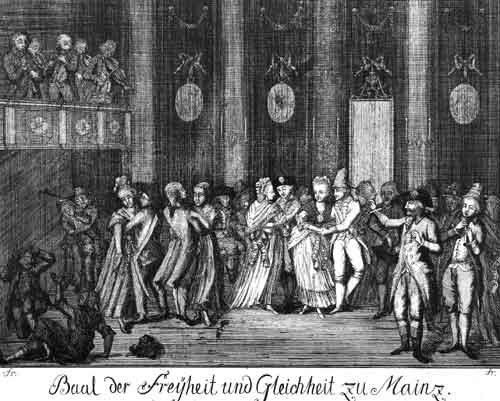
Celebratory event in the academy hall of the former Electoral Palace

With a total of 492 registered members, the Mainz Jacobin Club was of considerable size – even in comparison with similar institutions later established in the likewise French-occupied cities of Speyer and Worms. The roughly 450 members resident in Mainz were drawn from the approximately 7,000 Mainz inhabitants eligible for membership. Of the city’s total population of 23,000–25,000 in 1792, only men above the age of 18 (later 24) were eligible; women and younger men were not permitted to join. Thus the degree of political organisation within the population was about 6% – a figure rarely achieved by comparable French organisations or modern political parties.

The registered members of the Mainz Jacobin Club came from nearly all strata of Mainz society. After completing the formal admission procedure, new members entered their names in a membership list kept for the club by the notary Johann Baptist Bittong. This list, later stored in the Hauptstaatsarchiv in Darmstadt, was the only authentic source on the club’s membership until its destruction in World War II. Fifty members of the Jacobin Club were French. The most prominent member was General Custine himself, who – citing military obligations – did not join until 18 November 1792.

The numerically largest group, at about 45% but almost entirely passive, consisted of small merchants and master craftsmen and journeymen representing the guild citizenry. They were followed by members of the educated bourgeoisie and intellectuals – professors, clergy, physicians, jurists, and students – at 21%. Next, with equal strength, came former electoral officials and French citizens at 10% each. Eight percent of club members gave no occupational designation upon joining; this group often included farmers, for example. The proportion of large-scale merchants was vanishingly small; they kept their distance from the Mainz Jacobin Club.

==== Professors and other intellectuals ====
Although only about one in five members belonged to this group, their influence on the club’s activities was disproportionately large. Almost all professors who had already been politically active before October 1792 – such as Wedekind, Metternich, Eickemeyer, and Hofmann – were either directly involved in the club’s founding or joined soon thereafter. With the accession of the internationally renowned researcher and writer Georg Forster, who joined only at the beginning of November, the institution gained additional renown.

With few exceptions, the group of professors and intellectuals – such as the jurist, publisher, and publicist Christoph Friedrich Cotta – provided the club’s presidents and vice-presidents.

==== Students of the University of Mainz ====
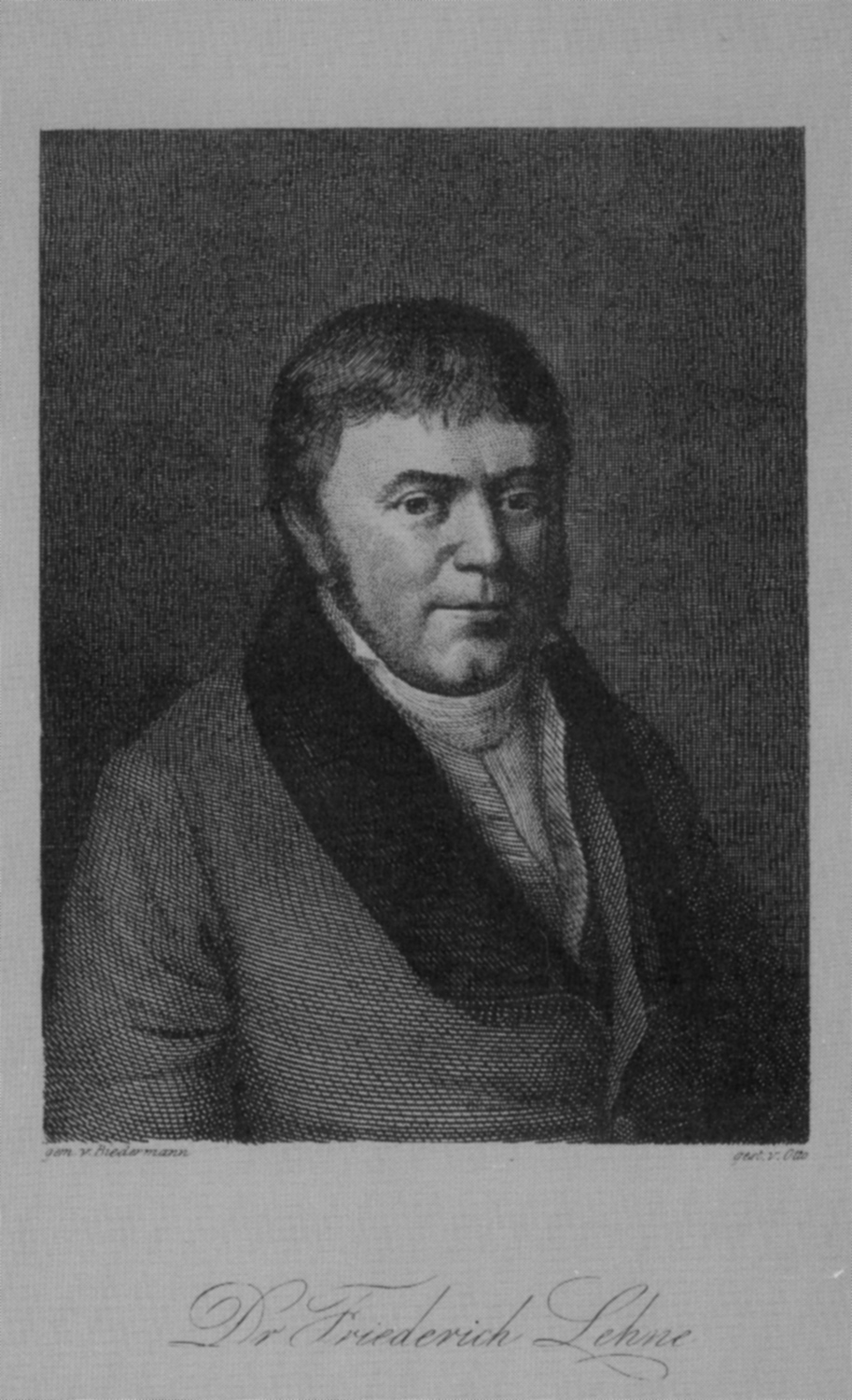
Friedrich Lehne

With the founding of the club, numerous students from the circles of Metternich, Wedekind, and Hofmann also joined. The initial minimum age for membership was 18 years, but on Dorsch’s proposal – despite fierce protests from the younger, mostly student members – it was raised to 24 years on 7 November 1792. This excluded many students from membership, though those who had already joined were allowed to remain.

Among these students, Nikolaus Müller and Friedrich Lehne deserve particular mention; both had been politically active beforehand and rose quickly in the revolutionary hierarchy. The law student Dominik Meuth was also a founding member and later, together with the former court councillor Kaspar Hartmann, published the newspaper Fränkischer Beobachter.

==== Electoral officials ====
The membership of the Mainz Jacobin Club also included some high-ranking officials of the electoral court. Officials made up about 11% of the total membership. The electoral court councillor Kaspar Hartmann, for example, was involved from the very beginning and at the founding meeting on 23 October 1792 gave a speech calling for the “revival of the hitherto suppressed human rights and the introduction of liberty and equality” while attacking leading Mainz aristocrats. The early entry of the electoral police commissioner Franz Konrad Macké was also widely noted by the people of Mainz.

==== Major merchants ====
As already mentioned, their share of the membership was extremely small. One of the leading representatives of this small group was, however, the merchant André Patocki. Even in electoral times he had belonged to the pro-revolutionary circle around Mathias Metternich and was a founding member of the Mainz Jacobin Club. On 24 October 1792, the second day of the club’s existence, the merchant Georg Häfelin was deliberately elected its first president. Together with Mathias Metternich as vice-president, he held the office until 24 November 1792. Patocki and Häfelin also played important roles in the later Mainz municipal administration. Eight days after the club’s constitution, the 24-year-old Jewish money-changer Nathan Maas joined. He took part in the procession that erected the first liberty tree in Mainz on the Höfchen on 3 November 1792. On the same day that he took the oath to the revolutionary constitution, Maas left the Jacobin Club again in spring 1793. For his support of the revolutionary cause he was arrested and imprisoned on electoral territory at the end of 1794 and expelled from Mainz in 1796.

==== Craftsmen ====
The craftsmen, still organised in guilds, together with small merchants and lower electoral officials formed the largest single group of club members at 45%. Within the organised guilds, however, the roughly 200 Jacobin craftsmen represented only 10% of guild citizens. This numerical dominance of craftsmen was not reflected at the leadership level of the Mainz Jacobin Club, which was dominated by intellectuals such as professors, publicists, students, or higher electoral officials.

=== Political activities ===
Many of the leading club members had already been politically committed to the ideals of the French Revolution before the club’s founding. With the establishment of the Mainz Jacobin Club and the patronage of General Custine, these activities were now concentrated, intensified, and extended beyond the city limits. The Mainz Jacobin Club became the most important organ of the Mainz Jacobins and the most important instrument of the French occupation authorities for the political mobilisation of the population. Its main task was the enlightenment, information, and of course the revolutionisation of the Mainz population. To this end the active club members used above all the public assembly evenings in the academy hall of the Electoral Palace. There, in front of club members and – at the club’s peak – up to 1,000 visitors, political speeches were delivered, sometimes printed immediately and distributed free of charge or sold later.

Leading members of the Jacobin Club such as Mathias Metternich visited villages around Mainz in their role as “voting commissioners” (Sub-Commissair) at the end of 1792 and beginning of 1793, campaigning for the ideas of the French Revolution and specifically for the establishment of a republic on the Parisian model and the acceptance of the “Frankish constitution”. The vote on a new constitution and a new form of state (Mainz Republic), initiated by the General Administration consisting of nine club members, was the last and – in terms of eligible citizens – the most concrete attempt at revolutionisation. In the context of this constitutional referendum the Mainz Jacobins provided massive on-the-ground support with personal commitment,, though with very mixed success.

At the subsequent elections of local officials (in Mainz a maire and deputy were elected) and deputies to the Rhenish-German National Convention, the parliament of the intended Mainz Republic, held from 24 to 26 February 1793, however, club members were poorly represented. In the name lists of the six Mainz electoral sections a total of only 168 club members and 15 presumed club members were recorded, making up 49% of all voters. Since only 8% (372 citizens) of the 4,626 eligible voters in the entire Mainz urban area turned out to vote, the active club members on their part failed to mobilise either their own members or the eligible population politically. On the contrary, the elections were boycotted by the vast majority of eligible Mainz citizens – in marked contrast to the other large cities of Worms and Speyer – as a conscious political demonstration.

The political work of the now-dissolved club was continued by its leading members in other areas of public and political life. In the municipal administration every elected official from Maire Macké downward was a former, usually leading, club member. In the Rhenish-German National Convention both the president Andreas Joseph Hofmann and the vice-president Georg Forster were leading club members. Likewise, of the 45 candidates who received any votes at all, all but two were former club members.

The political stance of the Mainz Jacobin Club toward the occupying power France and its goals was ambivalent throughout its active existence. Initially almost unanimous with the French on revolutionary aims, this changed toward the end of 1792. A more radical wing around Wedekind, Dorsch, Pape, and Metternich believed that the revolutionary ideas and goals could only be realised through unconditional cooperation with the French. They advocated the closest possible attachment to France, which after the founding of the Mainz Republic was to become a petition for reunion with France, and the Rhine as the republic’s frontier with aristocratic-despotic Germany. The more moderate wing, which included Hofmann and Macké, thought more pragmatically. They saw on the one hand the lack of support from the population, especially peasants and guild citizens, and on the other the increasingly violent and restrictive behaviour of the French occupying power, especially the army. Hofmann and Macké tended in their respective offices to represent the interests of the Mainz population vis-à-vis the French occupation authorities rather than those of their more radical colleagues in the club.

Despite all the quarrels, the work of the Mainz Jacobins – and at a later date the affiliation of Mainz and Rhenish Hesse with France – provided a starting point for the political and social attitudes of the population in southwestern Germany in later attempts at liberal-democratic development. The Hambach Festival of 1832 was not coincidentally organised by citizens who had grown up or been politically active in a significantly more liberal system than the rest of Germany. Important components of the system were known as the Rhenish institutions and concerned primarily the liberal legislation and jurisdiction adopted from the French period. Some were first-generation Jacobins such as Georg Friedrich Rebmann or Franz Konrad Macké who was still serving as mayor of Mainz at the time, while others were members of the next or following generations such as Germain Metternich, son of Mathias Metternich, or Franz Heinrich Zitz, grandson of the club member Jakob Schneiderhenn. And so as late as 1833, exactly forty years after the dissolution of the Mainz Jacobin Club, the Austrian Chancellor and eponym of the Metternich system Klemens von Metternich could still say of Mainz: “Mainz is a terrible nest of Jacobins.”

== Counter-revolutionary Publications on the Mainz Jacobin Club ==
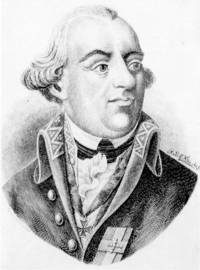
Portrait of the Electoral Mainz statesman and general of artillery Franz Joseph von Albini

Contemporary perceptions of the Mainz Jacobin Club by counter-revolutionary forces were generally synonymous with those directed toward the Mainz Jacobins themselves and were often tied to the broader context of the Republic of Mainz. Conservative actors throughout the Holy Roman Empire began developing a form of “counter-revolutionary journalism,” which was strongly personalized and frequently targeted leading Jacobins of the Mainz Club directly.

These individuals were accused of treason, ingratitude, and a lack of moral integrity. The surrender of the powerful Imperial fortress of Mainz to the French without resistance, according to the prevailing tone of this literature, could only be explained by treason. In this context, Rudolf Eickemeyer was singled out in his role as a member of the Military Council and as the chief negotiator of the capitulation with Custine. Georg Wedekind was accused of having revealed the plans of the Mainz fortress works during a visit by Custine to Nierstein.

The most widespread accusation of ingratitude toward the Electoral Mainz patron was directed at scholars such as Georg Forster or Mathias Metternich, the latter having arrived in Mainz without financial means. Georg Forster was described in 1793 by Franz Joseph von Albini, writing under the pseudonym Gottlob Teutsch, who served as Electoral Mainz court chancellor and minister, as a “true parasitic plant on Mainz soil”.

Accusations of immorality and improper conduct were especially directed at revolutionary-minded and highly visible clerics such as Anton Joseph Dorsch or Felix Anton Blau, partly because they had violated the obligation of celibacy. Among the still conservative and strongly Catholic population of Mainz and Rhenish Hesse, these accusations—often voyeuristic, exaggerated, and sensationalized—gained considerable traction and weakened above all the political standing of Dorsch.

Another recurring theme of counter-revolutionary publications was confessional prejudice, which also found broad acceptance among the Catholic populace. Georg Forster and Georg Wedekind, both Protestants and leading figures of the Mainz Jacobin Club, were prominent targets. One anti-revolutionary pamphlet summarized this sentiment with the statement: “To be a stranger and a Protestant—that was the best recommendation at court!”

More subtle and indirect were accusations that the revolutionary enthusiasm in Mainz had been driven primarily by intellectuals—mostly outsiders—above all professors and students at the Electoral Mainz University. These individuals, it was claimed, had not only deceived the elector who supported them but, as foreigners, had no genuine interest in Mainz or the welfare of its inhabitants. Conservative publicists effectively exploited the latent Xenophobia prevalent in late 18th-century Mainz as well as the social resentment felt by the working-class population toward these recently well-supported academic outsiders.

A large number of counter-revolutionary leaflets circulated especially in rural areas, spreading unease among the rural population. Peasants were threatened with the future loss of their property should they collaborate with the French or the Jacobins, a threat that proved effective when combined with the increasingly harsh measures of the French military leadership and its soldiers during the requisitioning of food supplies.

== Reception ==
The extensive counter-publications produced by conservative forces in the Holy Roman Empire against the leading Jacobins of the Mainz Jacobin Club in the years 1792 and 1793 were characterized by Franz Dumont as involving “a high degree of defamation, even demonization of opponents,” as well as “polemical exaggerations.” The designation of individuals as “clubists” became a widely used and exclusively pejorative expression. Following revolutionary propaganda methods, pamphlets and printed writings of all kinds were used, distributed generously and in large quantities among the population, including on the left bank of the Rhine.

After the end of the Republic of Mainz and the club, these activities quickly ceased. Not until the mid-19th century and some time after the German revolutions of 1848–1849 did scholars once again engage with this chapter of Mainz and broader German–French history. In German historiography, for almost 100 years, critical voices on the Republic of Mainz and its protagonists, the Mainz Jacobins, predominated. In the context of the Franco-German enmity, keywords such as “French domination,” “French sympathizing,” or “clubistery” often dominated regional historical publications. Mainz historians such as Karl Klein, who in his 1861 work *Geschichte von Mainz während der ersten französischen Okkupation 1792–1793* wrote about the time when “our land fell into the hands of the hereditary enemy,” or Karl Georg Bockenheimer with his 1896 publication *Die Mainzer Klubisten der Jahre 1792 und 1793*, may be cited here.

As an example of the broader, negatively charged assessment of the Mainz Jacobins, one may refer to the formulation used by Heinrich von Treitschke in his *German History in the Nineteenth Century*, reducing the Jacobins to “a handful of noisy hotheads,” who moreover committed treason.

The stages of Franco-German relations between 1850 and 1945, and especially the close interconnection of Mainz and the left-bank Rhine region with France after the First World War (Allied occupation of the Rhineland, Rhenish Republic), continued to shape perceptions, repeatedly reviving negative parallels to the Republic of Mainz rooted in counter-revolutionary views. An exception was the four-volume work *Quellen und Geschichte des Rheinlands im Zeitalter der Französischen Revolution* by Joseph Hansen, published from 1931 onward, which in its second volume also drew on other sources on the Republic of Mainz.

Even after the Second World War, the image of the Republic of Mainz and its protagonists, the “clubists,” remained predominantly negative both in historiography and among conservative historians. In the former case, the revolutionary-historical episode of the short-lived Republic of Mainz and its institution, the Jacobin Club, was regarded as insignificant and therefore unworthy of mention. Leading Jacobins in Mainz were still described with the traditional pejorative attributes of the counter-revolution, for example by Helmut Mathy, who in 1967 described Anton Joseph Dorsch in *Anton Joseph Dorsch (1758–1819). Leben und Werk eines rheinischen Jakobiners* as “obstinate and selfish in character,” while others were simply ignored in historical scholarship.

Only from the early 1970s did the Mainz Jacobin Club and its members become a serious subject of research. In the GDR, scholars had already turned to the topic in the 1960s for political-ideological reasons. Their work culminated in the three-volume study by Heinrich Scheel, *Die Mainzer Republik*, whose second volume deals extensively with the minutes of the meetings of the Mainz Jacobin Club. Today, there is broad consensus among historians that Scheel’s source work, particularly in this area, is exemplary, although many of his conclusions are considered outdated due to the political–ideological orientation of his work.

Prompted by intellectual circles within social democracy and the labor movement, and by figures such as Federal President Gustav Heinemann, who called for an investigation into the roots of German democratism, scholars after 1968—supported by a new and less conservative generation of historians—reengaged with the topic, this time from a more social-liberal and labor-history perspective. These new studies often stood in contrast to the classically oriented established scholarship.

Another foundational work on the subject is the book by Franz Dumont, *Die Mainzer Republik von 1792/93*, first published in 1982 and revised and reissued in 1992. Dumont analyzes, among other things, the Mainz Jacobin Club, its composition, and its political activities. For him, the Mainz Jacobin Club and its activists were “the undisputed center of all efforts to introduce democracy” and, in the process of political mobilization initiated by the French among their new subjects, “the supporting and shaping, at times also the driving forces.” Dumont also attributes to the Mainz Jacobin Club a significance—hardly disputed by historians at the end of the 20th century—as the first organized group of German democrats and a precursor of a political party.

However, the Mainz Jacobin Club failed as a representative of the “common people” or the “working masses.” The reasons included the disparity between the small but politically leading group of intellectuals and the much larger, but politically inactive, group of artisans. Among the rural population, support for the club was virtually nonexistent: only 2%—fewer than ten members—of the total membership came from the peasantry.

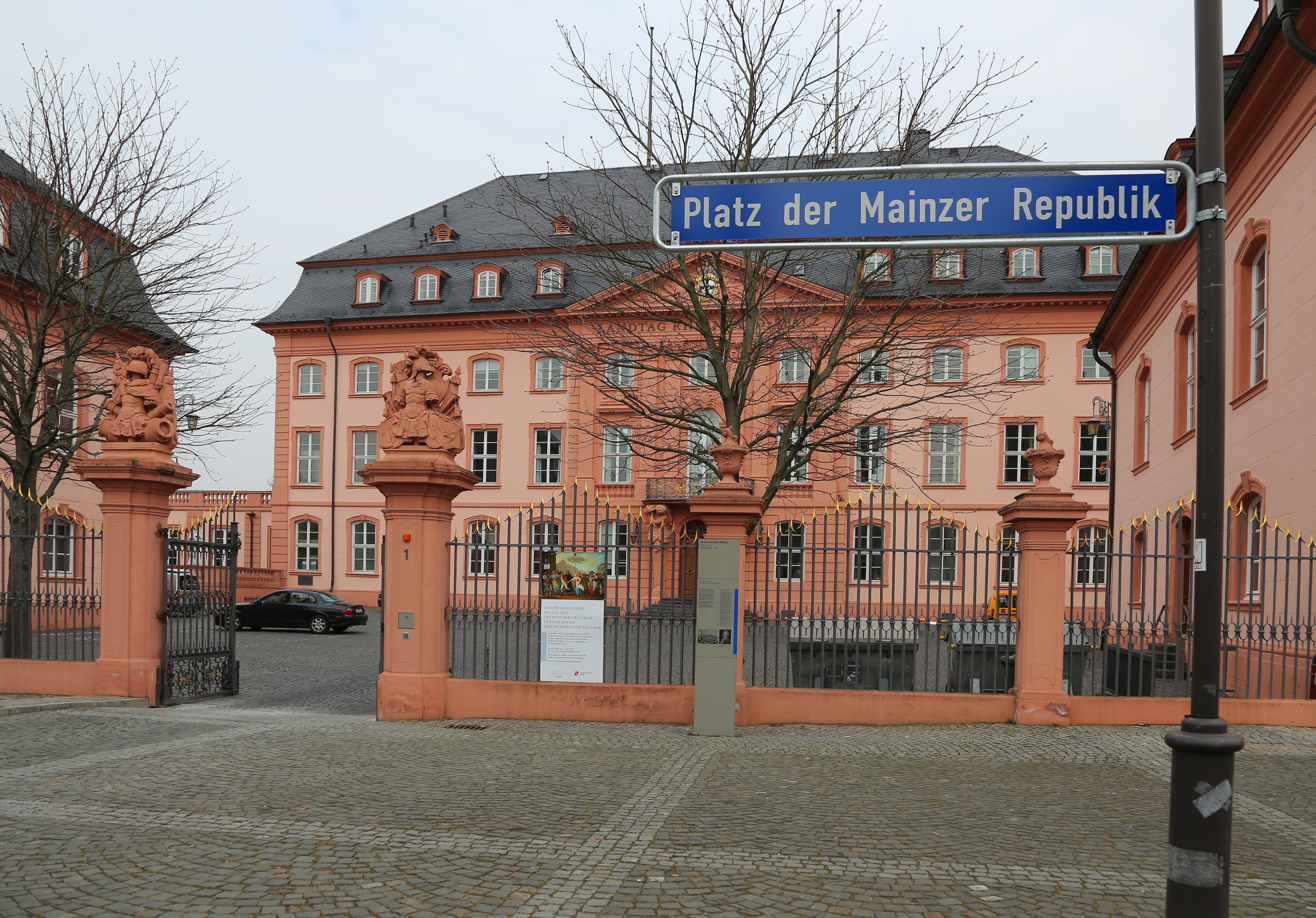
“Place of the Republic of Mainz”

The Republic of Mainz and its protagonists again became a significant topic of discussion in 2013. Ahead of the 220th anniversary of the proclamation of the Republic of Mainz on 17 March, the Mainz Altstadt district council submitted a proposal to rename Deutschhausplatz as “Platz der Mainzer Republik.” The motion sparked partially controversial debate in the public sphere, with renewed discussion of the legitimacy and understanding of democracy associated with the Republic of Mainz and its founders, the Mainz Jacobins. After the Mainz city council approved the renaming by majority vote, it was carried out on 17 March 2013—exactly 220 years after the proclamation of the Republic of Mainz at the same location.

Franz Dumont was a prominent supporter of the renaming and shortly before his death published a detailed statement in the local Mainz press on the issue.

== Bibliography ==
- Heinz Boberach: Deutsche Jakobiner. Mainzer Republik und Cisrhenanen 1792–1798. Vol. 1: Handbuch. Beiträge zur demokratischen Tradition in Deutschland. 2nd ed. Hesse, Mainz 1982.
- Franz Dumont: Die Mainzer Republik von 1792/93. Studien zur Revolutionierung in Rheinhessen und der Pfalz (= Alzeyer Geschichtsblätter. Sonderheft 9). 2nd, expanded ed. Verlag der Rheinhessischen Druckwerkstätte, Alzey 1993. ISBN 3-87854-090-6.
- Joseph Hansen: Quellen und Geschichte des Rheinlands im Zeitalter der Französischen Revolution 1780–1801. Vol. 2, 1792–1793. Droste Verlag, Düsseldorf 1933; reprint of Hanstein Verlag, Bonn 1933; 2004. ISBN 3-7700-7619-2.
- Heinrich Scheel (ed.): Die Mainzer Republik. Vol. 1: Protokolle des Jakobinerklubs (= Schriften des Zentralinstituts für Geschichte, Vol. 42, ISSN 0138-3566). 2nd, revised and expanded ed. Akademie-Verlag, Berlin 1984.
- Heinz Boberach: Deutsche Jakobiner. Mainzer Republik und Cisrhenanen 1792–1798. Vol. 1: Handbuch. Beiträge zur demokratischen Tradition in Deutschland. 2nd ed. Hesse, Mainz 1982.
- Franz Dumont: Mayence. Das französische Mainz (1792/98–1814). In: Franz Dumont, Ferdinand Scherf, Friedrich Schütz (eds.): Mainz. Die Geschichte der Stadt. 2nd ed. Philipp von Zabern, Mainz 1999. ISBN 3-8053-2000-0. pp. 319–374.
- Franz Dumont: Die Mainzer Republik von 1792/93. Studien zur Revolutionierung in Rheinhessen und der Pfalz. 2nd, expanded ed. Verlag der Rheinhessischen Druckwerkstätte, Alzey 1993. ISBN 3-87854-090-6 (= Alzeyer Geschichtsblätter, Sonderheft 9).
- Franz Dumont: Die Mainzer Republik 1792/93. Französischer Revolutionsexport und deutscher Demokratieversuch. Präsident des Landtags Rheinland-Pfalz, Mainz 2013. ISBN 978-3-9811001-3-6 (= Schriftenreihe des Landtags Rheinland-Pfalz, Heft 55).
- Walter Grab: Eroberung oder Befreiung? Deutsche Jakobiner und die Franzosenherrschaft im Rheinland 1792 bis 1799. In: Archiv für Sozialgeschichte, Vol. 10 (1970), ISSN 0066-6505, pp. 7–94 (= Schriften aus dem Karl-Marx-Haus, Vol. 4, ZDB-ID 517447-8). Karl-Marx-Haus, Trier 1971; also special reprint: Verlag für Literatur und Zeitgeschehen, Hannover 1970; also: .
- Heinrich Scheel (ed.): Die Mainzer Republik. Vol. 1: Protokolle des Jakobinerklubs. 2nd, revised and expanded ed. Akademie-Verlag, Berlin 1984 (= Schriften des Zentralinstituts für Geschichte, Vol. 42, ISSN 0138-3566).
- Jörg Schweigard: Die Liebe zur Freiheit ruft uns an den Rhein. Aufklärung, Reform und Revolution in Mainz. Casimir Katz, Gernsheim 2005. ISBN 3-925825-89-4.
- Verein für Sozialgeschichte (ed.): Rund um den Freiheitsbaum. 200 Jahre Mainzer Republik. Verein für Sozialgeschichte, Mainz 1993 (= Mainzer Geschichtsblätter, Heft 8, ISSN 0178-5761).
- Bernd Blisch, Hans-Jürgen Bömelburg: 200 Jahre Mainzer Republik. Von den Schwierigkeiten des Umgangs mit einer sperrigen Vergangenheit. pp. 7–29.
