= Mathias Metternich =

German mathematician

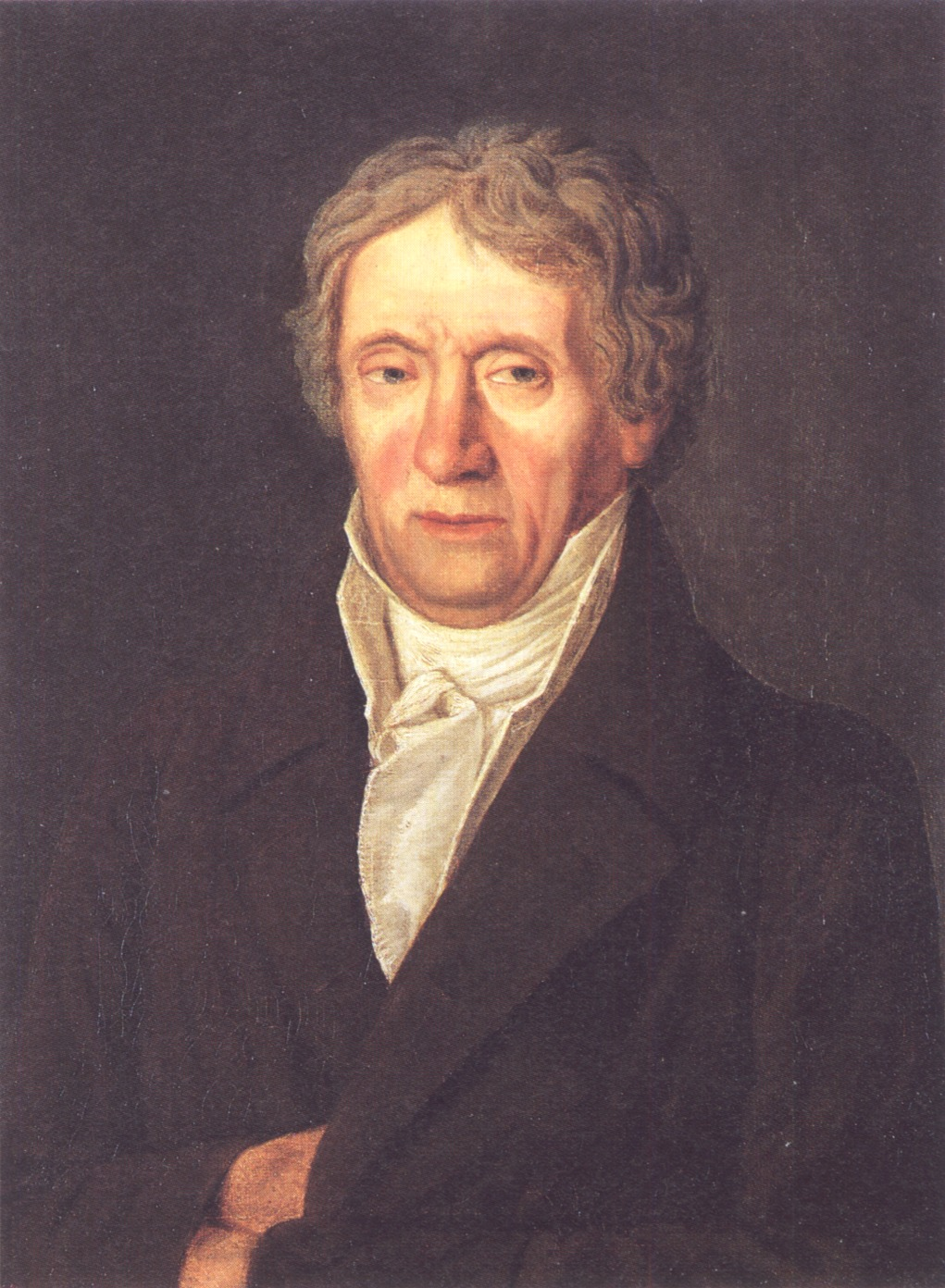
- Born: 8 May 1747; Steinefrenz, Electorate of Trier
- Died: 13 September 1825 (aged 78); Mainz
- Education: University of Mainz; University of Göttingen; University of Erfurt
- Occupations: Mathematician; Revolutionary
- Spouse: Sophie Friederike Treffz (m. 1808)

Mathias Metternich (8 May 1747 – 13 September 1825) was a German mathematician and professor at the University of Mainz. As a revolutionary, he was active in the Republic of Mainz.

== Early life and education ==
Metternich was born on 8 May 1747 in Steinefrenz, a village in the Electorate of Trier close to Montabaur. He was born into a family of farmers who had lived in the area since the 17th century. Locally, the Metternich family was influential and respected; both his father and grandfather held the office of Heimberger, the village leader. Supported by a nobleman, the count of Waldersdorff, Metternich was able to study at the Jesuit gymnasium in Hadamar. In 1770, he went to Mainz, where he was educated as an elementary school teacher at the normal school. He became a teacher at the school of the St Emmeran's Church, Mainz and in 1780 at the normal school. He also studied mathematics at the University of Mainz from 1780 and at the University of Göttingen from 1784, where he studied with Abraham Gotthelf Kästner. In 1786, he obtained a doctorate in philosophy from the University of Erfurt, with a thesis about friction. Between 1782 and 1785, he was a member of the Illuminati in Mainz with the secret name Thiusco.

== Professor and revolutionary ==
Metternich became professor of mathematics and experimental physics in Mainz in 1786. He also became a member of the Churfürstlich Mayntzische Academie nützlicher Wissenschaften, the academy of applied sciences in Erfurt. In 1789, his work about friction won a prize from the Societas Jablonoviana in Leipzig. He was a member of the Mainzer Gelehrte Lesegesellschaft, a reading society, and openly supported the French Revolution. In 1791, Metternich and his colleague Andreas Joseph Hofmann initiated a split in the reading society, which separated into a democratic and an aristocratic part.

In the Republic of Mainz that supported revolutionary France, he was one of the founding members of the Jacobin Club and at times its president. After Mainz was taken by Prussian and other troops after the 1793 Siege of Mainz, Metternich was captured and mistreated, then imprisoned at Ehrenbreitstein Fortress and exiled to France in 1795. He worked as an administrator and journalist in French occupied territories, but was captured by imperial German troops again in October 1796, spending time in prison until he was released in April 1797 owing to the Treaty of Leoben.

== Later life ==
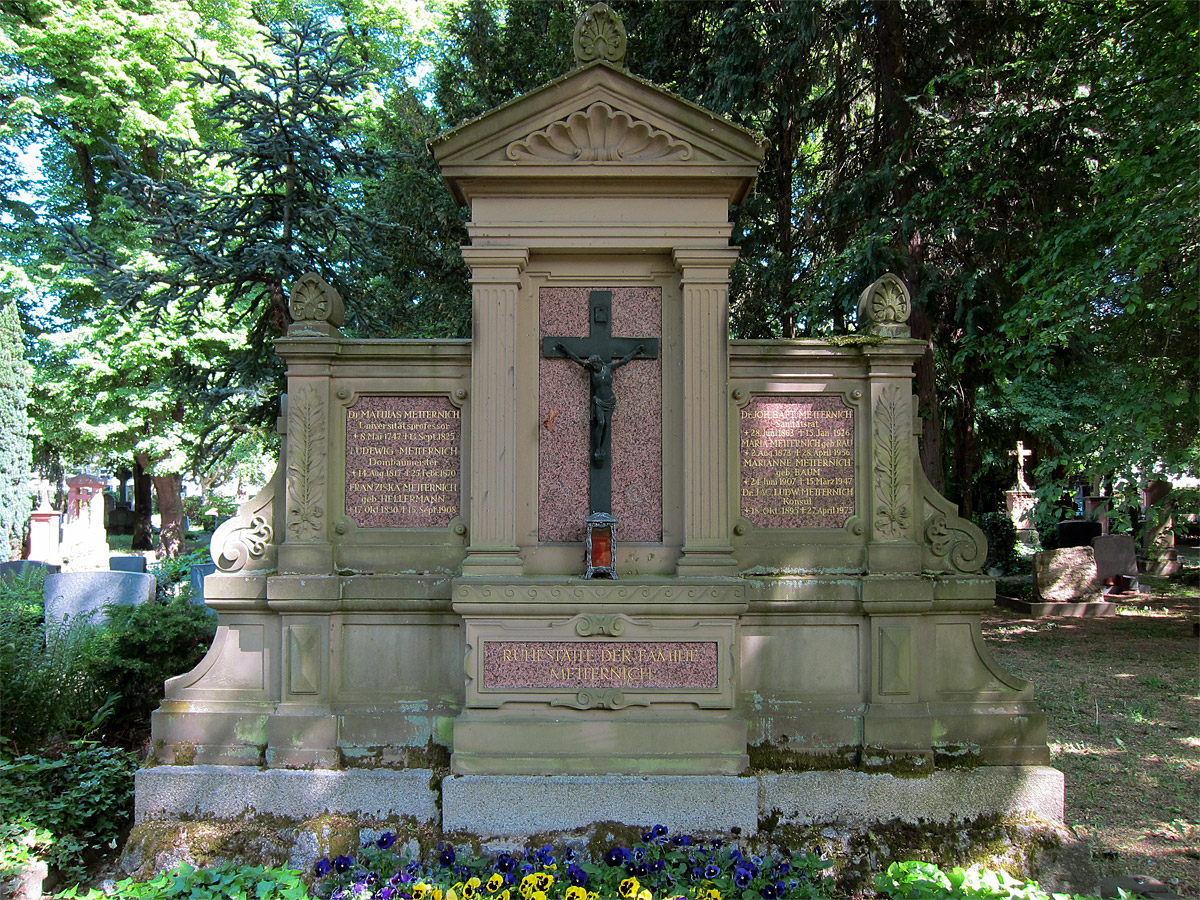
Metternich family tomb at the Mainz Central Cemetery

In 1798, Metternich returned to Mainz and became a teacher at the Zentralschule, a successor organisation of the university. Until 1800, he also worked in the administration of the département Mont-Tonnerre. He ceased his political activity in the Napoleonic era. In 1808, Metternich married Sophie Friederike Treffz. One of their children was Germain Metternich, who became a participant in the German revolutions of 1848–1849. Metternich died in Mainz on 13 September 1825.

== Bibliography ==
- Cantor, Moritz (1885). "Metternich, Matthias" . Allgemeine Deutsche Biographie (in German). Vol. 21. Leipzig: Duncker & Humblot. p. 527.
- Kreutz, Wilhelm (1991). "Die Illuminaten des rheinisch-pfälzischen Raums und anderer außerbayerischer Territorien. Eine 'wiederentdeckte' Quelle zur Ausbreitung des radikal aufklärerischen Geheimordens in den Jahren 1781 und 1782". Francia (in German). 18 (2): 115–149. doi:10.11588/fr.1991.2.56842. ISSN 2569-5452.
- Keller, Mario (1988). Rund um den Freiheitsbaum. Moralische Ökonomie. Frankfurt (Main): Materialis-Verlag. ISBN 978-3-88535-118-4.
- Lachenicht, Susanne (2004). Information und Propaganda. Die Presse deutscher Jakobiner im Elsaß (1791-1800) (Reprint 2014 ed.). Berlin/Boston: R. Oldenbourg. ISBN 978-3-486-83528-1. OCLC 922668747.
- Metternich, Matthias (1786). Dissertatio Inavgvralis Physico-Mathematica De Frictione. Erfordiae: Nonne.
- Metternich, Matthias (1789). Von dem Widerstande der Reibung (in German).
- Scheel, Heinrich (2019). Die Mainzer Republik 3 : Die erste bürgerlich-demokratische Republik auf deutschem Boden. München: De Gruyter Oldenbourg. ISBN 978-3-11-066105-7. OCLC 1102794895.
- Schubring, Gert (1995). "Differences in the involvement of mathematicians in the political life in France and in Germany". Bollettino di storia delle scienze matematiche. 15 (1): 61–83. ISSN 0392-4432. MR 1397346.
- Schubring, Gert (2005). Conflicts between generalization, rigor, and intuition : number concepts underlying the development of analysis in 17th–19th century France and Germany. New York: Springer. ISBN 978-0-387-22836-5. OCLC 76822576.
- Schubring, Gert (2019). "The Impact of Teaching Mathematics Upon the Development of Mathematical Practices". Interfaces between Mathematical Practices and Mathematical Education. Cham: Springer International Publishing. pp. 123–141. doi:10.1007/978-3-030-01617-3_5. ISBN 978-3-030-01617-3.
- Schubring, Gert (2021). Geschichte der Mathematik in ihren Kontexten: neue Zugänge. Mathematik Kompakt. Cham, Switzerland: Birkhäuser. ISBN 978-3-030-69483-8.
- Schubring, Gert (2023). Analysing historical mathematics textbooks. International Studies in the History of Mathematics and Its Teaching. Cham: Springer Nature. ISBN 978-3-031-17670-8.
- Schweigard, Jörg (2005). Die Liebe zur Freiheit ruft uns an den Rhein: Aufklärung, Reform und Revolution in Mainz (in German). Katz. ISBN 978-3-925825-89-7.
- Smorynski, Craig (2017). MVT: A Most Valuable Theorem (1st ed. 2017 ed.). Cham: Springer International Publishing : Imprint: Springer. ISBN 978-3-319-52956-1.
