= Deutschhaus Mainz =

Historical building in Mainz, Germany

Coordinates: 50°00′19″N 8°16′18″E

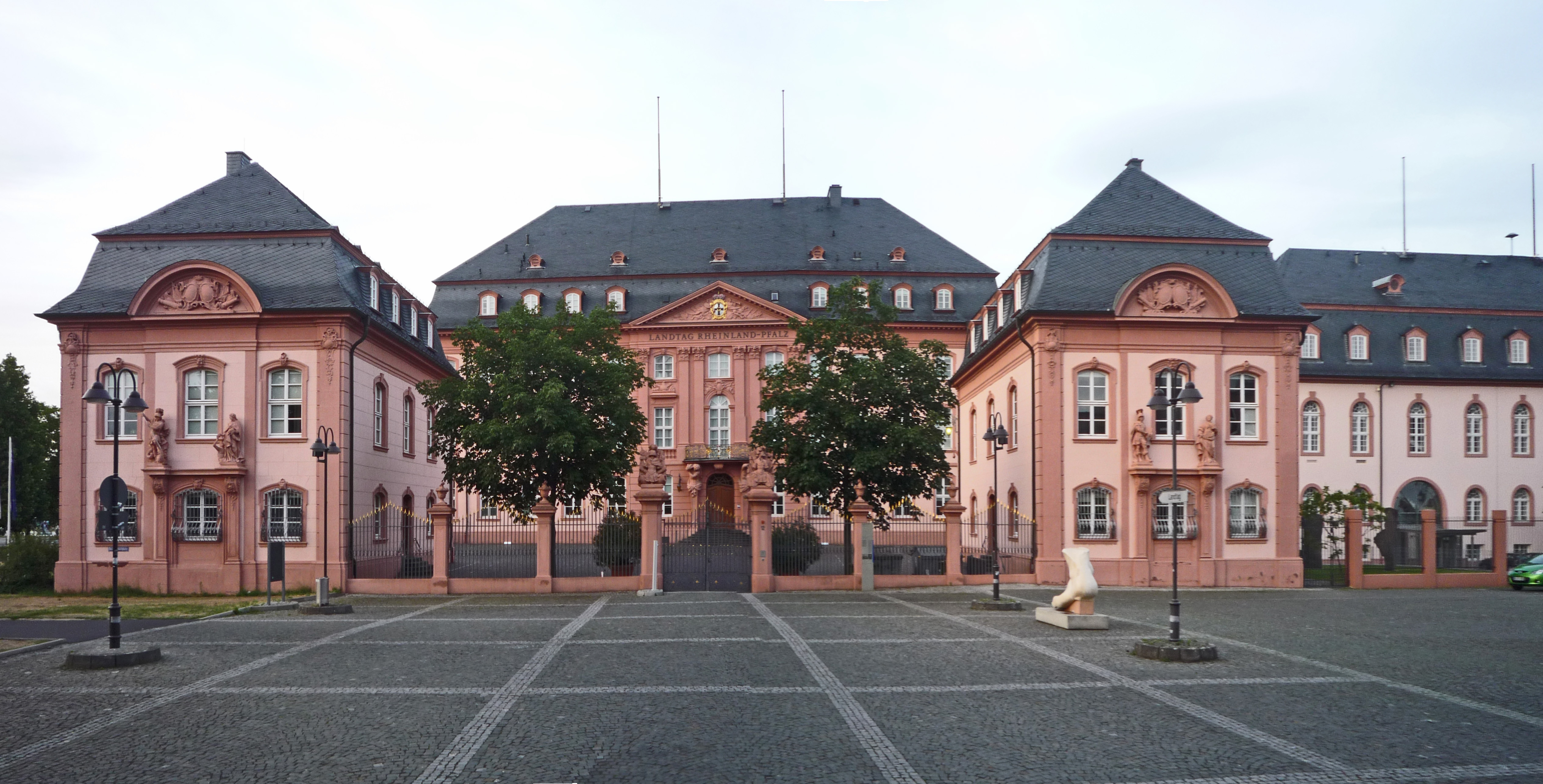
Deutschhaus – Regional-Parliament of Rhineland-Palatinate – view from the city (Deutschhausplatz)

The Deutschhaus or Deutschordenskommende (German for "Commandry of the Teutonic Knights") is a historical building in Mainz, western Germany, which is the seat of the Landtag of Rhineland-Palatinate.

== History ==
The Baroque palace was built from 1729 to 1740 for Francis Louis of Neuburg, Prince-elector and Archbishop of Mainz from 1729 to 1732. Since he was at the same time Hochmeister of the Teutonic Knights, he built the Deutschhaus as his second residence for representative purposes in his duties as Hochmeister in the immediate neighborhood of the Electoral Palace, his other residence.

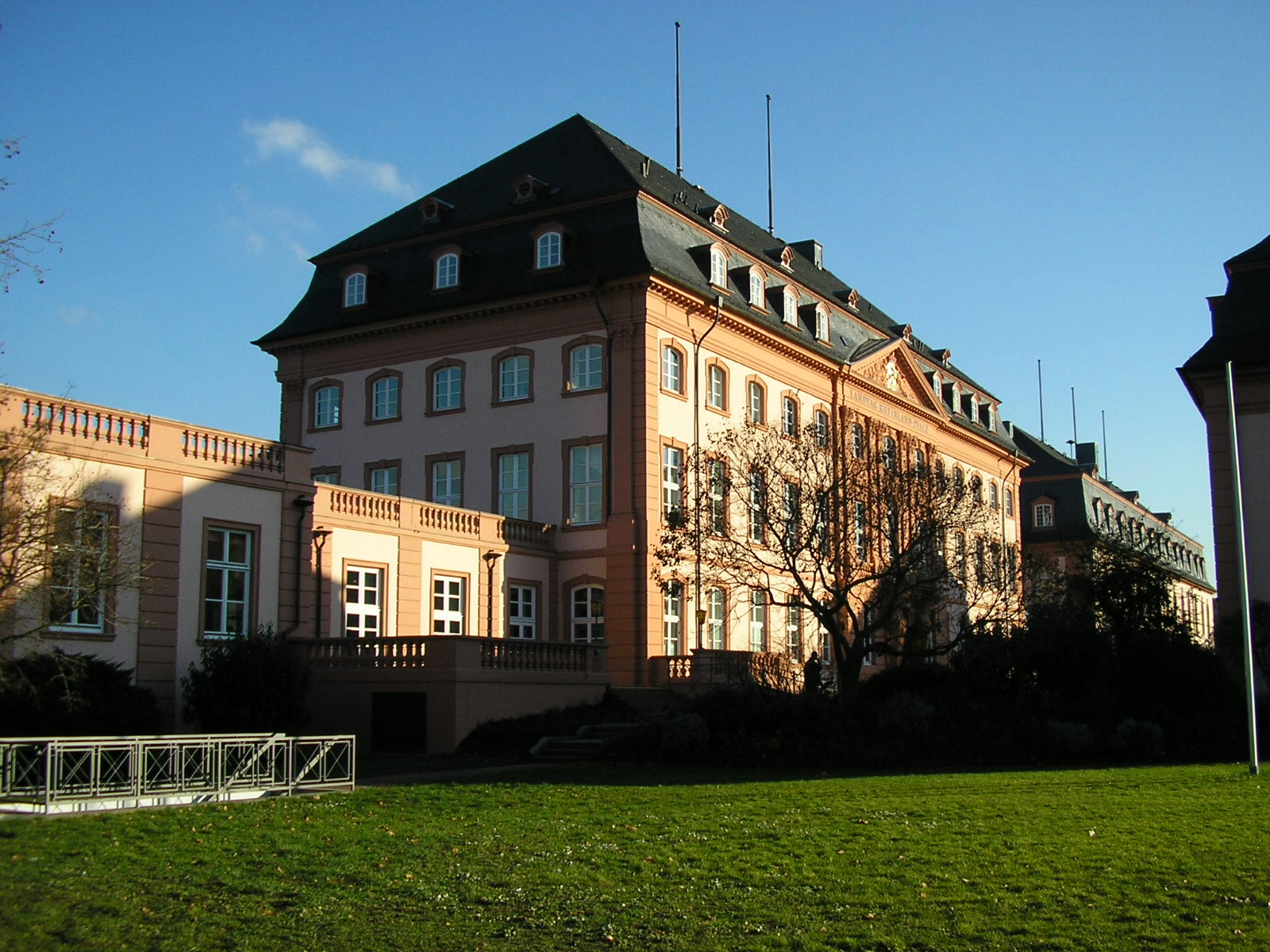
View from the Rhine side

The building was constructed by Anselm Franz Freiherr von Ritter zu Groenesteyn in a style influenced by French Baroque architecture. It consists of a main building and two pavilions around a central court. One of the pavilions contained a chapel with frescoes by Christoph Thomas Scheffler. Due to the Hochmeister's death in 1732, the building was never used for its intended function as Hochmeister's residence.

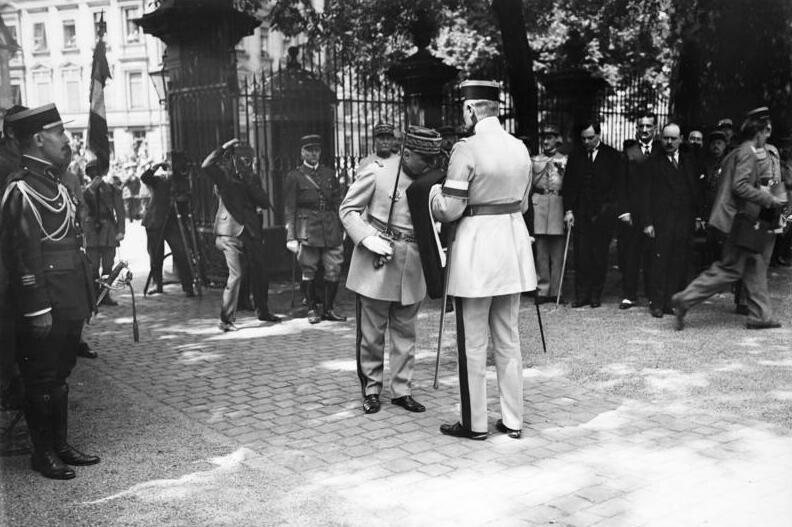
General Adolphe Guillaumat with the French flag in front of the building at the end of the Occupation of the Rhineland in June 1930

In the times of French occupation leading to the establishment of the Republic of Mainz, it became the seat of the Rhenish-German National Convention. This earliest democratically elected parliament in Germany first met on March 17, 1793 in the Deutschhaus. On the next day, the Convention declared Mainz and all of the territory between Landau and Bingen to be an independent state based on the principles of liberty and egality, and the Convention's president Andreas Joseph Hofmann proclaimed the Rhenish-German Free State (Rheinisch-Deutscher Freistaat) from the balcony of the Deutschhaus. After this period had ended with the French capitulation after the Siege of Mainz on July 23, 1793, the building was used by Archduke Charles, Duke of Teschen until the territory was ceded to France again in the Treaty of Campo Formio, and the Deutschhaus became the administrative seat of the French département Mont-Tonnerre. It was used as a palace by Napoleon during all of his 9 stays in Mainz, who planned to double the size of the building and use it as an imperial residence, as Mayence was intended to become one of the bonnes villes de l'Empire, the 36 most important cities of France. In the aftermath of the Napoleonic Wars, the building was used by the Dukes of Hesse-Darmstadt, who obtained the territory of Mainz after the Congress of Vienna. In 1870, the building served as the headquarters of the Prussian army in the early stages of the Franco-Prussian War.

During World War II, the building was heavily damaged, especially in the air raid of February 27, 1945, which destroyed most of the city. Of the Deutschhaus, only the exterior walls remained.

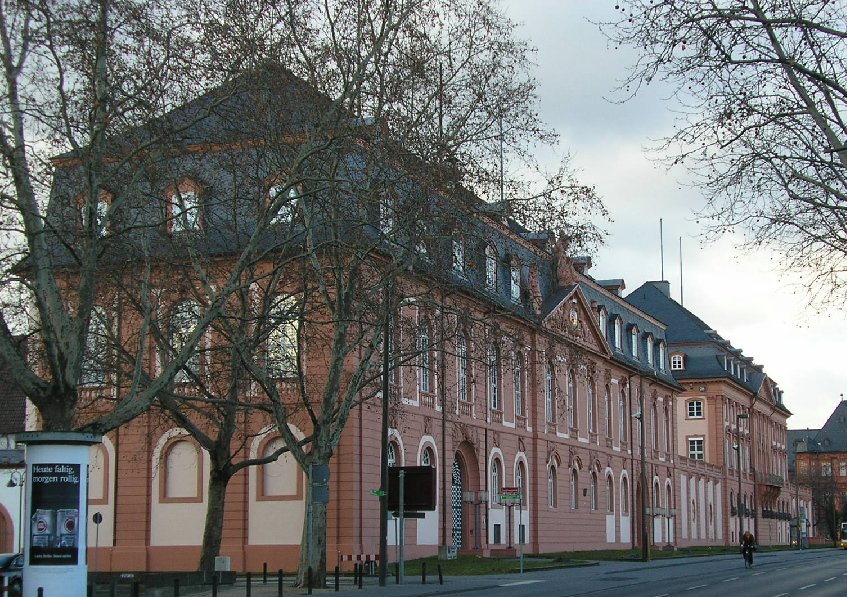
The Deutschhaus can be seen at the right of the Neues Zeughaus, the seat of the Minister-President of Rhineland-Palatinate

Reconstruction started after the Rhineland-Palatinate Landtag decided to move from Koblenz to Mainz on May 28, 1950. It was completed in 1951, and the new building was used for the first time for the constituting session of the newly elected Landtag on May 18, 1951. It has been used as plenary building of the Landtag ever since. As the Deutschhaus has only very limited office space for the members of parliament, a new office building for them was constructed in 1999.

== Sources ==
- (in German) History of the Deutschhaus at the Rhineland-Palatinate Landtag website
- "Das Deutschhaus 1945–1951" (in German)., published by the Rhineland-Palatinate Landtag, includes many pictures of destruction and reconstruction
- (in German) Parliamentary office building
- "Frankreich und Mainz" (PDF) (in German). (250 KiB), in: Blätter zum Land 3/2001, published by the Landeszentrale für politische Bildung Rheinland-Pfalz
