= Andreas Joseph Hofmann =

German philosopher (1752–1849)

Chairman of the Rhenish-German National Convention
- In office 1793

Personal details
- Born: 14 July 1752 Zell am Main, Prince-Bishopric of Würzburg, Holy Roman Empire
- Died: 6 September 1849 (aged 97) Winkel, Duchy of Nassau, German Empire
- Occupation: Philosopher and revolutionary
- Known for: Proclamation of the Republic of Mainz

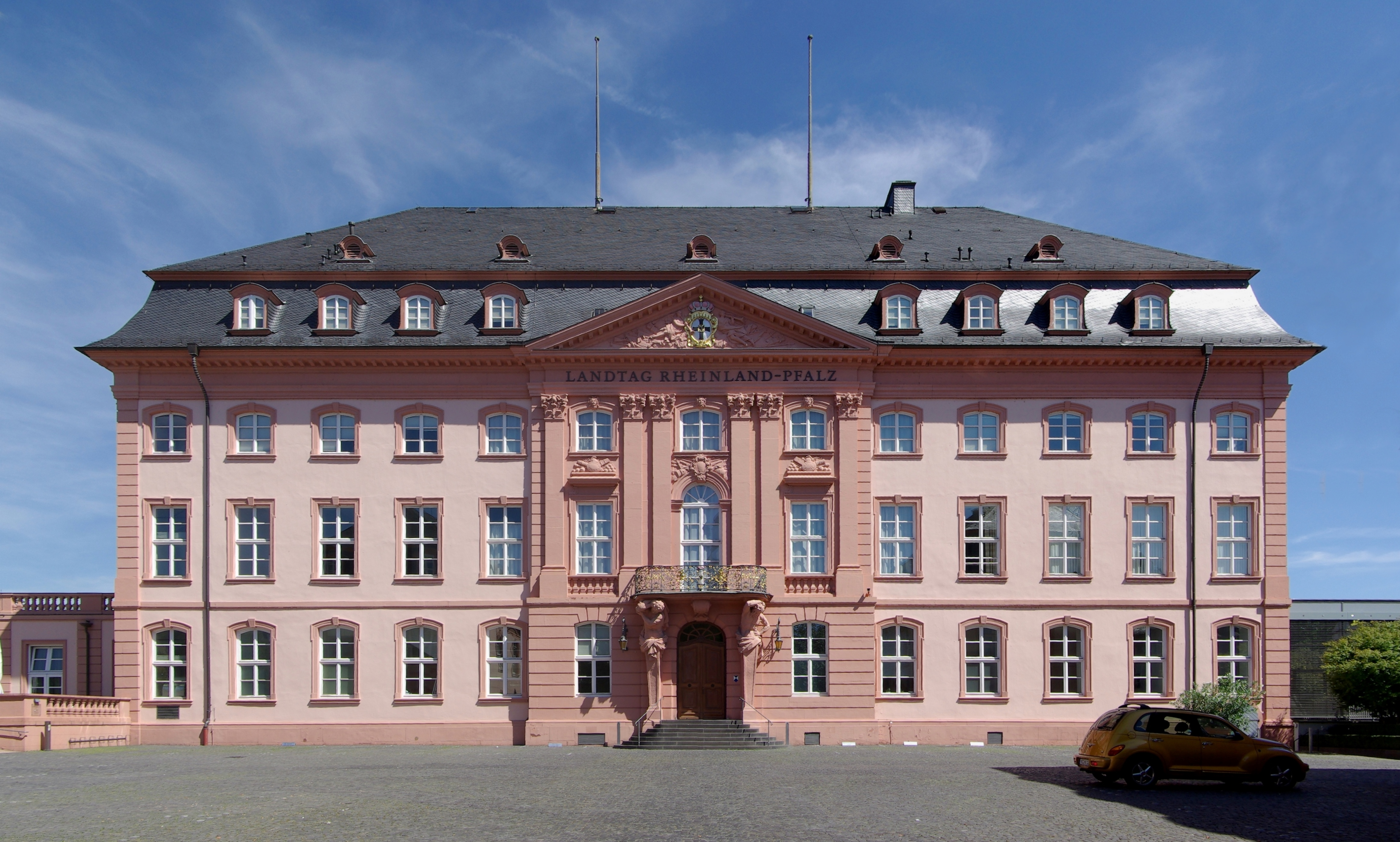
The Deutschhaus building in Mainz, where Hofmann proclaimed the republic, now seat of the Landtag of Rhineland-Palatinate

Andreas Joseph Hofmann (14 July 1752 – 6 September 1849) was a German philosopher and revolutionary active in the Republic of Mainz. As Chairman of the Rhenish-German National Convention, the earliest parliament in Germany based on the principle of popular sovereignty, he proclaimed the first republican state in Germany, the Rhenish-German Free State, on 18 March 1793. A strong supporter of the French Revolution, he argued for an accession of all German territory west of the Rhine to France and served in the administration of the department Mont-Tonnerre under the French Directory and the French Consulate.

== Early life and education ==
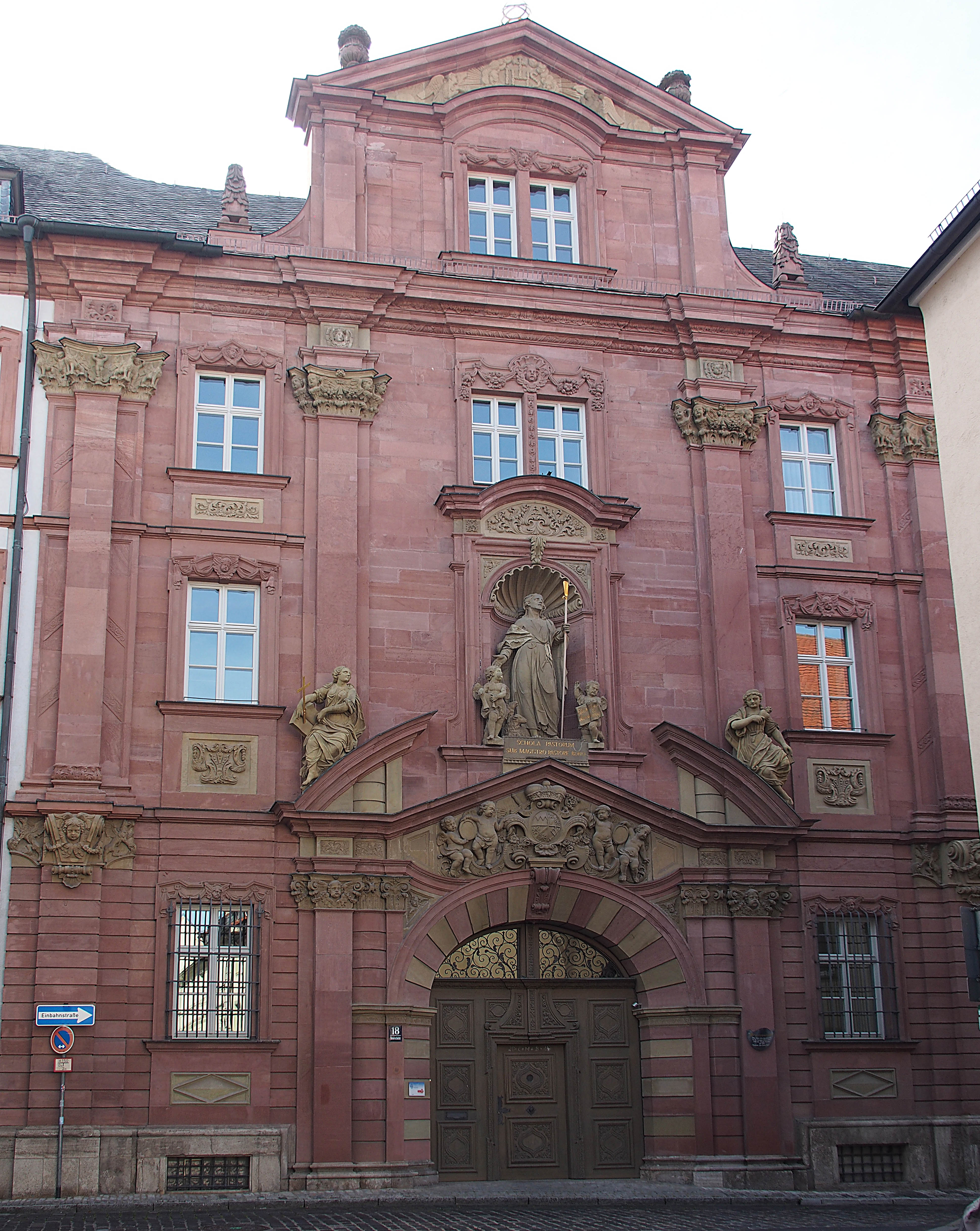
Former Jesuit college in Würzburg, now the Catholic seminary

Hofmann was born in Zell am Main near Würzburg as the son of a surgeon. After the early death of his parents, he was educated by his uncle Fahrmann, likely Andreas Joseph Fahrmann (1742–1802), (Note: Many sources claim that the uncle's name was "Franz Xaver Fahrmann", following Otto, but the only person matching either of the descriptions as professor of moral theology or of auxiliary bishop in Würzburg during the time in question is Andreas Joseph Fahrmann (1742–1802), see also the list of auxiliary bishops of Würzburg. Otto's reference for Fahrmann is Franz Xaver von Wegele's history of the University of Würzburg, which does not give Fahrmann's first name. In Hofmanns CV for his application for the position in Mainz, he mentions an uncle Professor Fahrmann without first name. The Mainz University historian Helmut Mathy presents the uncle's name as Franz Xaver Fahrmann, but cites the Allgemeine Deutsche Biographie article about Andreas Joseph Fahrmann for details about Fahrmann's life.) professor of moral theology at the University of Würzburg and later auxiliary bishop in the Diocese of Würzburg. After a one-year course in poetics and rhetoric at the Würzburg Jesuit college, Hofmann studied law at the University of Mainz and at the University of Würzburg. In 1777 he moved to Vienna to gain experience at the Reichshofrat or Aulic Council, one of the supreme courts of the Holy Roman Empire and became a Privatdozent in 1778. In Vienna, Hofmann was influenced by the enlightened principles of Josephinism. Besides philosophical publications such as Ueber das Studium der philosophischen Geschichte (About the study of the history of philosophy), where Hofmann argued for the introduction of the history of philosophy as a subject in the Universities in Austria, following the example of Würzburg, he started writing articles for various journals and founded a theatre journal in 1781. His satirical articles caused conflict with the authorities, and instead of being given a position at the newly re-founded University of Lviv as had been originally envisioned, he was forced to leave Austria. He returned to Würzburg in 1783, and was soon after employed by the Prince of Hohenzollern-Hechingen.

== Professor and revolutionary in Mainz ==
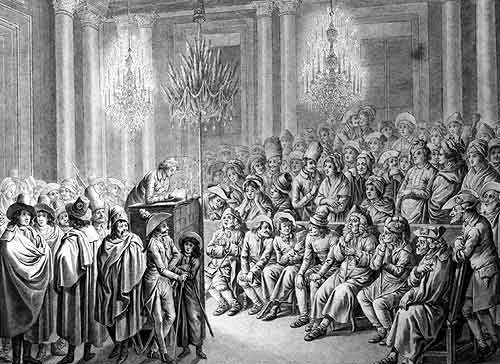
The Mainz Jacobin club in 1792, by Johann Jacob Hoch

In 1784, Hofmann was made Chair of Philosophy in Mainz as part of the progressive reforms of Elector Friedrich Karl von Erthal that had made the University of Mainz one of the centres of Catholic Enlightenment. Like many other future members of the Jacobin Club of Mainz, he was a member of the secret society of the Illuminati (under the name Aulus Persius) but the Illuminati were outlawed in 1785 and the lodge dissolved soon after. Hofmann first taught History of Philosophy until 1791, when he also became chair of natural law. Besides philosophy and law, Hofmann also was talented in languages. He was proficient in Latin, Ancient Greek, French, Italian, and English, and offered classes in English on Alexander Pope over many years. Among his students were Klemens von Metternich, who later became Chancellor of State of the Austrian Empire and the architect of the reactionary European Restoration, and Johann Adam von Itzstein, who became a leading liberal politician and member of the 1848 Frankfurt Parliament. As a liberal and progressive thinker, Hofmann supported the use of German instead of Latin in University lectures and in church. Eventually he became disillusioned with the pace of the reforms in Mainz and welcomed the French Revolution from the start. As Hofmann declared his support of the ideas of the French Revolution openly in his lectures, he was soon spied on by the increasingly reactionary Mainz authorities, who had outlawed all criticism of state and religion on 10 September 1792. However, before the investigation of his activities had progressed beyond the questioning of his students, the archbishop and his court fled from the advancing French troops under General Custine, who arrived in Mainz on 21 October 1792.

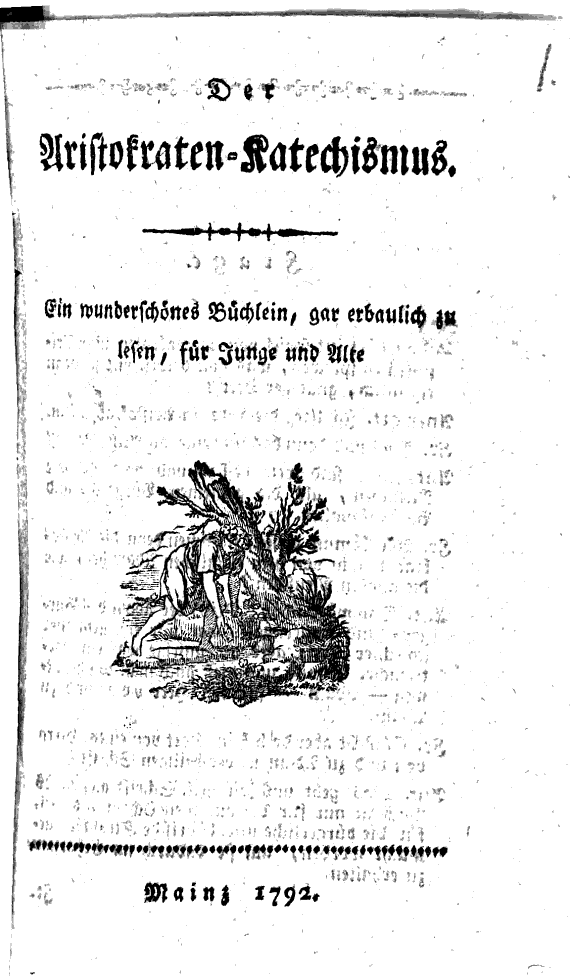
Title page of Der Aristokraten-Katechismus, published 1792

Two days later, Hofmann helped found the Mainz Jacobin club and became one of its most active members. A popular and powerful orator, he criticised both the old regime of the Elector and the French military government in his speeches, which were especially supported by the more radical students who idolised the incorruptible Hofmann. In late 1792, he published the Aristokraten-Katechismus, a revolutionary pamphlet criticising the old regime and its instrumentalisation of religion to protect the absolutist order. Hofmann and his supporters called for official posts to be reserved for native born citizens. Hofmann lectured in the rural areas of the French occupied territory, calling for support of the general elections in February and March 1793 which he helped organize. He was elected into the Rhenish-German National Convention as a representative of Mainz and became its president, beating Georg Forster in a contested election. On 18 March 1793 Hofmann declared the Rhenish-German Free State from the balcony of the Deutschhaus. Three days later, Hofmann signed the convention's unanimously resolved decree asking for accession of the Free State to France. On 1 April 1793, Hofmann switched roles to become the president of the provisional administration.

== French government official and later life ==
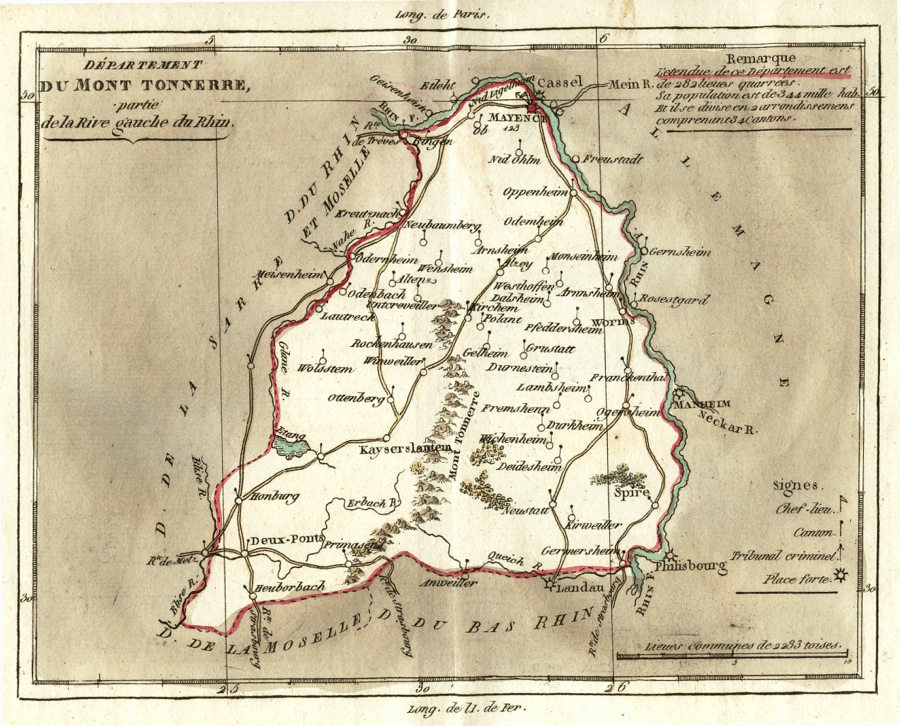
Map of the département Mont-Tonnerre, by Louis Brion 1802

When the republic ended after the siege of Mainz, Hofmann was able to leave the city with the retreating French troops and went into exile in Paris, where he headed a society of exiled Mainz republicans, the Societé des patriotes Mayençais and was working towards an exchange of prisoners to free the German revolutionaries captured by the authorities. After a short service in the military, where he commanded an equestrian regiment that fought against insurgent royalists in the Vendée and was wounded several times, he was sent to England on espionage missions. However, at a Joseph Haydn concert in London on 2 June 1794, he was recognized and reported to the authorities by his former student Klemens Wenzel von Metternich. Hofmann went into hiding and returned to Paris via Hamburg, where he visited Friedrich Gottlieb Klopstock. In Paris, he was made chief of the bureau des étrangers by the French Directory. In his 1795 essay Des nouvelles limites de la republique française, he argued for the Rhine as natural Eastern border of France. When the incorporation of areas west of the Rhine into France had become a reality with the Treaty of Campo Formio, Hofmann returned to Mainz, where he became part of the government of the new département Mont-Tonnerre and was appointed by Napoleon as its receveur général (superior tax officer) in 1797, the only non-native French holding this office. In 1801, he was elected as a member of the Mainz city council and refused an appointment as a member of the Corps législatif of the French Consulate. In 1803, he was forced to resign as receveur général after one of his subordinates had committed fraud, and 750,000 francs were missing from his coffers.

After Napoleon's defeat and the return of Mainz to German control, Hofmann moved to his late wife's estates in Winkel. While he was no longer active as a revolutionary, he was suspicious to the authorities as a Jacobin, and his house was searched in the 1830s. Hofmann spent his retirement pursuing activities such as breeding domestic canaries but became a somewhat famous figure among Vormärz liberals and was visited by intellectuals such as Hoffmann von Fallersleben and Ludwig Walesrode. He died on 6 September 1849, having witnessed the failure of the 1848 revolution, and was buried without a Catholic funeral.

== Family and legacy ==
Andreas Joseph Hofmann was the son of Anton Hofmann, a surgeon, and of Magdalena Fahrmann. In 1788, he married Catharina Josepha Rivora (1763–1799), the daughter of Peter Maria Rivora and Christina Schumann. They had three daughters, of which two died early. His daughter Charlotte Sturm died in 1850 and bequeathed most of her belongings to Charlotte Lehne, the granddaughter of Hofmann's student Friedrich Lehne. None of Hofmann's personal papers and correspondence have been preserved, and there is no known picture of him. Overall, there is far less known about Hofmann's life than about most of the other leading members of the Mainz Jacobin club.

In 2018, a road in Winkel was named Andreas-Joseph-Hofmann-Straße.

== Selected works ==
- Hofmann, Andreas Joseph (1779). Ueber das Studium der philosophischen Geschichte (in German). Vienna: Ghelensche Erben.
- Hofmann, Andreas Joseph (1792). Der Aristokraten-Katechismus: ein wunderschönes Büchlein, gar erbaulich zu lesen : für Junge und Alte (in German). Mainz.
- Hofmann, Andreas Joseph (1795). Des nouvelles limites de la republique française (in French). Paris.

== Notable students ==
- Johann Adam von Itzstein (1775–1855)
- Friedrich Lehne (1771–1836)
- Klemens von Metternich (1773–1859)
- Johannes Weitzel (1771–1837)
