= Germain Metternich =

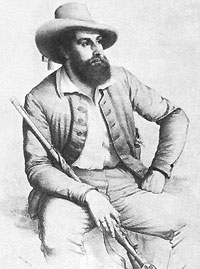
Germain Metternich in a contemporary portrait with "Heckerhut“ and shotgun.

Germain Franz Metternich (5 April 1811 (Note: Regarding birthday and -year sources with different readings exist. 10 April is noted as his birthday as well, and his year of birth sometimes also appears as 1804. An entry in a parish register, retrievable via familysearch.org using search criterion "Germain Metternich“, documents the baptism of a "Germannus Franciscus Metternich“ on 6 April 1811 in Mainz Cathedral, leading to the conclusion that 5 April 1811 as birthday and -year seems most plausible.) in Mainz – 13 May 1862 on Tybee Island, Georgia) was the son of Mathias Metternich, one of the leading Mainz Jacobins. Metternich pursued a military career initially, but became involved with the German democratic movement in the southern states of the German Confederation from the beginning of the 1830s onward. He participated in the Hambacher Fest and later in the campaigns of the Revolutions of 1848 in the German states. In 1850 he immigrated to the United States as part of a larger wave of politically active Forty-Eighters, following the defeat of that movement in continental Europe, and remained politically active in his new, democratic homeland. Because of this background, he was particularly concerned with the struggle for of human rights and became involved with both the socialist and the abolitionist movements. At the beginning of the American Civil War he joined the Union Army. He was killed in 1862 by a drunken fellow soldier.

== Early years ==
Germain Metternich was born in 1811 in Mayence, the capital of the French Département du Mont-Tonnerre at that time. His father was a university professor, Mathias Metternich, who had been one of the leading Mainz Jacobins during the period of 1792/1793 and vice-president of the Rheinisch-Deutscher Nationalkonvent (Rhenish-German National Convention) in 1793. In his early life, Metternich pursued a military career, rising by the early 1830s at the latest to the rank of a lieutenant of the dragoons for the Grand Duchy of Hesse, before ending his military career in order to take part in the emerging democratic movement in Central Europe. As the head of the Mainz delegation of about 400 citizens he took part in the Hambacher Fest in May 1832, along with the wine merchant Georg Strecker. On 11 June 1832 he helped to organize a Whitsunday celebration in the Niederwald forest, an event with similar political goals and symbolism to the Hambacher Fest. Metternich was imprisoned several times for his political activities during this period, finally being sentenced to a three-year prison term in the Marksburg castle. After having served out his sentence, Metternich went into exile in Switzerland. Later, he returned to Mainz, where he became a leader of the local political Turnerschaft ("Freie Turngemeinde“) in 1847. The increasingly radical Turnerschaft was very active in Mainz, both politically and militarily, similar to the organized carnival movement led by the Mainzer Carneval-Verein (Mainz carnival association), another group that was very politically active in the Vormärz period.

== Activities during the German Revolution 1848/1849 ==
The first uprisings of the German Revolution reached Mainz in spring 1848. A vigilance committee was formed very quickly under the command of Franz Heinrich Zitz, a local lawyer. Metternich was elected as his adjutant. At the same time, Metternich was also in charge of a paramilitary, partially armed unit of politically active gymnasts ("Turner"). In late April 1848, Metternich joined the Mainz chapter of the "Communist League“. This was an early organisation of the labour movement headquartered in Brussels, which was where Karl Marx was living at that time. When the "Demokratische Verein“ was founded on 11 May 1848, Metternich also joined this association. At the first of two conventions for democratic politicians, held in the Free City of Frankfurt in June 1848, he was elected, along with others such as Franz Heinrich Zitz, to serve on the provisional central committee of the Radical Democrat faction.

When in May 1848 insurrections versus the Prussian troops in Rheinhessen were mobilised, Metternich was on the side of the vigilance committee. In a combat in the palace garden of Kirchheimbolanden, the revolutionary were defeated and Metternich fled together with other leading revolutionaries like Ludwig Bamberger, Louis Blenker, and Franz Zitz abroad. After his participation in the September uprising of 17 and 18 September in Frankfurt was unveiled, authorities wished to apprehend him, so he had to get into hiding again. He appeared on a "Signalement“ (wanted poster), published in the newspaper Schleswig-Holsteinische Anzeigen on 2 October 1848. There Metternich was described as follows: Signalement: 1) Germain Metternich from Mainz: age about 25 years, height very huge, hair golden blond, eyes blue, eyebrows blond, nose bended, mouth well-proportioned, forehead high, beard golden blond and awesome, chin covered over, teeth sound, face oval, clouring healthful, constitution type athletic and slim. He returned to Germany during the Constitution Campaigns of 1849 and participated actively in the Palatinate-Baden uprising. There he fought amongst others together with Franz Sigel. After the abolition he fled to Switzerland again. In Mainz he was charged with a "High treason” lawsuit in the following year. Metternich was acquitted, but expelled from Germany. When Switzerland also expelled him shortly afterwards, he emigrated to the USA.

== Life in the United States ==
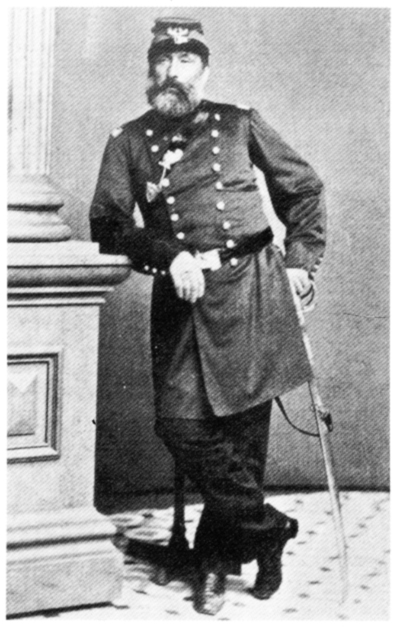
Lieutenant Colonel Germain Metternich, 1861-1862

When Metternich emigrated to the United States in 1850 he settled in New York. Metternich was engaged with the set up of a political active Turnerschaft. Under his decisive influence the "Socialistischer Turnverein von New-York“. socialistic Turnverein of New-York founded in 1848 turned political. In the United States Metternich belonged to the influential members of the Forty-Eighters.

When the American Civil War started in 1861 Metternich enlisted in the Union Army. He served in the 46th New York Volunteer Infantry, consisting mostly of German immigrants under Colonel Rudolph Rosa, as lieutenant colonel. In the early summer 1862 Metternich was participating in military operations versus Fort Pulaski located between Savannah and Tybee Island, Georgia. When he tried to settle a quarrel among drunken soldiers, a tumbling soldier with a bayonet rammed him down and hit his throat. Metternich died due to this injury.

== Literature ==
- Richard Falck: Germain Metternich: ein deutscher Freiheitskämpfer, der letzte Staatsgefangene der Marksburg; Eine Lebensbeschreibung. Auslieferung: H. Krichtel, Mainz 1954.
- Walter Hell: Der Radikaldemokrat Germain Metternich und die freisinnigen Rheingauer. in: Walter Hell: Vom Mainzer Rad zum Hessischen Löwen. Sutton Verlag Erfurt, 2008. ISBN 978-3-86680-356-5.
- Anton Maria Keim: Germain Metternich – vom Mainzer Revolutionär zum amerikanischen Turner-General. in: Lebendiges Rheinland-Pfalz. Zeitschrift für Kultur und Geschichte. Ausgabe 13, 1976, S. 86–88.
