= Andreas Joseph Fahrmann =

German theologian and cleric

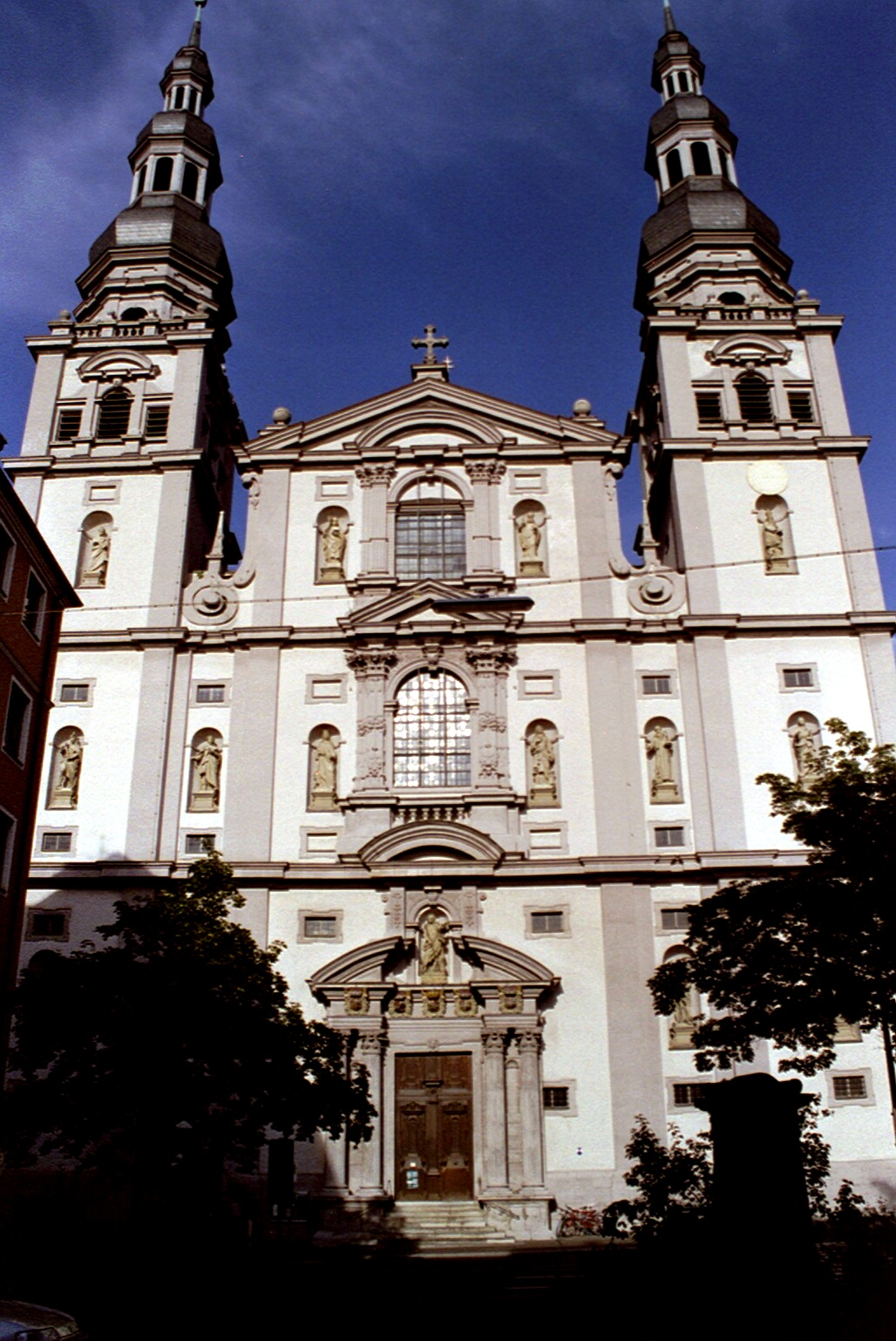
Stift Haug in Würzburg, where Fahrmann was a canon

Andreas Joseph Fahrmann (8 November 1742 - 6 February 1802) was a German theologian and cleric.

Fahrmann was born in Zell am Main near Würzburg, in the Prince-Bishopric of Würzburg. He was ordained as a deacon in 1764 and as a priest in 1765. After obtaining his doctorate in 1773, he was the professor of moral theology at the University of Würzburg until 1779, when he was made a canon at Stift Haug, a collegiate church in Würzburg. In 1790, he became auxiliary bishop and titular bishop of Halmiros, now Thebae Phthiotides, a position he held until his death in 1802. One of Fahrmann's known works is a theological review of Karl Friedrich Bahrdt's controversial bible translation.
