= Republic of Mainz =

German client state of France in 1793

Coordinates: 49°59′58″N 8°16′25″E

Republic of Mainz / Rhenish-German Free State: Mainzer Republik (German); Rheinisch-Deutscher Freistaat (German); République de Mayence (French)
- March – July 1793
- Status: Client state of France
- Capital: Mainz
- Common languages: German (Hessian dialects); Yiddish; French
- Government: Revolutionary republic
- Historical era: French Revolutionary Wars
  - Occupied by Custine: 21 October 1792
  - Independence proclaimed: 18 March 1793
  - Delegates sent to Paris: 23 March 1793
  - National Convention approved accession to French Republic: 30 March 1793
  - Reconquered by Austro-Prussian forces: 22 July 1793
Preceded by	Succeeded by
Electorate of Mainz	Electorate of Mainz
- Today part of: Germany

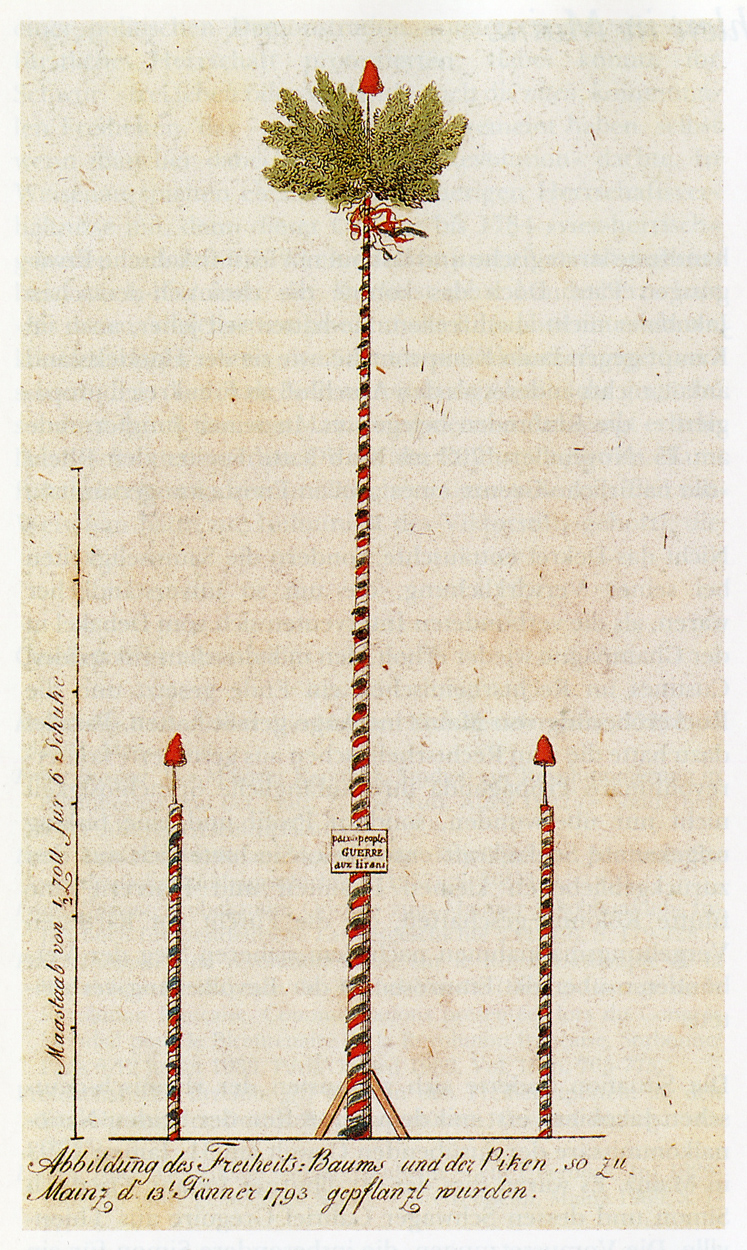
Liberty pole, erected in Mainz in January 1793

The Republic of Mainz was the first democratic state in the current German territory and was centered in Mainz. A product of the French Revolutionary Wars, it lasted from March to July 1793.

== Context ==
During the War of the First Coalition against France, the Prussian and Austrian troops that had invaded France retreated after the Battle of Valmy, allowing the French revolutionary army to counterattack. The troops of General Custine entered the Palatinate in late September and occupied Mainz on 21 October 1792. The ruler of Mainz, Elector-Archbishop Friedrich Karl Joseph von Erthal, had fled the city.

== Jacobin club ==
On the next day, 20 citizens of Mainz founded a Jacobin club, the Gesellschaft der Freunde der Freiheit und Gleichheit (English: Society of the Friends of Liberty and Equality). Together with their filial clubs founded later in Speyer and Worms, they promoted the Enlightenment and the French revolutionary ideals of liberté, égalité, fraternité in Germany, aiming for a German republic to be established following the French model. Most of the founding members of the Jacobin club were professors and students of the University of Mainz, together with the university librarian, Georg Forster, some merchants and Mainz state officials. For some time the ecclesiastic Friedrich Georg Pape was president of the club and editor of the Mainzer Nationalzeitung (English: Mainz National Newspaper).

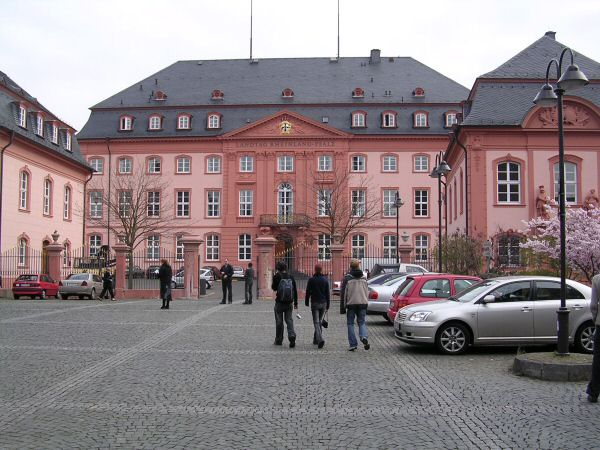
The Deutschhaus in Mainz

== Founding ==
By order of the French National Convention, elections in the French-occupied territories west of the Rhine were held on 24 February 1793. 130 cities and towns sent their deputies to Mainz. The first democratically elected parliament on the territory of future Germany, called the Rheinisch-Deutscher Nationalkonvent (English: Rhenish-German National Convention), met initially on 17 March 1793, in the Deutschhaus building in Mainz (today the seat of the Rhineland-Palatinate state parliament). The convention declared the represented territory (which extended to Bingen in the west and to Landau in the south) to be free and democratic, and disclaimed any ties to the empire. The convention's president, Andreas Joseph Hofmann, proclaimed the Rhenish-German Free State (German: Rheinisch-Deutscher Freistaat) from the balcony of the Deutschhaus. On 21 March 1793, it was decided to seek the accession of the Free State to France and delegates (among them Georg Forster and Adam Lux) were sent to Paris. The French National Convention granted the request on 30 March.

== End ==
Soon after, Prussian troops retook all the French-occupied territory except for the heavily fortified city of Mainz itself. After a long siege in which much of the city was destroyed, Prussian and Austrian troops conquered the city on 22 July 1793. The republic ended, and the Jacobins were persecuted until 1795 when Mainz came under French control again.
