= Siege of Mainz (1793) =

1793 siege during the War of the First Coalition

- Part of the French Revolutionary War
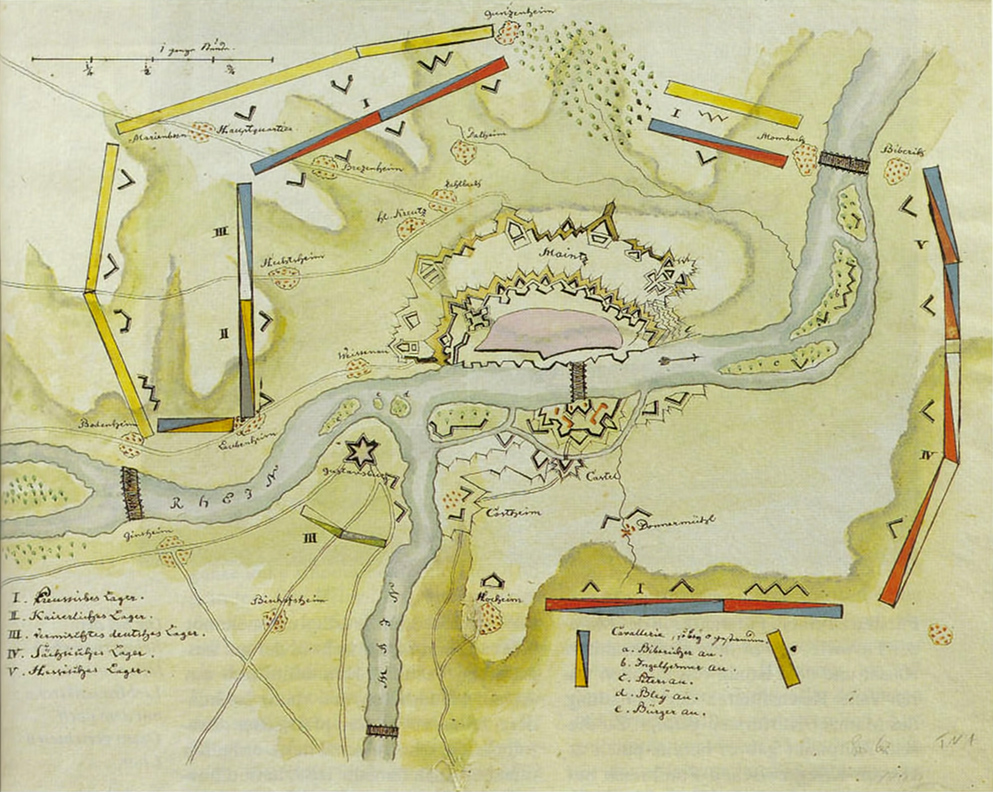
Date	14 April – 23 July 1793
Location	Mainz, Republic of Mainz (present-day Germany) 50.0000°N 8.2711°E
Result	Coalition victory

Belligerents
France	Holy Roman Empire; Kingdom of Prussia; Austria; Saxony; Hesse-Kassel; Hesse-Darmstadt; Palatinate; (Electorate of Saxony) Saxe-Weimar

Commanders and leaders
(French First Republic) Ignace d'Oyré (French First Republic) Alexandre de Beauharnais	(Holy Roman Empire) (Kingdom of Prussia) Duke of Brunswick (Holy Roman Empire) (Kingdom of Prussia) Field Marshal von Kalckreuth

Strength
22,000–23,000 men, 184 cannons	36,000–43,000 men, 207 cannons

Casualties and losses
4,000 killed or wounded 18,000–19,000 captured (released after the battle)	3,000 killed or wounded
- Location within Europe

In the siege of Mainz (German: Belagerung von Mainz), from 14 April to 23 July 1793, a coalition of Prussia, Austria, and other German states led by the Holy Roman Empire besieged and captured Mainz from revolutionary French forces. The allies, especially the Prussians, first tried negotiations, but this failed, and the bombardment of the city began on the night of 17 June.

== Siege ==
Within the town the siege and bombardment led to stress between citizens, municipality and the French war council, governing since 2 April. The city administration was displaced on 13 July; this increased the stubbornness of the remaining population. Since a relief army was missing, the war council was forced to take up negotiations with the allied forces on 17 July; the remaining soldiers capitulated on 23 July.

Nearly 19,000 French troops surrendered at the end of the siege, but were allowed to return to France if they promised not to fight against the allies for one year. Consequently, they were used to fight French royalists in the Vendée region of France. They left the town singing La Marseillaise (also known as the Chant de guerre de l'Armée du Rhin).

The Republic of Mainz, the first democratic state on the later on German territory, was subsequently dissolved. Mainz received a Prussian commander to administer the city. The bombardment had left devastating traces in the townscape: some civil buildings and aristocratic palaces like the comedy house, the electoral pleasure palace Favorite, the House of the Cathedral Provost, Liebfrauen- and the church of Society of Jesus had been destroyed, as well as St. Crucis, the Benedictine abbey St. Jacob on the citadel and the remains of St. Alban's Abbey. The cathedral had been heavily damaged.

The biggest impact of the occupation and siege was that the city's part in the old imperial electoral structure finally came to an end. Thus the events of the year 1793 also marked the end of Aurea Moguntia, the Latin nickname for the city: "Golden Mainz". The city lost its status as the electoral residence.

The shelling of Mainz was widely discussed in Europe. Many people gathered round the town in order to view the siege. Johann Wolfgang von Goethe assisted Duke Carl August of Saxe-Weimar during the siege and wrote a famous book about the siege.

== Related people ==
- Friedrich Wilhelm Freiherr von Bülow
- Carl von Clausewitz
- Prince Louis Ferdinand of Prussia
- Georg Forster
- Heinrich von Kleist
- Heinrich Menu von Minutoli
- Karl Ludwig von Lecoq
- Andreas Joseph Hofmann
- Antoine Christophe Merlin
- Jean Baptiste Kléber
- François Christophe Kellermann
- Jean Baptiste Meusnier
- Louis Baraguey d'Hilliers
- Claude Pierre Pajol
- Jean Ambroise Baston de Lariboisière
- Adam Gottlob Detlef Moltke
- Joachim Moltke

== Bibliography ==
- Smith, D. The Greenhill Napoleonic Wars Data Book. Greenhill Books, 1998.
- Goethe, Johann Wolfgang von (1884). Miscellaneous travels of J. W. Goethe; comprising Letters from Switzerland; The campaign in France, 1792; The siege of Mainz; and A tour on the Rhine, Maine, and Neckar, 1814-15.
- Schmittlein, Raymond: Un Recit de Guerre de Goethe le Siege de Mayence II. Éditions Art et Science. Mayence. 1951. (in French)
- Arthur Chuquet: The Wars of the Revolution: The Siege of Mainz and the French Occupation of the Rhineland 1792–93.
- Bodart, Gaston (1908). Militär-historisches Kriegs-Lexikon (1618-1905) (in German).
- festung-mainz (2015). "Die Belagerung der Festung Mainz 1793" (in German). Archived from the original on 2015-03-24.

Preceded by Battle of Kaiserslautern	French Revolution: Revolutionary campaigns Siege of Mainz (1793)	Succeeded by Battle of Wattignies
