= Vitus Miletus =

German theologian (1549–1615)

Vitus Miletus (surname originally Möller) (born in 1549 at Gmünd, Swabia, died 11 September 1615 at Mainz) was a German Roman Catholic theologian.

== Life ==
He studied at the German College, Rome, from 1567 to 1575. On 28 October 1573, when he was dean of the students, Miletus gave a short address before Pope Gregory XIII, when the Pope was visiting the newly organized academy. Miletus was ordained in St. John Lateran on Easter Saturday, 1575, and returned to Germany in the summer of that year; on his way home he was made doctor of theology at Bologna (11 June 1575).

He was summoned to Mainz by the Elector Daniel Brendel von Homburg, where he was active in the reform of the clergy. From there he was sent by the elector to Erfurt, to assist the suffragan bishop Nicolaus Elgard in his efforts for the restoration of Catholicism. His sermons on the doctrine of the Eucharist, preached at Erfurt in Lent, 1579, involved him in sharp controversy with the Protestant preachers.

He was sent to Rome in 1582 to bring the pallium for the new archbishop, Wolfgang von Dalberg. The latter brought him back again to Mainz, and employed him on his affairs, notably on the visitation of monasteries. Also in 1601 and 1604 he brought from Rome the confirmation and the pallium for the succeeding archbishops, Adam von Bicken, and Schweikard von Cronberg.

He wrote and preached, defending the Catholic faith, until his death. He was provost of St. Moritz, dean of the Liebfrauenstift, canon of St. Victor's and St. Peter's, all in Mainz; and canon of St. Severus' at Erfurt. After 1575 he also had a canonry in the cathedral chapter at Breslau. He did not visit Breslau until 1599, and then only for a short time, while taking part in the election of a bishop; he then went to Rome to bring the confirmation of the elected bishop.

== Works ==
His polemical and apologetic writings are:

- "De festo Corporis Christi in honorem Jesu Christi" (Mainz, 1580);
- "Augenschein des Jesuiter Spiegels, so neuwlich zu Erffurdt in truck aussgangen" (Cologne, 1582);
- "De sacramentis, mille sexcenti errores, vaniloquia et cavillationes eorum, qui hoc tempore ab Ecclesia secesserunt catholica, cum brevi eorum refutatione; plerique collecti ex Kemnitio" (Mainz, 1593);
- "Brevis discussio et refutatio sexcentorum errorum, quos duo Praedicantes Saxonici Tilemannus Heshusius et Joannes Olearius Pontificiis hoc est Christianis Catholicis vanissime hactenus attribuerunt" (Mainz, 1604).
