= Marx Rumpolt =

German chef

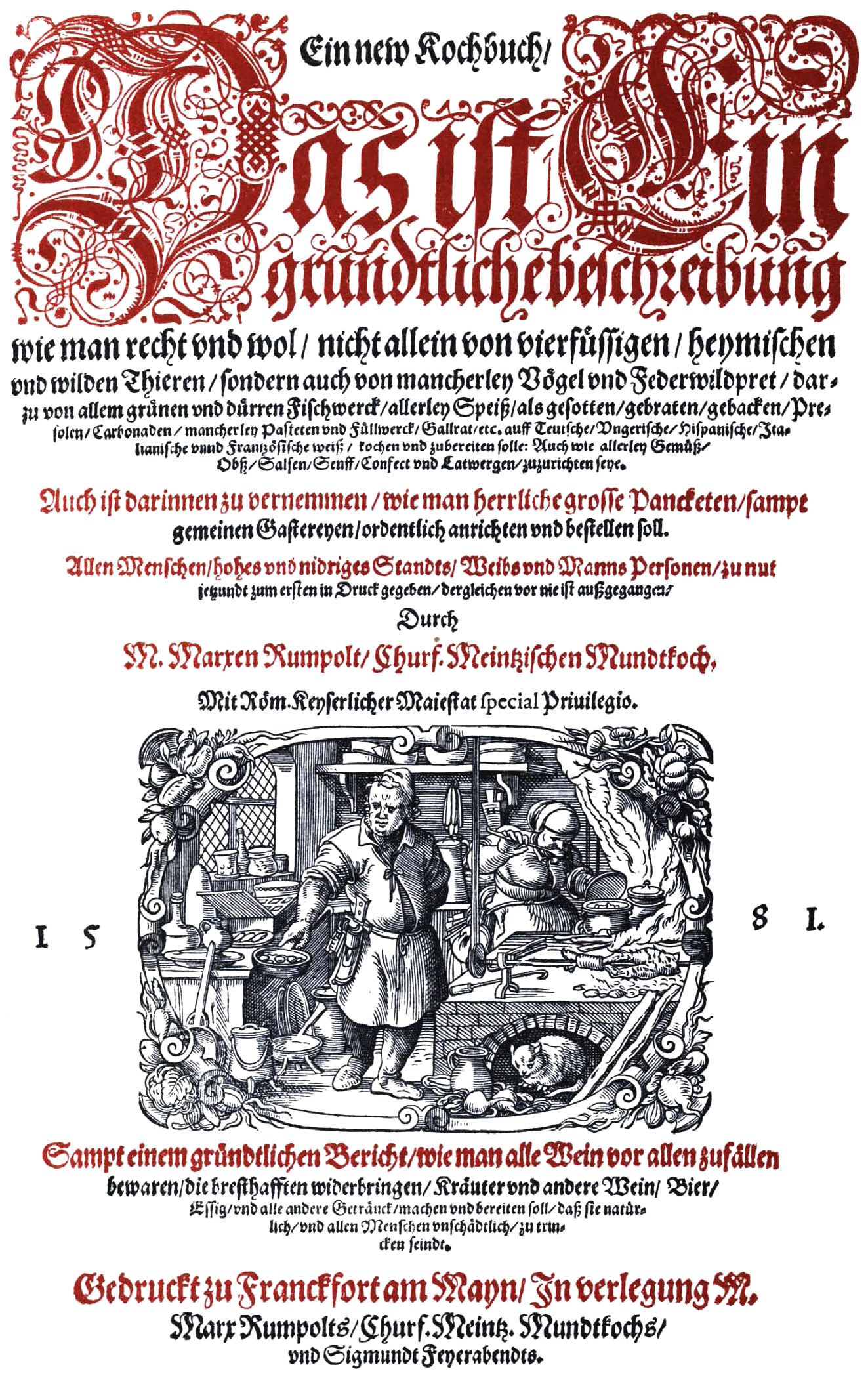
Title page of Ein new Kochbuch

Marx Rumpolt (* est. 1525; †1593 in Aschaffenburg) was head cook to the Elector of Mainz, Daniel Brendel of Homburg. His cookbook, Ein new Kochbuch (lit. "A New Cookbook"), written in 1581, was the first textbook for professional chefs in training.

Before Rumpolt came to the court of the Elector of Mainz, he worked for several other European nobles and thus came to learn of the cuisines of different regions, such as Bohemia and Hungary. A year before the death of his master, the Elector of Mainz, Rumpolt wrote his cookbook, which consisted of 2,000 recipes and instructions for wine making and 150 woodcuts by Jost Amman.

Rumpolt's cookbook was, like all cookbooks for that period, intended for aristocratic kitchens only.
