= Gentil =

Gentil may refer to:

People:

- Jean-Paul Alaux, called Gentil, French landscape painter and lithographer
- Émile Gentil, a French colonial administrator
- Guillaume Le Gentil, a French astronomer
- Jean-François Gentil, a French colonial officer
- Joseph Philippe Gentil, Mauritian composer
- Otto Gentil, German sculptor

Places:

- Gentil, Rio Grande do Sul, a municipality in Brazil
- Port-Gentil, a city in Gabon

Other:

- Gentil, a white wine blend from Alsace
