= Johann Adam von Bicken =

- Archbishop of Mainz
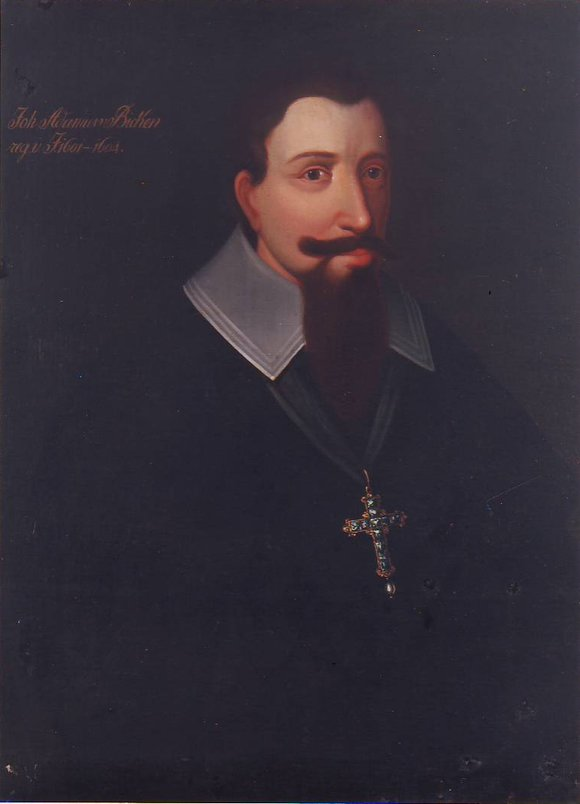
- Church: Catholic Church
- Diocese: Electorate of Mainz
- In office: 27 August 1601–11 January 1604

Personal details
- Born: 27 May 1564
- Died: 11 January 1604 (aged 39)

Johann Adam von Bicken (27 May 1564 – 11 January 1604) was the Archbishop-Elector of Mainz from 1601 to 1604.

== Biography ==
Johann Adam von Bicken was born in Hainchen Castle on 27 May 1564, the son of Philipp von Bicken and his wife Anna Brendelin von Homburg (sister of Daniel Brendel of Homburg). As a boy, he studied the seven liberal arts in Würzburg and Mainz. He then spent 1582 to 1584 studying in Pont-à-Mousson, before moving on to Bourges, Toulon, and Italy. He was fluent in French and Italian as well as his native German.

Johann von Bicken was destined for a career in the church from an early age. Before he was ten years old, his uncle, Daniel Brendel of Homburg arranged for him to become a canon of the cathedral chapter of Mainz Cathedral. During the reign of Wolfgang von Dalberg, Archbishop of Mainz, Johann held several administrative posts, and was present at the Regensburg Reichstag of 1597. He was elected Domscholaster in 1595.

The cathedral chapter of Mainz Cathedral elected Johann Adam von Bicken as the new Archbishop of Mainz on 15 May 1601. Pope Clement VIII confirmed his election on 27 August 1601.

Johann Adam's time as Archbishop of Mainz is notable for advancing the confessionalization of the Archbishopric of Mainz. He dismissed a number of Lutheran officials and required a profession of Roman Catholic faith from officials at the 1602 Feast of the Assumption (15 August 1602). The erection of the old arsenal was started under his reign.

A large number of witch trials were held during his time as archbishop.

Johann Adam von Bicken died in Aschaffenburg on 11 January 1604. He is buried in Mainz Cathedral.

== In popular culture ==
- Johann von Bicken is a character in Tobias Sammet's Avantasia metal opera albums The Metal Opera and The Metal Opera Part II, where he is voiced by Rob Rock.

Catholic Church titles
Preceded by Wolfgang von Dalberg	Archbishop of Mainz; 1601 – 1604	Succeeded by Johann Schweikhard von Kronberg
