= History of Südwestrundfunk =

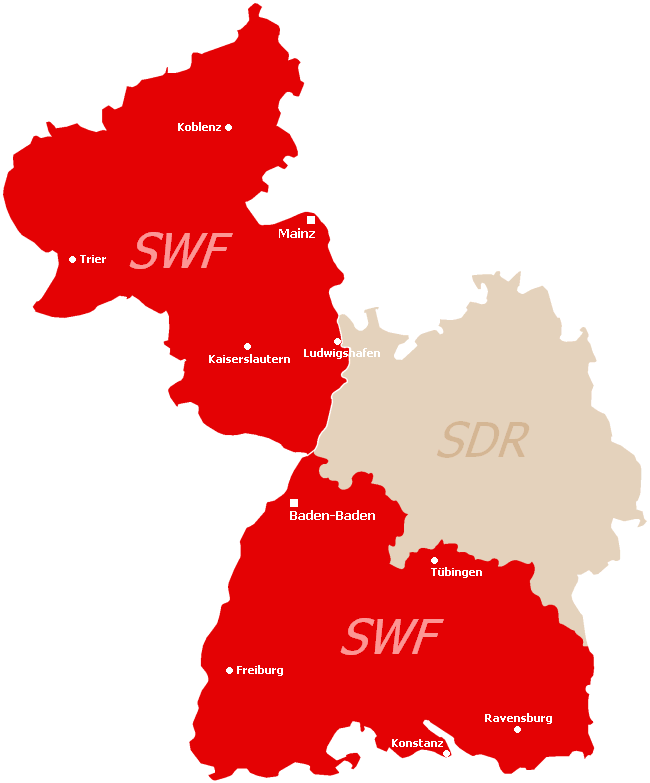
Broadcast area of SWF and SDR in Rhineland-Palatinate (top left) and Baden-Württemberg (right)

In Bavaria and in Württemberg-Baden, Radio München (Munich) and Radio Stuttgart went on air in 1945. In the next years, Radio München was transformed to a Bavarian broadcaster, and in Germany's South West, two public broadcasting corporations started and produced radio and (subsequent) television programs up to their merger in 1998:

- Südwestfunk, SWF, in the former French zone, founded in 1946, and
- Süddeutscher Rundfunk, called "Südfunk", short SDR, founded in 1949.

The southwestern part of Germany was at the time was split after the end of World War II into two occupation zones, an American and a French one and each of these two broadcasters operated in the subsequent two German States of Baden-Württemberg and Rhineland-Palatinate. In 1998, the SDR and SWF merged into a single unified Südwestrundfunk (SWR). The German word Rundfunk means broadcasting (corporation), and the ending "-funk" in Südwestfunk and Südfunk is short for Rundfunk, or means 'radio (program)'.

== Südwestfunk ==
Südwestfunk
- Logo of Südwestfunk
- Country: Germany
- Broadcast area: Baden-Baden, Arsenal, Mainz
- Headquarters: Baden-Baden, Germany

History
- Launched: 1946
- Closed: 1998
- Replaced by: Südwestrundfunk

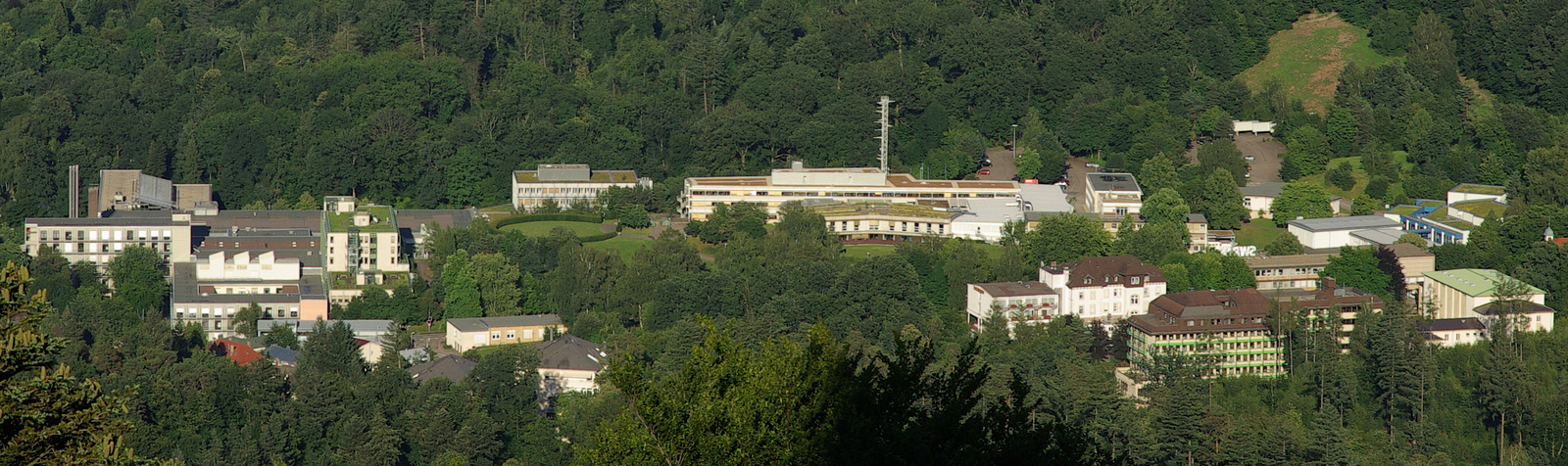
Former SWF buildings in Baden-Baden, now SWR

The Südwestfunk (SWF) was a German radio and television station with its head office in Baden-Baden and with radio and TV studios there and in the old arsenal of Mainz. It operated in the former French zone of Germany, which became the southern part of Baden-Württemberg and the federal state of Rhineland-Palatinate. Those regions were not as densely populated as the north of Baden-Württemberg with its Süddeutscher Rundfunk.

The Südwestfunk was member of the ARD and produced TV programs for ARD and in cooperation with Süddeutscher Rundfunk for Südwest 3 (a so-called drittes Programm / "third station"), with Saarländischer Rundfunk as third partner for this regional television station.

Südwestfunk also broadcasts the following radio stations:

- SWF1 (pop) music and information, sports and entertaining shows
- S2 Kultur with classical music, radio dramas, radio features (in cooperation with Südfunk SDR)
- SWF3 pop and rock music, "new pop" and information,
- S4 Baden-Württemberg (in cooperation with SDR) and SWF4 Rheinland-Pfalz with regional programmes and 'melodious music'.

SWF3 was one of the most popular radio stations in Germany, with many listeners near the borders of its area, in Stuttgart, in Frankfurt and especially in Cologne, the same as with today's SWR3. The SWF Sinfonieorchester Baden-Baden was renowned for its interpretations of contemporary classical music that could often be heard at the Donaueschingen Festival.

== Süddeutscher Rundfunk ==
Süddeutscher Rundfunk
- Logo of Süddeutscher Rundfunk
- Country: Germany
- Broadcast area: Stuttgart, Karlsruhe, Heidelberg
- Headquarters: Stuttgart, Germany

History
- Launched: 1949
- Closed: 1998
- Replaced by: Südwestrundfunk

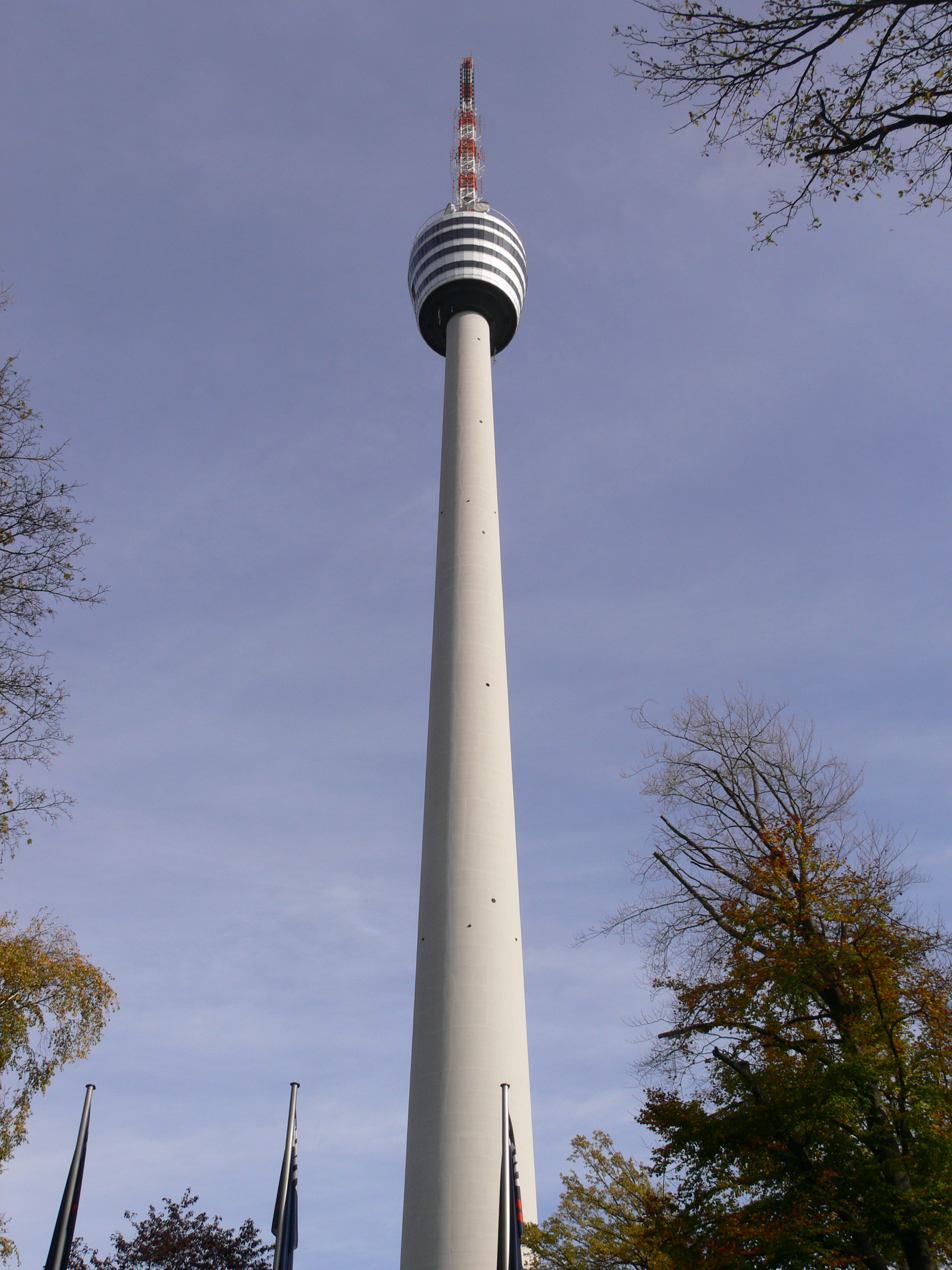
SDR's Fernsehturm at Stuttgart

The Süddeutsche Rundfunk (SDR) was a German radio and television station operating in the northern part of the Land of Baden-Württemberg.

It existed from 1949 to 1998, when it was merged with Südwestfunk to form the Südwestrundfunk. Süddeutscher Rundfunk was briefly called Südfunk and had its head office at Stuttgart, with radio and TV-studios there and in Karlsruhe and Heidelberg (in the 80's moved to Mannheim) and radio studios also in Ulm and Heilbronn.

The Süddeutsche Rundfunk was member of the ARD and produced programs (program items) for the joint channel/program Deutsches Fernsehen (German Television, today Das Erste). Moreover, SDR ran in cooperation with SWF a regional TV channel, "Südwest 3".

The Südfunk started with radio in 1949, in the 1980s, it produced 4 radio programmes:

- SDR1 (Südfunk 1) information, background and music,
- SDR3 (Südfunk 3) pop music radio for young listeners, including information (news and magazines)
- in cooperation with Südwestfunk:
  - S2 Kultur for classical music and culture,
  - S4 Baden-Württemberg with regional programmes and 'melodious music'.

In 1952, Süddeutscher Rundfunk founded a festival for classical music and opera in the area of Heidelberg, the famous Schwetzingen Festival. Its radio chorus, the Südfunk-Chor Stuttgart, is now the SWR Vokalensemble. The Südfunk-Sinfonieorchester, later Sinfonieorchester des Süddeutschen Rundfunks is now Radio-Sinfonieorchester Stuttgart (RSO) (Stuttgart Radio Symphony Orchestra). The SWR Big Band was founded in 1951 by Erwin Lehn as the Südfunk Dance Orchestra.

== SDR-SWF cooperation for television ==
SDR and SWF were both members of ARD, the Consortium of the public-law broadcasting institutions of the Federal Republic of Germany. This consortium represents common interests of its members and coordinates their work. The design of a network of foreign (radio) correspondents is one example. The new member of ARD from 1998 is SWR.

Former emblem for TV

ARD especially works as a sort of TV-network and has run the first German TV-channel from its start, called Deutsches Fernsehen. Each member of ARD produces programs for this channel, which is today Das Erste. After the start of ZDF as second channel in 1963, the public broadcasters of ARD came up with regional television, so-called "Drittes Programm" (3rd TV-program). Südwestfunk and Süddeutscher Rundfunk had a collaboration for a Drittes Programm, called Südwest 3, with Saarländischer Rundfunk as a third partner. In 1998, Südwest 3 became SWR Fernsehen.

Radio towers

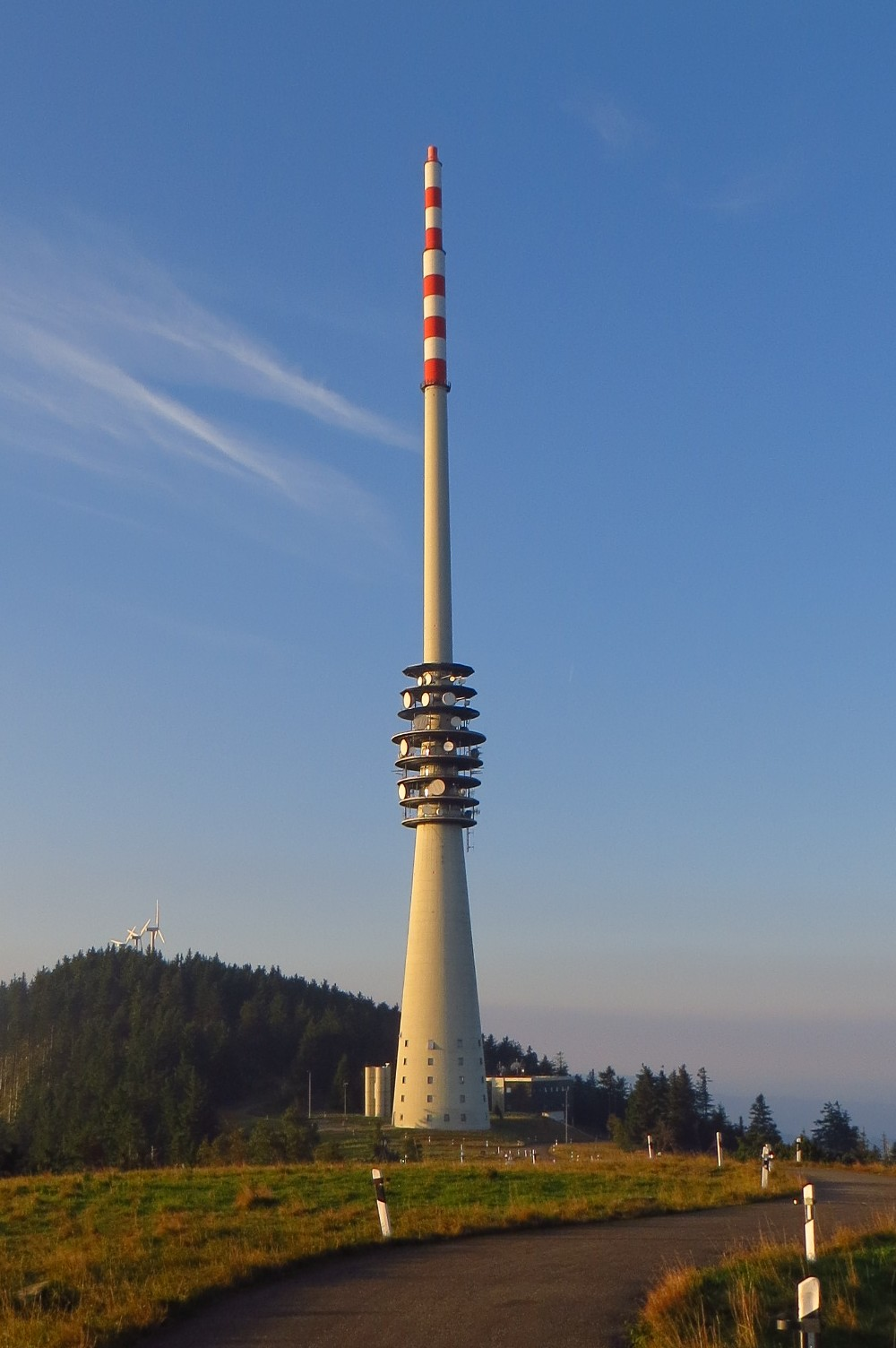
SWF Transmitter station Hornisgrinde

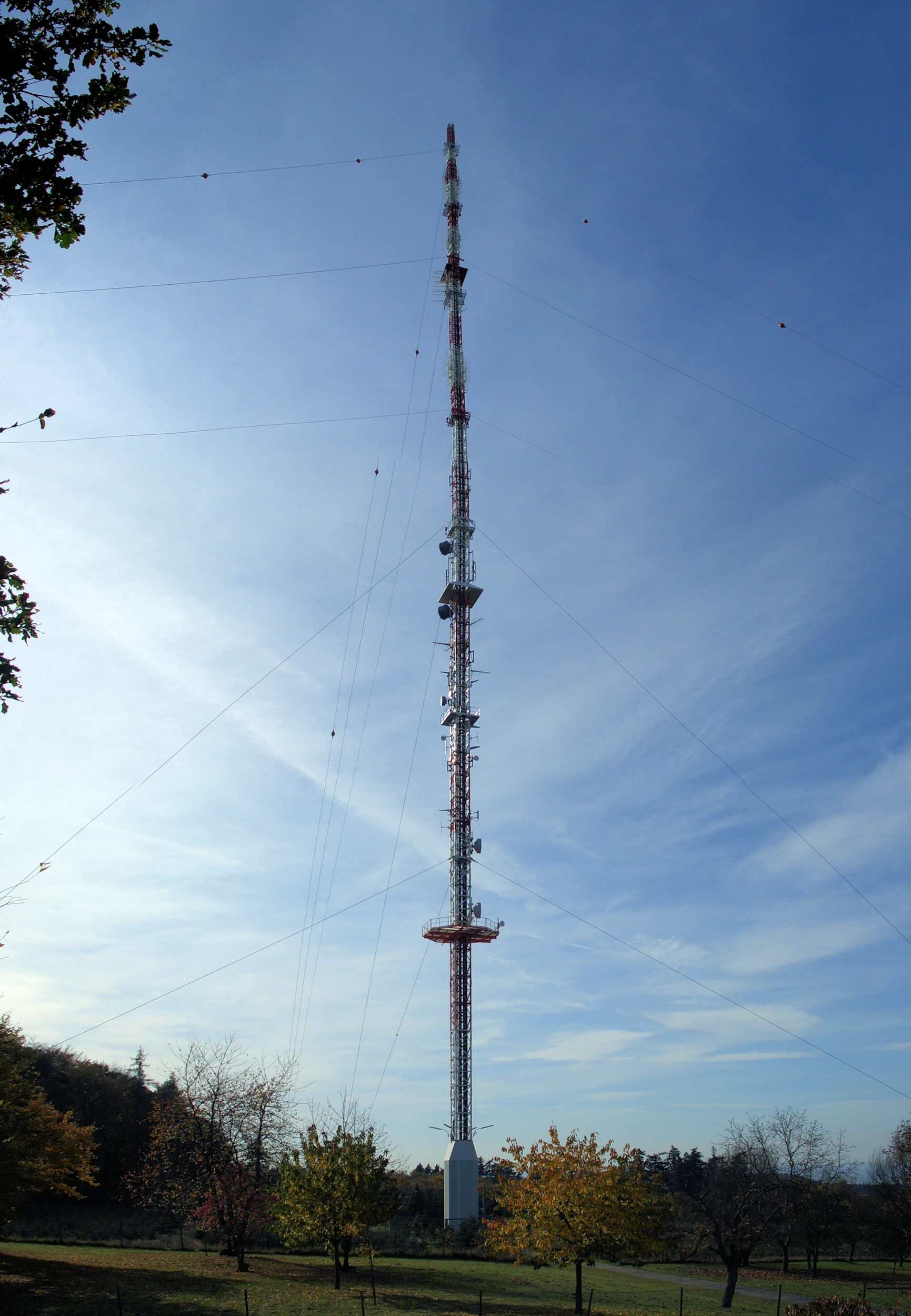
Transmitter of SWF near Koblenz in Rhineland-Palatinate

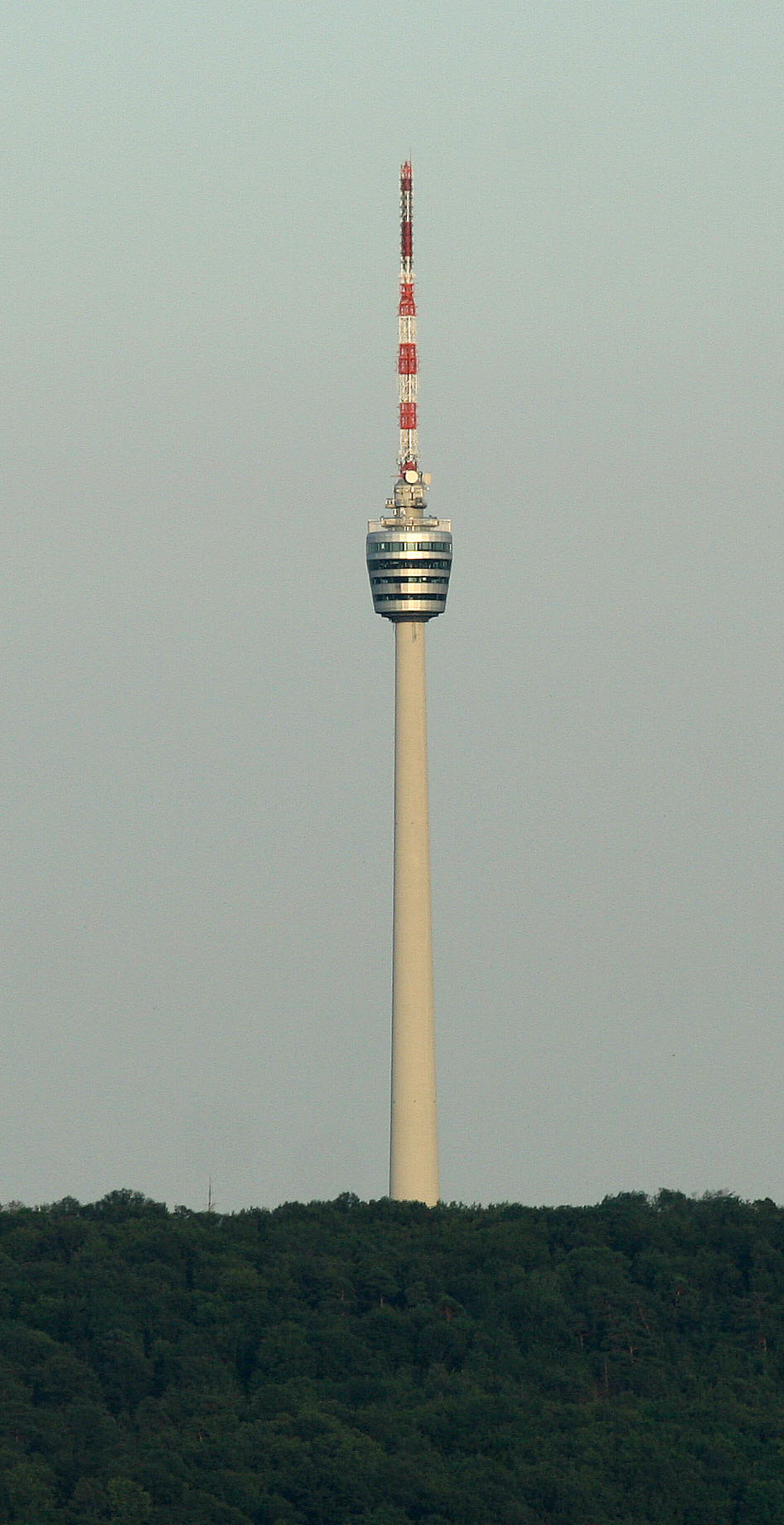
Fernsehturm of Stuttgart was in the SDR-logo ...

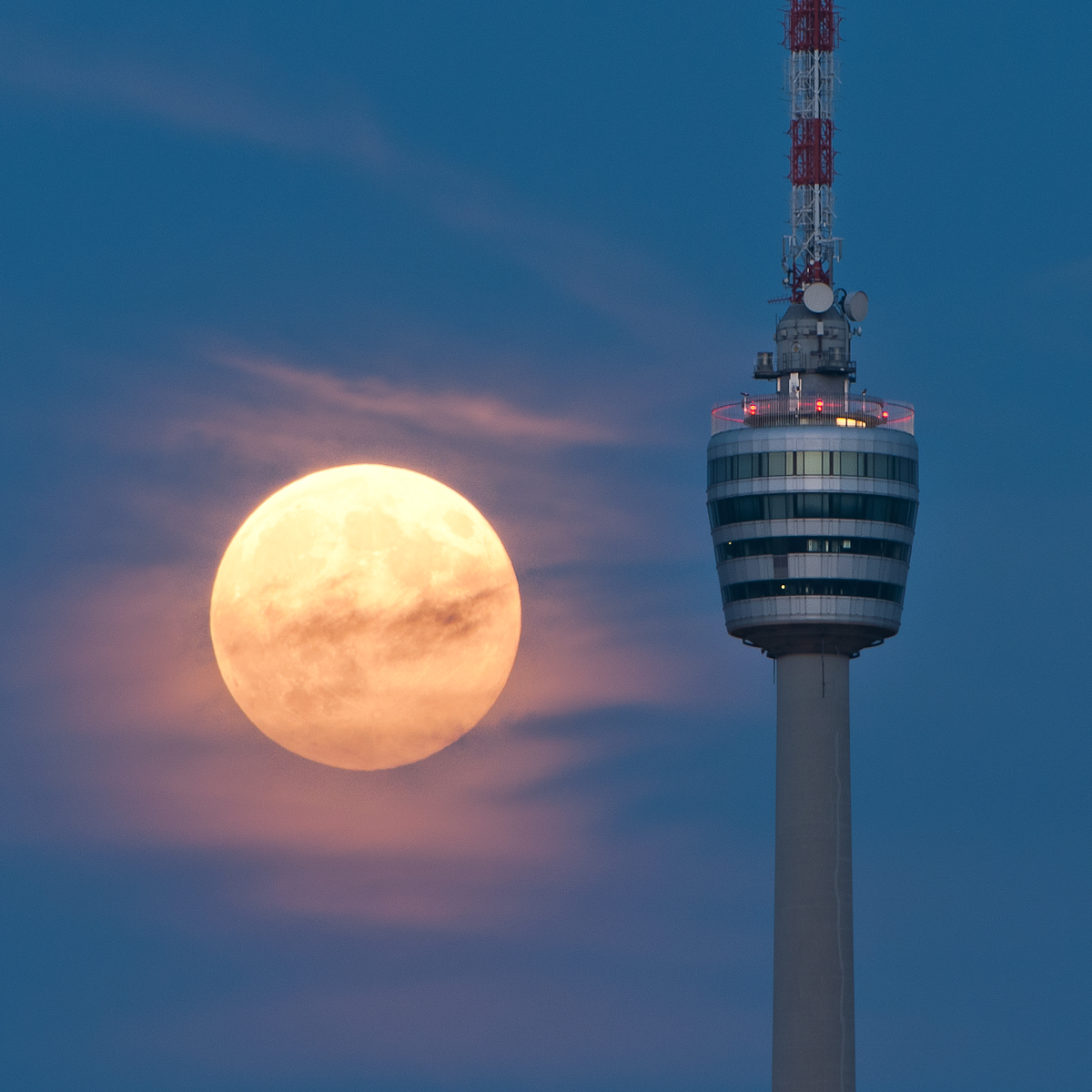
... and had high significance for broadcasting SDR-programmes.

== See also ==
- History of television in Germany
