= Pierre Hauck =

German legal scholar

Pierre Hauck (born 1976 in Aschaffenburg) is a German legal scholar. The following portrayal traces the key stages of his academic career and documents his most important publications.

== Career ==
Hauck first studied law at Justus Liebig University in Giessen from 1997 to 2001, where he passed his first state law examination. During this time, he worked as a student assistant for Walter Gropp. Gropp was also his doctoral supervisor during the preparation of his dissertation from 2001 to 2003; Hauck also passed his second state law examination during this period.

Hauck transferred to the University of Sussex, where he completed postgraduate studies in international criminal law and comparative criminal law from 2005 to 2006. In the year of his return, he obtained his doctorate in law from the University of Giessen and then worked as a research assistant until 2008. In 2007, he graduated from the University of Sussex with an LL.M. in International Criminal Law.

He wrote his habilitation thesis on the topic of ‘Heimliche Strafverfolgung und Schutz der Privatheit (Covert Criminal Investigation and the Protection of Privacy)’ between 2007 and 2011. During this period, Hauck also held various positions at other faculties.

In 2010, Hauck received a DFG research fellowship as a visiting scholar at the University of Oxford (UK) with Professor Andrew Ashworth. In 2011, he received the Dr Herbert Stolzenberg Prize from the University of Giessen for his postdoctoral thesis.

After serving as acting chair of criminal law and criminal procedure at the University of Giessen and criminal law, criminal procedure and legal philosophy at the University of Trier in the winter semester of 2011 and summer semester of 2012, he was appointed to the chair of criminal law, Criminal Procedure Law and Philosophy of Law at the University of Trier. In 2014, that university's executive committee awarded him the prize for outstanding achievements in academic teaching. On 1 October 2018, Hauck took over the chair of Criminal Law and Criminal Procedure Law at Justus Liebig University Giessen.

In 2018 and 2020, his research received funding from the European Commission. This led to the publication of *Fraud in Europe*, *The EPPO/OLAF Compendium of National Procedures*, and commentaries on *The PIF Directive*, *The OLAF Regulation* and *The EPPO Regulation*.

From 1 October 2022 to 30 September 2025, he served for three years as Dean of Studies for the Faculty of Law at JLU Giessen.

Hauck is a member of the DFG network ‘The Role of Comparative Criminal Law in the Europeanisation of Criminal Justice’.

== Main works ==
- The OLAF Regulation. A Commentary on the Regulation Concerning Investigations Conducted by the European Anti-Fraud Office (OLAF), Cheltenham: Edward Elgar Publishing, 2026, ISBN 978-1-0353-6094-9
- The EPPO Regulation. A Commentary on the Rules on Investigations and Investigation Measures in Relation to the Fight Against Fraud (Articles 26-33), Cheltenham: Edward Elgar Publishing, 2026, ISBN 978-1-03536-092-5
- The PIF Directive. A Commentary on the Directive on the Fight against Fraud Affecting the EU's Financial Interests by Means of Criminal Law, Cheltenham: Edward Elgar Publishing, 2025, ISBN 978-1-0353-6096-3
- Fraud in Europe. From Roman Law to the Implementation of the PIF Directive, Cheltenham: Edward Elgar Publishing, 2025, ISBN 978-1-0353-7517-2
- The EPPO/OLAF Compendium of National Procedures. Desktop Codes on the Procedural Law of the Member States with Annotations by National Experts, Berlin: Logos, 2024, ISBN 978-3-8325-5743-0. (with Jan-Martin Schneider)
- Europarechtliche Vorgaben für das nationale Strafverfahren, in: Martin Böse (ed.), Enzyklopädie Europarecht, Vol. 11 Europäisches Strafrecht, 2nd ed., Baden-Baden: Nomos, 2021, pp. 543–632.
- Commentary on §§ 100a-101b as well as §§ 110a-111a StPO, in: Jörg-Peter Becker et al. (eds.), Löwe-Rosenberg, Die Strafprozessordnung und das Gerichtsverfassungsgesetz, Großkommentar, Vol. 3, pp. 169–599, Vol. 4, 28th ed. 2025; Vol. III/1, pp. 301–750 and 914–1054, 27th ed. 2019; Vol. 3, pp. 296–608 and 769–901, 26th ed. 2014, Verlag de Gruyter: Berlin.
- International Law and Transnational Organised Crime, Oxford: University Press, 2016, ISBN 978-0-19-873373-7 (as contributing editor together with Sven Peterke).
- Heimliche Strafverfolgung und Schutz der Privatheit: eine vergleichende und interdisziplinäre Analyse des deutschen und englischen Rechts unter Berücksichtigung der Strafverfolgung in der Europäischen Union und im Völkerstrafrecht, also Gießen, Univ., postdoctoral thesis (Habil.-Schrift), 2011, Tübingen: Mohr Siebeck, 2014, ISBN 978-3-16-151919-2
- Judicial decisions in the pre-trial phase of criminal proceedings in France, Germany, and England: a comparative analysis responding to the law of the International Criminal Court, also Sussex, Univ., master thesis 2006, Baden-Baden: Nomos, 2008, ISBN 978-3-8329-3834-5
- Drittzueignung und Beteiligung, also Gießen, Univ., doctoral thesis, 2006, Baden-Baden: Nomos: 2007, ISBN 978-3-8329-2738-7
