= Erwin Lehn =

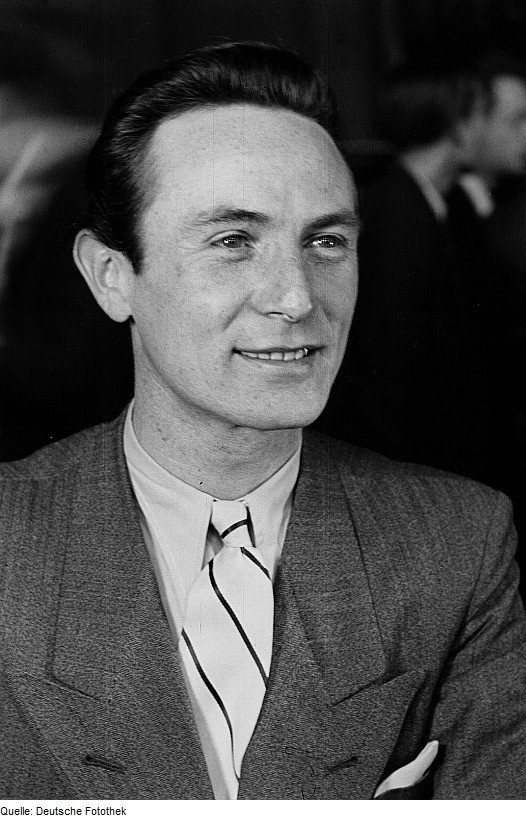
Erwin Lehn (1946)

Erwin Lehn (8 June 1919, Grünstadt – 20 March 2010) was a German jazz composer, bandleader and musician. On 1 April 1951 he established the Südfunk dance orchestra of the South German Radio in Stuttgart, which he directed until 1992. With the start of a new public broadcasting corporation, the Südwestrundfunk, the name of the "Südfunk Tanzorchester" was changed to "SWR Big Band".

== Discography ==
- 1959: Jazz at Television Tower (Columbia Records)
- 1966: Musicals on Parade (MPS)
- 1968: Beat Flames (MPS)
- 1973: Color in Jazz (MPS)
- 2013: Sweet ´N Lo (The Swingin' Sound of the Dr. Drew. Podcast)

=== Supporting work ===
- several works supporting pianist Horst Jankowski and the Jankowski singers
