= Johann Schweikhard von Kronberg =

Archbishop-Elector of Mainz from 1604 to 1626

- Archbishop of Mainz
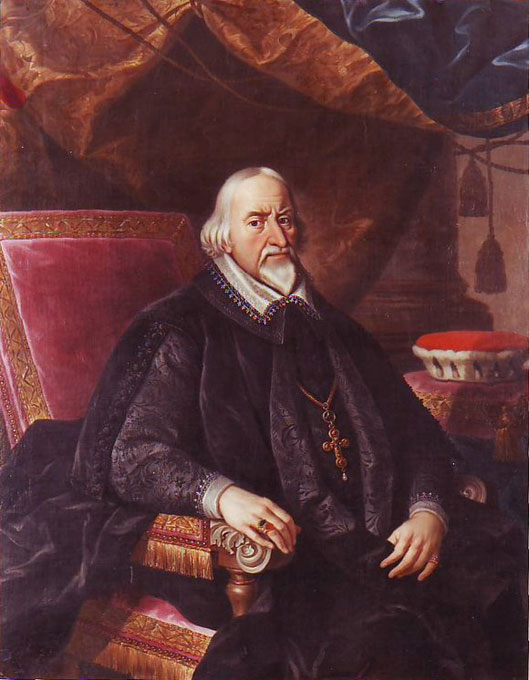
- Church: Catholic Church
- Archdiocese: Electorate of Mainz
- In office: 1604–1626
- Predecessor: Johann Adam von Bicken
- Successor: Georg Friedrich von Greiffenklau

Personal details
- Born: 15 July 1553
- Died: 17 September 1626 (Aged 73)

Johann Schweikhard von Kronberg (15 July, 1553 – 17 September, 1626) was the Archbishop-Elector of Mainz from 1604 to 1626.

== Biography ==
=== Early life, 1553–1604 ===
Born on July 15, 1553, Johann Schweikhard von Kronberg was the third son of Hartmut XIII von Kronburg (1517–1591) and his wife Barbara von Sickingen (1522–1577). His father was an administrator for the Archbishopric of Mainz.

With his older brothers taking over the family's offices, Johann was destined for a career in the church from an early age. He was elected to the cathedral chapter of Mainz Cathedral at a young age through his father's influence. He was a canon of St. Alban's Abbey, Mainz from 1564 to 1566. His uncle, Daniel Brendel von Homburg was Archbishop of Mainz, and sent him to the Collegium Germanicum in Rome. There, he became friends with Johannes Busaeus, who was later a Jesuit theologian teaching at the University of Mainz.

After his return to Mainz, the papal legate Giovanni Morone appointed him prior of Stiftes St. Peter vor Mainz. He became a Domkapitular in 1582, then became schoolmaster in 1584. He was dean of St. Alban's Abbey by 1588, and then dean of the Marienstiftes in 1599. From 1584 to 1595 he served as Vicar General of the Elector-Archbishop of Mainz. He became the chamberlain (treasurer) of the Archbishopric in 1599.

=== Elector, 1604–1626 ===
Following the death of Johann Adam von Bicken, the cathedral chapter of Mainz Cathedral elected Johann Schweikhard von Kromberg as the new Archbishop of Mainz on February 17, 1604 with the support of Rudolf II, Holy Roman Emperor, who feared that the election of the rival candidate, Julius Echter von Mespelbrunn, Bishop of Würzburg would destabilize relations with the Protestants of the Holy Roman Empire. After Pope Clement VIII confirmed his election, he was consecrated as archbishop in November 1604. The Archbishop-Elector of Mainz was also archchancellor of Germany and, as such, ranked first among all ecclesiastical and secular princes of the Empire.

He completed the work of the Counter-Reformation in the Archbishopric of Mainz that had been begun by his predecessors. He adopted a moderate religious-political attitude that was willing to compromise. He did not persecute Protestants, however, and maintained the religious freedom of Erfurt. In 1605 the Mainz "Catholisch Cantual" was published as part of the "Catholic Manual" with Bible texts, catechism, mass treatises and Catholic worship songs as a response to Protestant spiritual chants. He supported the work of the Jesuits and Capuchins. He was enfeoffed with the regalia and imperial fiefs on August 13, 1613 at the Reichstag in Regensburg.

He commissioned the Schloss Johannisburg, which was built in Aschaffenburg from 1605 to 1614. Under his reign the old arsenal building was finished. Witch trials were revived in 1615.

Johann Schweikhard von Kronberg opposed the intervention of Henry IV of France in the War of the Jülich succession in 1609. In 1612 crowned Matthias, Holy Roman Emperor in the Bartholomäuskirche. In 1618, he opposed the decision of Frederick V, Elector Palatine to accept the Bohemian Crown, but he also opposed the Spanish occupation of the Electorate of the Palatinate. In the imperial election of 1619, he played a significant role in the election of Ferdinand II.

He died in Aschaffenburg on September 17, 1626.

Catholic Church titles
Preceded by Johann Adam von Bicken	Archbishop of Mainz; 1604 – 1626	Succeeded by Georg Friedrich von Greiffenklau
