= Martin Baldwin Kittel =

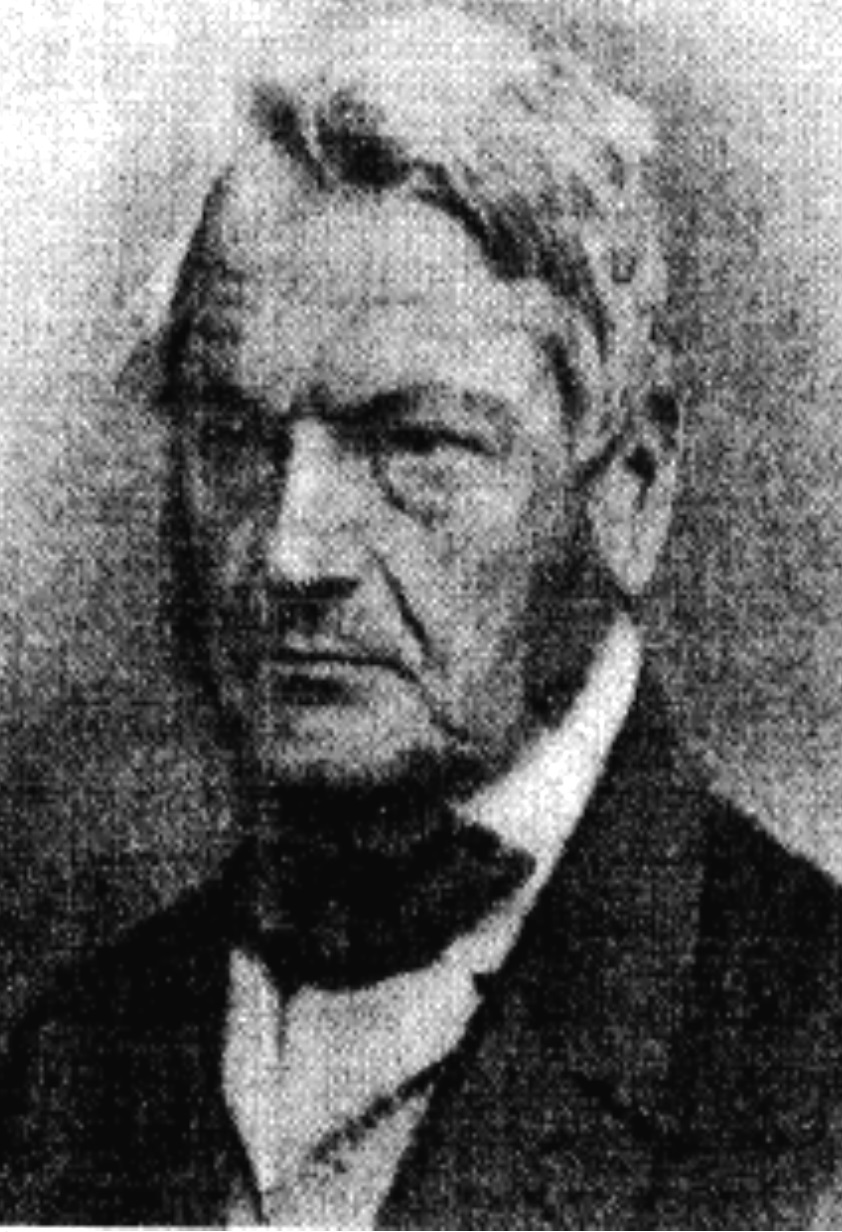
Martin Baldwin Kittel

Martin Baldwin Kittel (6 January 1796/97/98 – 1885) known as Martin Balduin, and Baldwin Martin, was born in Aschaffenburg on 6 January, the year given variously as 1796, 1797 or 1798, in "humble circumstances". He passed his baccalaureate in 1816, and enrolled to study philosophy at the University of Würzburg. He was made a Doctor of Medicine in Munich in 1822, although he never practiced as a doctor. Three years later, he travelled to Paris to study science, and in 1831 was appointed professor at the Lyceum Aschaffenburger, where he remained until his retirement in 1873. A man of great industry, he also applied himself to the study of botany, geology, local history, and art history.

He married Hulda Wilhelmine Leske (1819-1842); they had one child, a daughter, Petra Katharina. A man noted for his humility, Kittel died on 24 July 1885, and was buried in the old town cemetery in Aschaffenburg.

== Publications ==
- (1847). Taschenbuch der Flora Deutschlands nach dem Linneischen Systeme geordnet. J. L. Schrag, Nuremberg.
- (1876). History of the City of Obemburg (in German).
