= Stefan Andriopoulos =

German academic

Stefan Andriopoulos (born 1968, Aschaffenburg, Germany) is professor in the Department of Germanic Languages and co-founder and former co-director of the Center for Comparative Media at Columbia University.

He is the author of Ghostly Apparitions: German Idealism, the Gothic Novel, and Optical Media (Zone Books 2013), which analyzes the constitutive role of spiritualism for the history of philosophy and technology. It was named a book of the year in Times Literary Supplement and has also been published in German and Brazilian Portuguese translation. The Frankfurter Allgemeine Zeitung described its readings of Kant, Hegel, Schiller, and Schopenhauer as "persuasive, precise, and elegant." His previous book Possessed: Hypnotic Crimes, Corporate Fiction, and the Invention of Cinema (University of Chicago Press 2008) was awarded the Society for Literature, Science, and the Arts' 2009 Michelle Kendrick Award for best academic book on science, literature, and the arts. He has held visiting professorships at Harvard University, in the Department of the History of Science, and at Cologne University, in the Research Institute "Media, Culture, Communication." His academic focus is on media history and intersections of literature and science. Stefan Andriopoulos is also a recipient of the Columbia Distinguished Faculty Award.
