= Arsenal, Mainz =

Building in Germany

Coordinates: 50°0′16″N 8°16′19″E

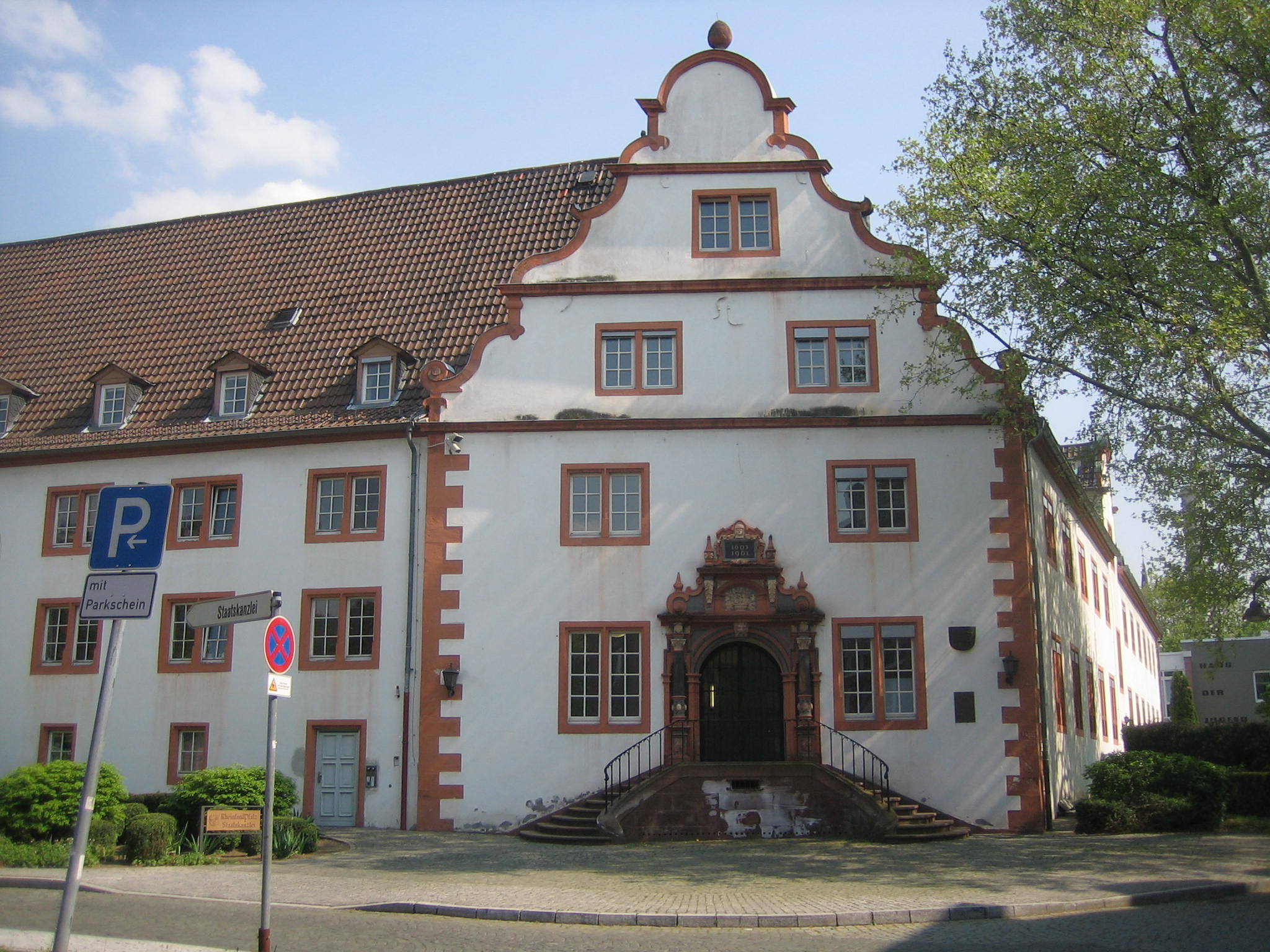
Old Arsenal, Mainz

The Old Arsenal (Altes Zeughaus), also referred to as Zum Sautanz, was the central arsenal of the fortress of Mainz during the 17th and 18th century. In his function it was succeeded by the new arsenal. Currently the renaissance building is used by the Rhineland-Palatinate state chancellery and the Landtag of Rhineland-Palatinate.

== History ==
The arsenal was erected during the years 1604 and 1605 under the reign of Prince-elector and Archbishop of Mainz Johann Adam von Bicken (1601–1604) and Johann Schweikhard von Kronberg (1604–1626) at the site of a former electoral piggery, thus the deduced housename Zum Sautanz (to the dancing pigs). The arsenal was constructed as a three winged building opened to the east, where the city wall alongside the rhine river was located. The main wing refrains compared to the side wings. The prominent external spiral staircase dominates the internal court. It is domed by a Welsche Haube (Welsch canopy). Archbishop Bickens coat of arms are to be found at the entrance arch of the tower. Both side wings finish with their city side with rich decorated dutch gables.

Larger pieces of cannons were stored in the ground floor, which could be accessed by ramps. Small arms and ammunition were stored in the upper floor. The building was constructed in rubble work, window and door jambs are executed in cut stone of Buntsandstein.

At the open court side the new arsenal was erected in baroque architecture since 1738 by Johann Maximilian von Welsch. The old arsenal was used since 1770 as electoral mint.

== Current use ==
The building had been heavily damaged during the bombing of Mainz in World War II and totally worn out. After the reconstruction in 1951–52 initiated by the administration of the French allied forces the building was used by the Südwestfunk Mainz, a predecessor of the Südwestrundfunk, which provided regional public broadcasting. Today the building is used by the state chancellery of Rhineland-Palatinate and parts of the administration of the Landtag of Rhineland-Palatinate.
