= Aschaffenburg =

- Town
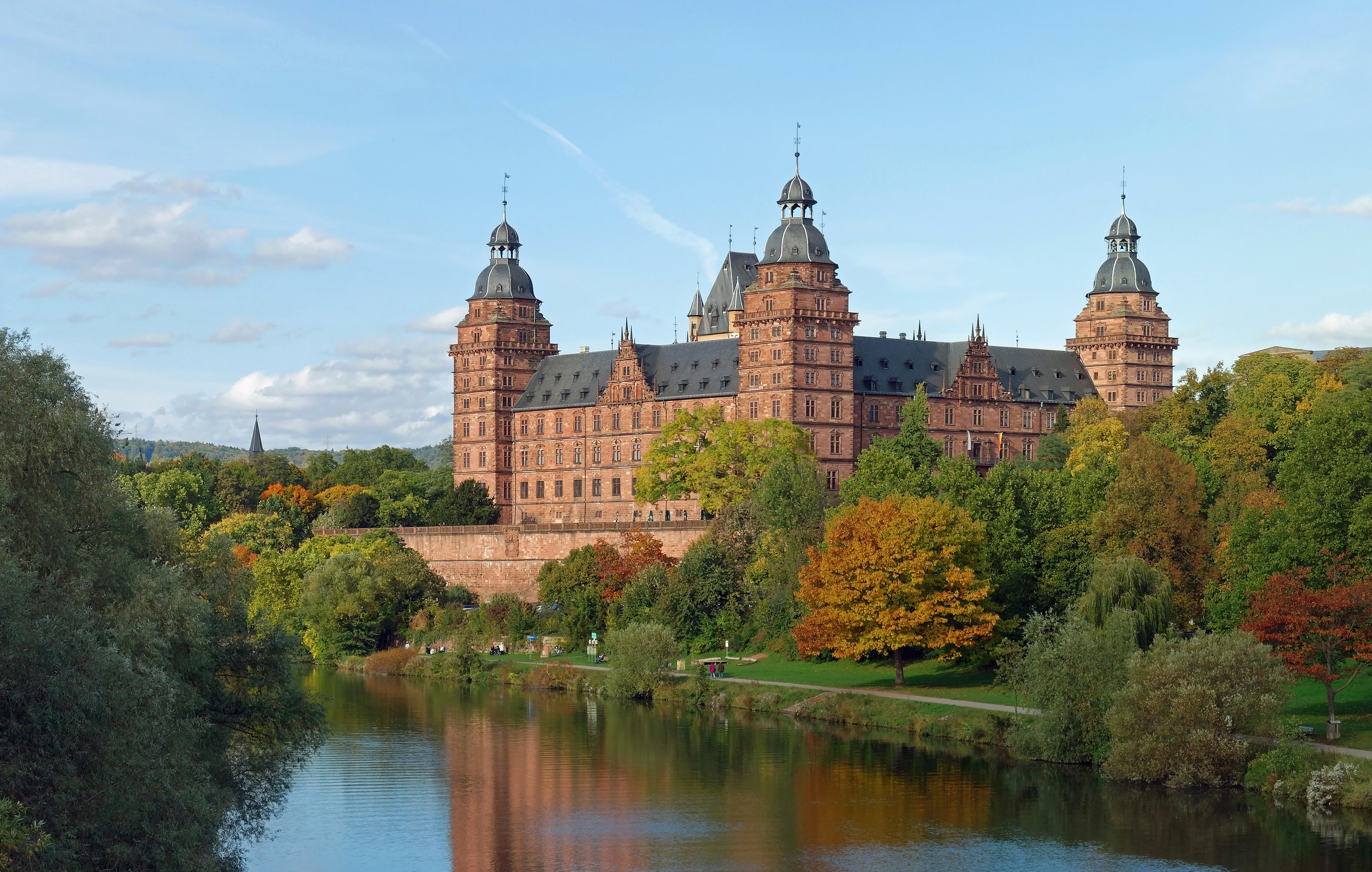
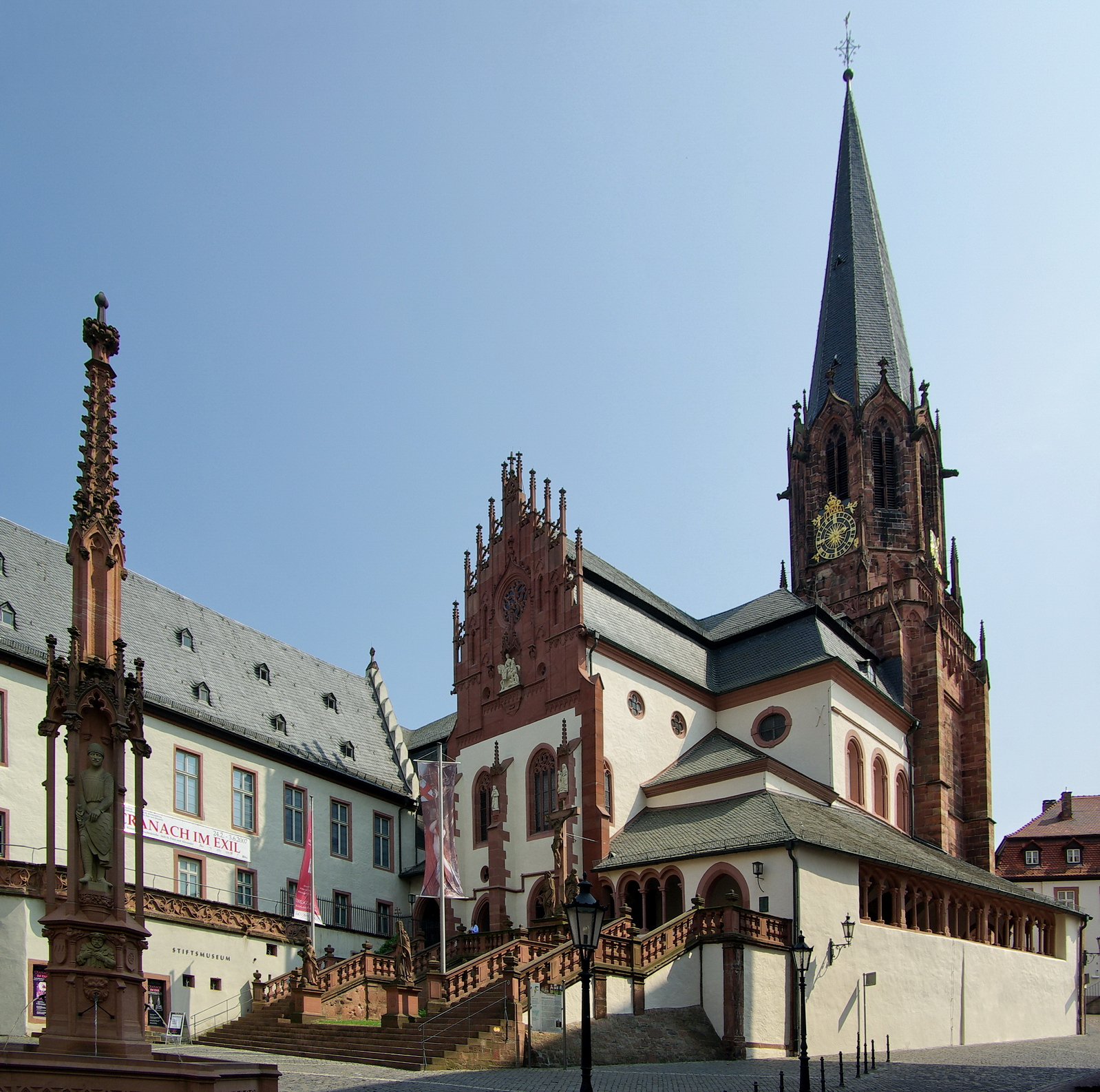
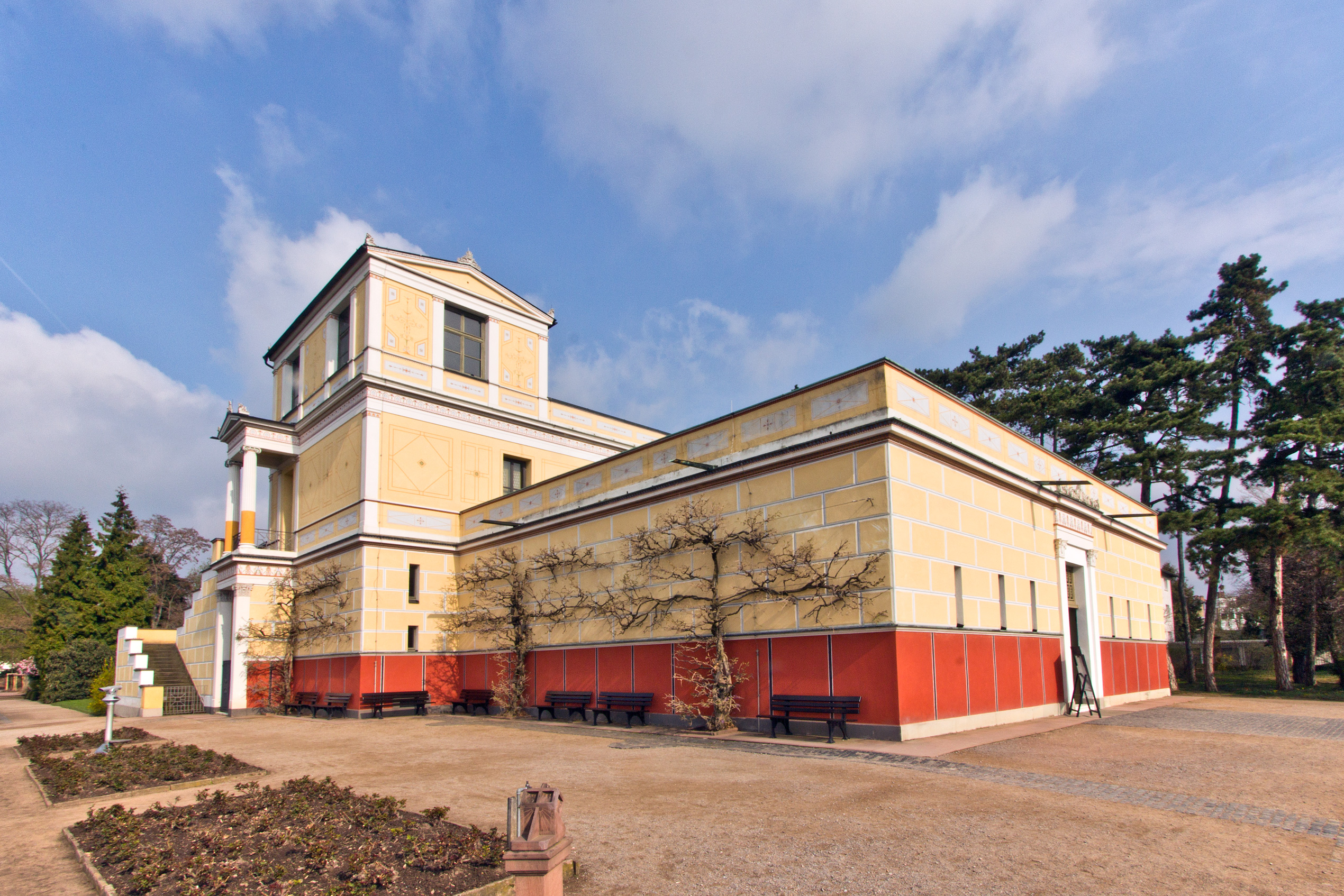
- Schloss Johannisburg on the river Main St. Peter und Alexander Pompejanum

- Flag Coat of arms
- Interactive map of Aschaffenburg
- Location within Germany Location within Bavaria
- Coordinates: 49°58′N 9°09′E
- Country: Germany
- State: Bavaria
- Admin. region: Lower Franconia
- District: Urban district
- Subdivisions: 10 districts

Government
  - Mayor (2026–32): Markus Schlemmer (CSU)

Area
  - Total: 62.45 km^{2} (24.11 sq mi)
- Elevation: 138 m (453 ft)

Population (2025-12-31)
  - Total: 73,326
  - Density: 1,174/km^{2} (3,041/sq mi)
- Time zone: UTC+01:00 (CET)
  - Summer (DST): UTC+02:00 (CEST)
- Postal codes: 63739–63743
- Dialling codes: 06021, 06028 (Obernau)
- Vehicle registration: AB
- Website: www.aschaffenburg.de

Aschaffenburg in Bavaria

Aschaffenburg (German pronunciation: [aˈʃafn̩bʊʁk]; Hessian: Aschebersch, pronounced [ˈaʒəˌbɛːʃ]) is a town in northwest Bavaria, Germany. The town of Aschaffenburg, despite being its administrative seat, is not part of the district of Aschaffenburg.

Aschaffenburg belonged to the Archbishopric of Mainz for more than 800 years. The town is located at the westernmost border of Lower Franconia and separated from the central and eastern part of the Regierungsbezirk (administrative region) by the Spessart hills, whereas it opens towards the Rhine-Main plain in the west and the north-west. Therefore, the inhabitants speak neither Bavarian nor East Franconian but rather a local version of Rhine Franconian.

== Geography ==
=== Location ===
The town is located on both sides of the Main in north-west Bavaria, bordering to Hesse. On a federal scale it is part of central Germany, just 41 kilometers (25 mi) southeast of Frankfurt am Main. In the western part of the municipality, the smaller Aschaff flows into the Main. The region is also known as Bayerischer Untermain ("Bavarian Lower Main").

=== Climate ===
The climate is continental, typically with warm, dry summers and cold, damp winters. Aschaffenburg usually receives less snowfall during the winter than the nearby Spessart.

=== Subdivision ===
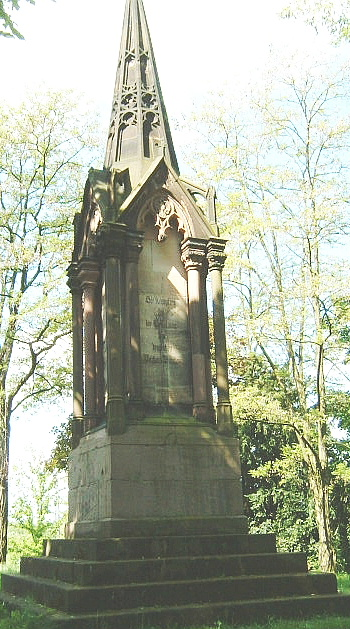
Austrian memorial in the Österreicher Kolonie

Aschaffenburg comprises 10 Stadtteile:

- Damm
- Gailbach
- Leider
- Nilkheim
- Obernau
- Obernauer Kolonie (Obernauer Colony)
- Österreicher Kolonie (Austrian Colony)
- Schweinheim
- Stadtmitte (town center)
- Strietwald

Nilkheim and Leider are the only Stadtteile that are located on the left bank of the river Main.

=== Neighbouring communities ===
The following municipalities border Aschaffenburg (clockwise, from the north): Johannesberg, Glattbach, Goldbach, Haibach, Bessenbach, Sulzbach am Main, Niedernberg, Großostheim, Stockstadt am Main and Mainaschaff.

== History ==
=== Etymology ===
The name Aschaffenburg (Ascaffaburc, Ascapha or Ascaphaburg in the Middle Ages) originally meant "castle at the ash tree river" deriving from the river Aschaff that runs through parts of the town.

=== Pre-history to Middle Ages ===
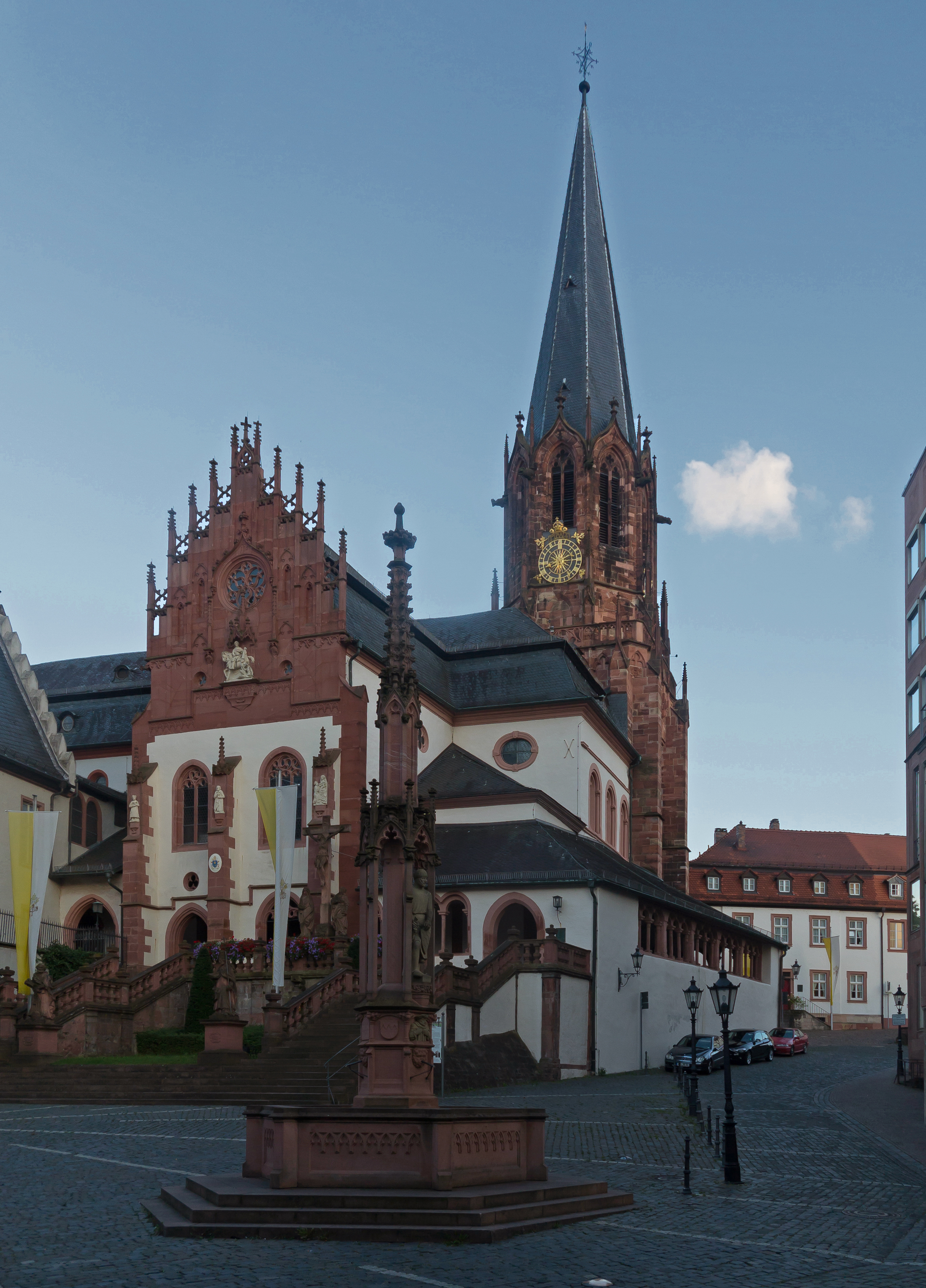
Kollegiatstift St. Peter und Alexander

The earliest remains of settlements in the area of Aschaffenburg date from the Stone Age.

Aschaffenburg was originally a settlement of the Alamanni. Roman legions were stationed here. In c. 700 AD, the Ravenna Cosmography names two settlements in the region: Uburzis (Würzburg) and Ascapha (Aschaffenburg).

Around 550, the area had been conquered by the Franks, and their Hausmeier built a castle here. In the 8th century, a Benedictine monastery was founded, dedicated to St. Michael, reportedly by Saint Boniface. This became the Kollegiatstift St. Peter und Alexander in the second half of the 10th century (957). In 869, King Louis the Younger married Liutgard of Saxony at Aschaffenburg. She also died here in 885 and was later laid to rest with her daughter Hildegard in the Stiftskirche. Ascaffinburg is mentioned first in 974 in a gift document by Otto II, in which he gave several villages including Wertheim am Main and a stretch of forest in the Spessart to the collegiate church.

In the Middle Ages the town was known as Ascaffaburc, Ascapha or Ascaphaburg. A stone bridge over the Main was reportedly built by Archbishop Willigis in 989, who also made the town his second residence. The town (referred to in 975 as a civitas) was part of the Archbishopric of Mainz from 982, when Duke Otto died. A Vizedom is mentioned for the first time in 1122 as the top local representative of the Archbishop. In 1292 a synod was held here, and in 1447 an imperial diet, preliminary to that of Vienna, approved a concordat (sometimes called the Aschaffenburg Concordat). In the German Peasants' War (1525), the town backed the losing side.

=== Modern times through 19th century ===
In 1552, the late-Gothic castle of Johannisburg was destroyed. It was replaced in 1605-14 by the Renaissance Schloss Johannisburg. The town suffered greatly during the Thirty Years' War, being held in turn by the various belligerents. During the Battle of Dettingen (1743), which took place to the north, the town was occupied by French troops. It formed part of the electorate of the Archbishop of Mainz, and in 1803 was made over to Archbishop Karl Theodor von Dalberg as the Principality of Aschaffenburg.

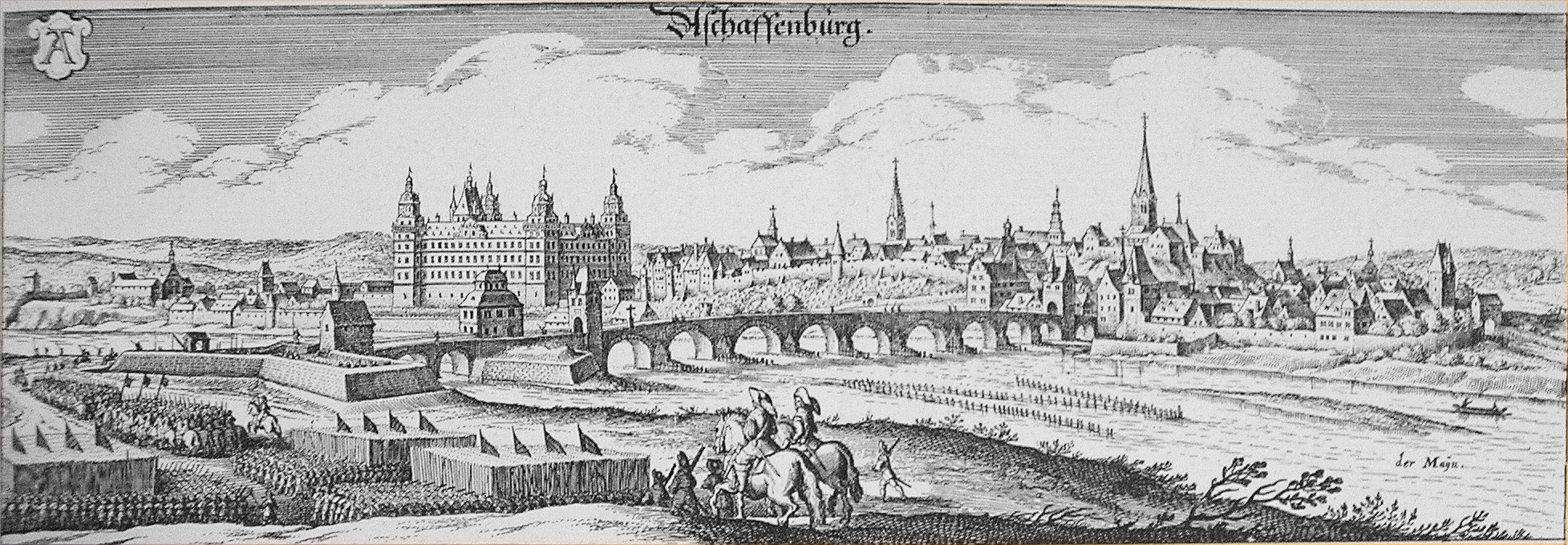
Aschaffenburg, by Matthäus Merian

Aschaffenburg was the site of the "Forstliche Hochschule Aschaffenburg" (Königlich Bayerische Centralforstlehranstalt), established in 1807, "made famous by the researches of Professor Dr Ernst Ebermayer." The academy was "dissolved in 1832, but re-organized under the Ministry of Finance in 1874"; and, as "of 30th March, 1874, united to the University of Munich (now LMU Munich)."

In 1810, the Principality of Aschaffenburg was merged into the new Grand Duchy of Frankfurt although Dalberg retained Aschaffenburg as his residence. In 1814, the town was transferred to the Kingdom of Bavaria by an Austrian-Bavarian treaty. In 1817 it was included within Bavarian Lower Franconia. From 1840 to 1848, King Ludwig I of Bavaria had a Roman villa built to the west of town. It was named Pompejanum after its model, the house of Castor and Pollux at Pompeii.

During the Austro-Prussian War, the Prussian Army inflicted a severe defeat on the Grand Duchy of Hesse near Aschaffenburg in the Battle of Frohnhofen on 13 July 1866.

=== World War II ===
In World War II, Aschaffenburg was heavily damaged by Allied area bombing, including Schloss Johannisburg, which was completely restored several years later. The German military chose to defend Aschaffenburg strongly during the last weeks of the war, which resulted in the Battle of Aschaffenburg fought 28 March – 3 April 1945. The U.S. 45th Infantry Division was forced to take the fortified town against stiff German resistance in a series of frontal assaults that involved house-to-house fighting and vicious close combat. The resulting widespread urban destruction was quite severe, as cannon fire was used point-blank to blast through structures.

=== Aschaffenburg displaced persons camps ===
At the end of World War II, the United States Army occupied military facilities that had been used and controlled by the Wehrmacht. These were converted for use by U.S. military personnel as processing centres for displaced persons at the end of the war. From 1945, 7,000 Ukrainians were accommodated in four displaced persons camps:

- Artillerie Kaserne – approx. 2,000 people (1945–1949)
- Bois Brulé Kaserne – 1,500 people (1946–1949)
- LaGarde Kaserne – 1,700 people (1945–1949)
- Pionier Kaserne – 2,000 people (1946–1949)

Two other camps, Alte (old) Kaserne and Jäger Kaserne housed mainly Poles and Lithuanians.

=== Post-war development ===
In the decades following the war, Aschaffenburg and the surrounding region experienced robust economic prosperity, partially due to its close proximity to Frankfurt am Main.

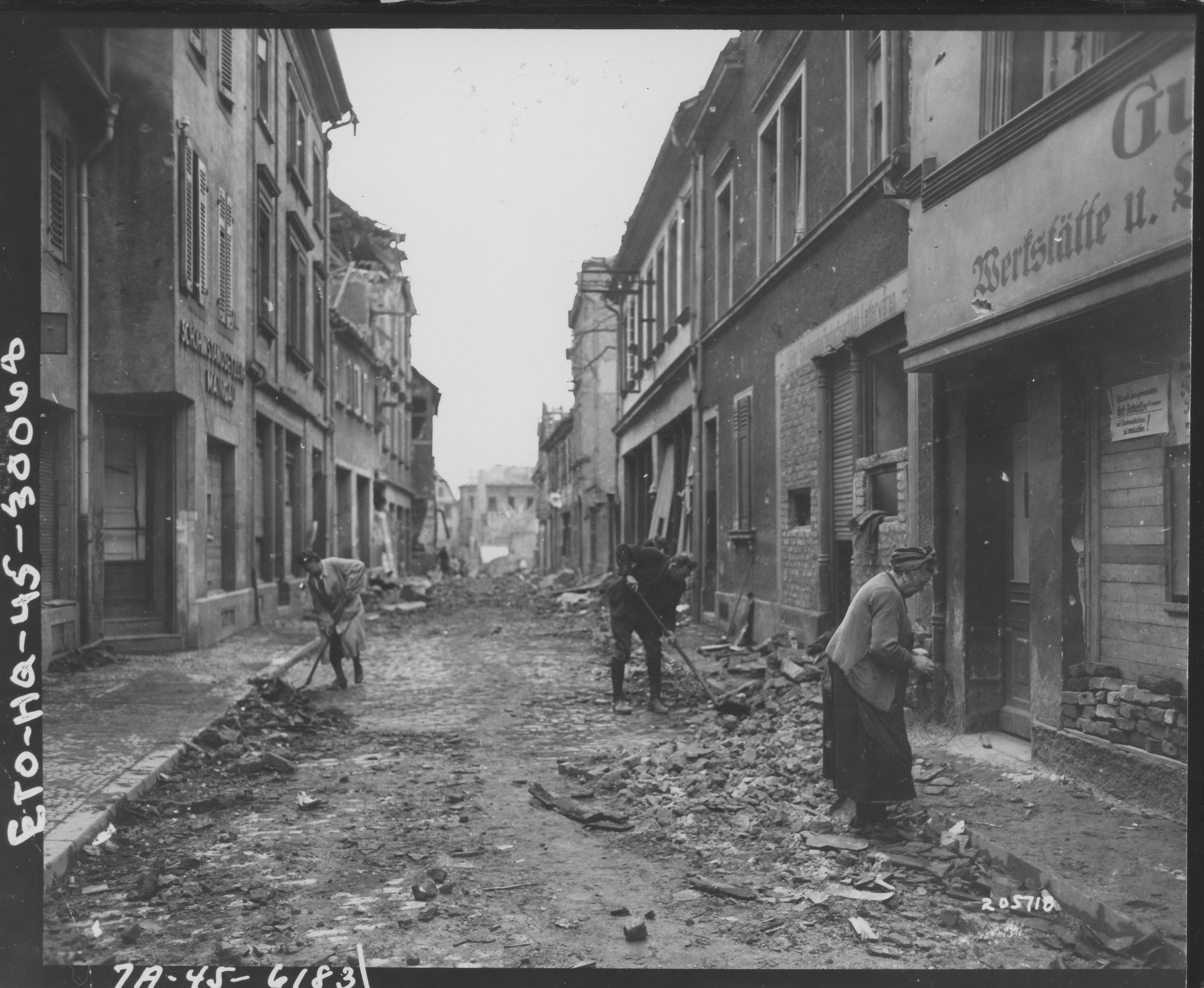
Civilians clearing away the rubble, 3 April 1945

According to an online 2002 survey in Stern magazine, [Stern 14/2002], 82 percent of residents living in the Bayerischer Untermain region where Aschaffenburg is located were satisfied with the place where they lived. This was the highest level recorded in the survey, making the region the #1 place to live in Germany, based on several factors including employment opportunities in the region, educational facilities, public services, transportation, recreational options, shopping, cultural facilities/events, climate, etc.

Another survey taken in 2006 by McKinsey, Stern magazine, ZDF, and web.de again showed that Aschaffenburg has one of the highest ratings for quality of life in Germany.

In January 2025, two people were killed in the 2025 Aschaffenburg stabbing, a knife attack by an Afghan asylum seeker in the Schöntal park.

=== U.S. military presence (1945–2007) ===
Aschaffenburg was the location of several United States Army installations throughout the Cold War. After initially taking over the administration of the ex-Wehrmacht installations, which were then used as displaced persons camps, the American presence in the Aschaffenburg military community began after general renovations in 1948. The installation sites were known as Ready Kaserne (previously Artillerie Kaserne), Smith Kaserne (previously LaGarde Kaserne), Graves Kaserne (previously Bois Brulé Kaserne), Fiori Kaserne (previously Pionier Kaserne), and Jaeger Kaserne (previously Jäger Kaserne). These housed armour, infantry, engineer, maintenance and artillery elements of the U.S. Army 3rd Brigade, 3rd Infantry Division and various VII Corps elements including the 9th Engineer Battalion, the 3rd Bn 21st Field Artillery (Honest John), and the 1st Bn 80th Field Artillery (LANCE). Much of the U.S. Army presence in Aschaffenburg ended in 1992 with the ending of the Cold War. The last buildings, which were primarily used for housing, were handed back to the local government in 2007.

== Demographics ==
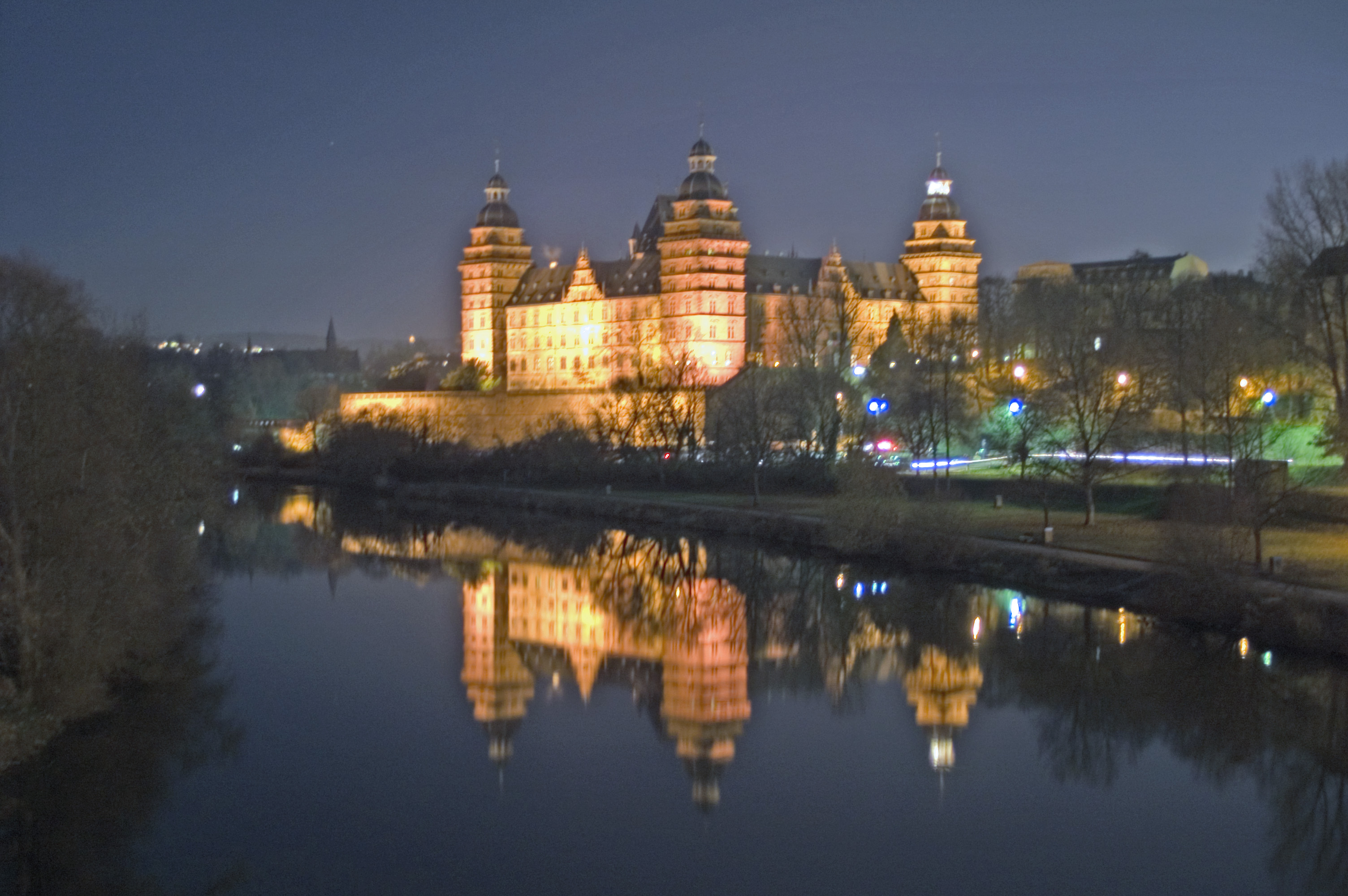
Schloss Johannisburg reflected in the river Main at night

=== Population ===
Year	Population
1900	18,093
1910	29,892
1925	34,056
1939	45,379
1945	30,861
1946	36,383
1950	45,499

Year	Population
1961	54,131
1970	55,193
1980	59,257
1987	60,964
1990	64,098
1995	66,360
2000	67,592

Year	Population
2003	68,607
2007	68,646
2010	68,648
2015	68,986

=== Age distribution of the population (as of 2007) ===
Age	Population
0-19	13,888
20-39	19,505
40-59	18,951
60+	16,556

== Governance ==
=== Lord Mayors ===
- Wilhelm Matt (1872–1936) (BVP) (1904–1933)
- Wilhelm Wohlgemuth (1900–1978) (NSDAP) (1933–1945)
- Jean Stock (1893–1965) (SPD) (1945)
- Vinzenz Schwind (1910–1974) (1945–1970)
- Willi Reiland (1933–2015) (SPD) (1970–2000)
- Klaus Herzog (born 1951) (SPD) (2000–2020)
- Jürgen Herzing (born 1960) (SPD) (2020–2026)
- Markus Schlemmer (born 1968) (CSU) (since 2026)

== Economy ==
In 2017 (latest data available) the GDP per inhabitant was €69,928. This places the district 9th out of 96 districts (rural and urban) in Bavaria (overall average: €46,698).

Well-known companies in Aschaffenburg are (e.g.): Linde Material Handling, Linde Hydraulics, Joyson Safety Systems (former Petri AG) and part of Joyson Electronics as well as DPDgroup.

=== Shopping ===
The City Galerie, opened in 1974 and located in the central part of the city, is the largest shopping mall in northern Bavaria. It was one of the first indoor shopping malls in Germany. Aschaffenburg also has a pedestrian shopping zone closed to motor vehicles, except for deliveries.

== Politics ==
Aschaffenburg is part of the Aschaffenburg constituency for elections to the Bundestag.

== Arts and culture ==
=== Cultural events ===
Aschaffenburg hosts numerous festivals, fairs, exhibitions, markets and concerts throughout the year including the annual Stadtfest, held on the last weekend in August.

=== Theaters and entertainment venues ===
- Colos-Saal, a live-music club
- Erthaltheater
- f.a.n. Frankenstolz Arena (formerly Unterfrankenhalle)
- Kabarett im Hofgarten
- Ludwigstheater
- Stadthalle am Schloss
- Stadttheater (town theater)
- Zimmertheater.

=== Museums and galleries ===
- Stiftsmuseum
- Naturwissenschaftliches Museum Aschaffenburg
- Gentilhaus
- KunstLANDing
- Städtische Galerie "Kunsthalle Jesuitenkirche"
- Neuer Kunstverein Aschaffenburg
- Künstlerhaus Walter Helm
- Christian Schad Museum (opened in May 2018)

=== Archaeological Spessart Projekt ===
The Archeological Spessart Project is a registered association, whose mission is to research and communicate facts about the cultural landscape of the Spessart. The organisation works closely with various universities and research institutes in a variety of scientific projects.

=== Library and archive ===
- Stadtbibliothek Aschaffenburg (Aschaffenburg town library)
- Stadt- und Stiftsarchiv Aschaffenburg (Aschaffenburg town archive)

=== Cinemas ===
- Kinopolis, a modern multiplex cinema
- Casino

=== Recreation ===
A large recreational complex is located in the Stadtteil of Leider. It includes an indoor and outdoor swimming pool complex as well as an indoor ice rink and tennis courts, which are open to the general public. There's also a marina on the Main between the Willigis and Adenauer bridges.

== Attractions ==
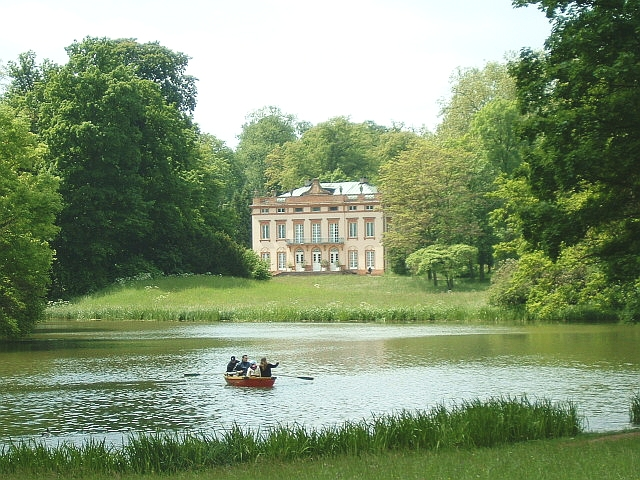
Schloss Schönbusch in Schönbusch Park

=== Sights ===
The main sights of Aschaffenburg are the Schloss Johannisburg, built 1605–1614 by Archbishop Johann Schweikhard von Kronberg, which contains a library with a number of incunabula, a collection of engravings and paintings; the Pompejanum, a replica of a Roman town house discovered in Pompeii commissioned by King Ludwig I. and opened in 1850; the St. Peter und Alexander collegiate church, founded in the second half of the 10th century, but dating in the main from the early 12th century on, in which are preserved various monuments by the Vischers, a sarcophagus with the relics of Saint Margaret, and a painting by Matthias Grünewald; the Capuchin hospital; a theatre, which was formerly a house of the Teutonic Order; several mansions of the nobility; and the historical old town. Across the river are the Park and Schloss Schönbusch.

The graves of Clemens Brentano and his brother Christian Brentano (died 1851) and that of Wilhelm Heinse can be found in the Altstadtfriedhof (Old Town Cemetery).

=== Parks ===
Aschaffenburg has numerous parks including the following:

- Schönbusch Park, located in Nilkheim
- Schöntal Park, located in the town center
- Aschaffenburger Schlossgarten, around Schloss Johannisburg
- Kleine Schönbuschallee

== Sports ==
=== Football ===
Viktoria Aschaffenburg is the primary football club. The club was formed on 24 June 1904 out of the merger of FC Aschaffenburg (6 August 1901) and FC Viktoria Aschaffenburg (12 April 1902). It was renamed Sportverein Viktoria 01 Aschaffenburg on 3 June 1906. Their homefield is Stadion am Schönbusch (Schönbusch stadium), a modern stadium located in Nilkheim.

=== American football ===
In 1991, the Aschaffenburg Stallions began playing American football at Schönbusch stadium. A cheerleader squad also exists.

=== Baseball and softball ===
Aschaffenburg is also home to the Aschaffenburg Mohawks Baseball and Softball team. The softball team won the 2010 German Championship. The adult baseball team won the 2011 Landesliga South Championship and will play in the highest league of the state Hessen in 2012.

== Infrastructure ==
=== Transport ===
==== Roads ====
Aschaffenburg is located on Bundesautobahn 3 between Frankfurt am Main and Würzburg. The southern terminus of Bundesautobahn 45 is located just west of the town. Bundesstrasse B 26 passes through the town. Bundestrasse B 8 used to pass through Aschaffenburg, but has now been rerouted along the Bundesautobahn 3. Three road bridges cross the river Main at Aschaffenburg: Friedrich Ebert Bridge (a new span opened in 2008), Willigis Bridge and Konrad Adenauer Bridge. In the 1980s, a road tunnel was constructed under the Schlossplatz to improve traffic flow through the Stadtmitte (town center).

After 43 years of planning and construction, the limited-access Innenstadtring or "inner-town-ring" road was completed in July 2013. It allows motorists to bypass the Stadtmitte (town center) and reduces traffic congestion in Aschaffenburg, which has been a problem in recent years. Another road project called Bahnparallele is currently under construction, with a small section already opened. It is located in the Stadtteil of Damm and runs parallel to the railway tracks.

==== Parking ====
There are approximately 7,500 parking spaces in the ten Stadtteile of Aschaffenburg and eight public parking garages.

===== Public transport =====
Aschaffenburg has a comprehensive bus network serving the town and surrounding region. The 15 main bus lines which serve the Stadtteile of Aschaffenburg are run by Stadtwerke Aschaffenburg. There are several other bus lines which link Aschaffenburg with the surrounding region. Those lines are run by other companies, including the Deutsche Bahn. A new regional bus terminal opened in 2008, adjacent to the Aschaffenburg Hauptbahnhof (main railway station). The Regionale Omnibusbahnhof Aschaffenburg (ROB) was built to consolidate all of the scattered bus stops in the area around the main railway station into one central location and reduce traffic congestion in the area.

==== Railway stations and stops ====
- Aschaffenburg Hauptbahnhof/Aschaffenburg Central Station - The station has long-distance InterCityExpress and InterCity services as well as regional connections to neighboring towns and cities. A new, larger station building opened in 2011, replacing a smaller structure built in the 1950s.
- Aschaffenburg-Hochschule/University of Applied Sciences - The stop, located near Würzburger Straße, opened in 2007 to accommodate students attending nearby schools. It is positioned between Aschaffenburg Hauptbahnhof and Aschaffenburg-Süd/South. There is only a single track platform.
- Aschaffenburg-Süd/South
- Obernau
- Schönbusch-Nilkheim - The station closed when passenger service on the "Bachgaubahn" railway line ended in 1974.
- Leider - Freight railway terminal close to Aschaffenburg's port on the Main. There is no passenger service.

All passenger train service is provided by the Deutsche Bahn.

==== Harbor ====
Aschaffenburg has an active port along the Main in the Stadtteil of Leider. There is railway access to the port. In 2005, 2.8 million tons of cargo passed through the port.

==== Airports ====
A small general aviation airport (Flugplatz Aschaffenburg, ICAO-Code: EDFC) is located in nearby Großostheim. Frankfurt Airport is located 46 kilometers (29 mi) from Aschaffenburg and offers flights to destinations all over the world. The trip to and from the airport takes about 30 minutes by car or approximately 45 minutes by InterCityExpress train.

=== Medical ===
The three primary medical centers in Aschaffenburg are:

- Klinikum Aschaffenburg, the main hospital
- Hofgartenklinik
- Frauenklinik am Ziegelberg

There are approximately 789 hospital beds, 159 doctors, 68 dentists and 38 pharmacies in the Stadtteile of Aschaffenburg.

== Education ==
There are various types of schools in Aschaffenburg serving approximately 18,000 students from the town and surrounding region.

=== University ===
Hochschule Aschaffenburg is a university of applied sciences (or Fachhochschule).

== Media ==
=== Printed media ===
- Main-Echo, Aschaffenburg-based newspaper published daily except Sunday. This is the main newspaper for Aschaffenburg and the surrounding region. It was first published on 24 November 1945, replacing "Aschaffenburger Zeitung". It has a daily circulation of approximately 200,000 readers.
- Prima Sonntag, newspaper published only on Sunday
- FRIZZ Das Magazin, culture/scene magazine
- Brot & Spiele, culture magazine
- Szene Magazin

=== Radio and television ===
- Radio Primavera
- Radio Galaxy
- Main.tv - Das Primavera Fernsehen, Aschaffenburg programming

=== Internet ===
- www.main.tv - video-Website for Aschaffenburg (city and regional)
- Kommweichei.com e.V., the community and party scene in Aschaffenburg
- MainReporter.de - portal for Aschaffenburg (city and regional)
- abscene.de | Newgae magazine
- ABhörn, online Magazine
- Main-netz.de, news and community information for the region

== Notable people ==
=== Before 1900 ===
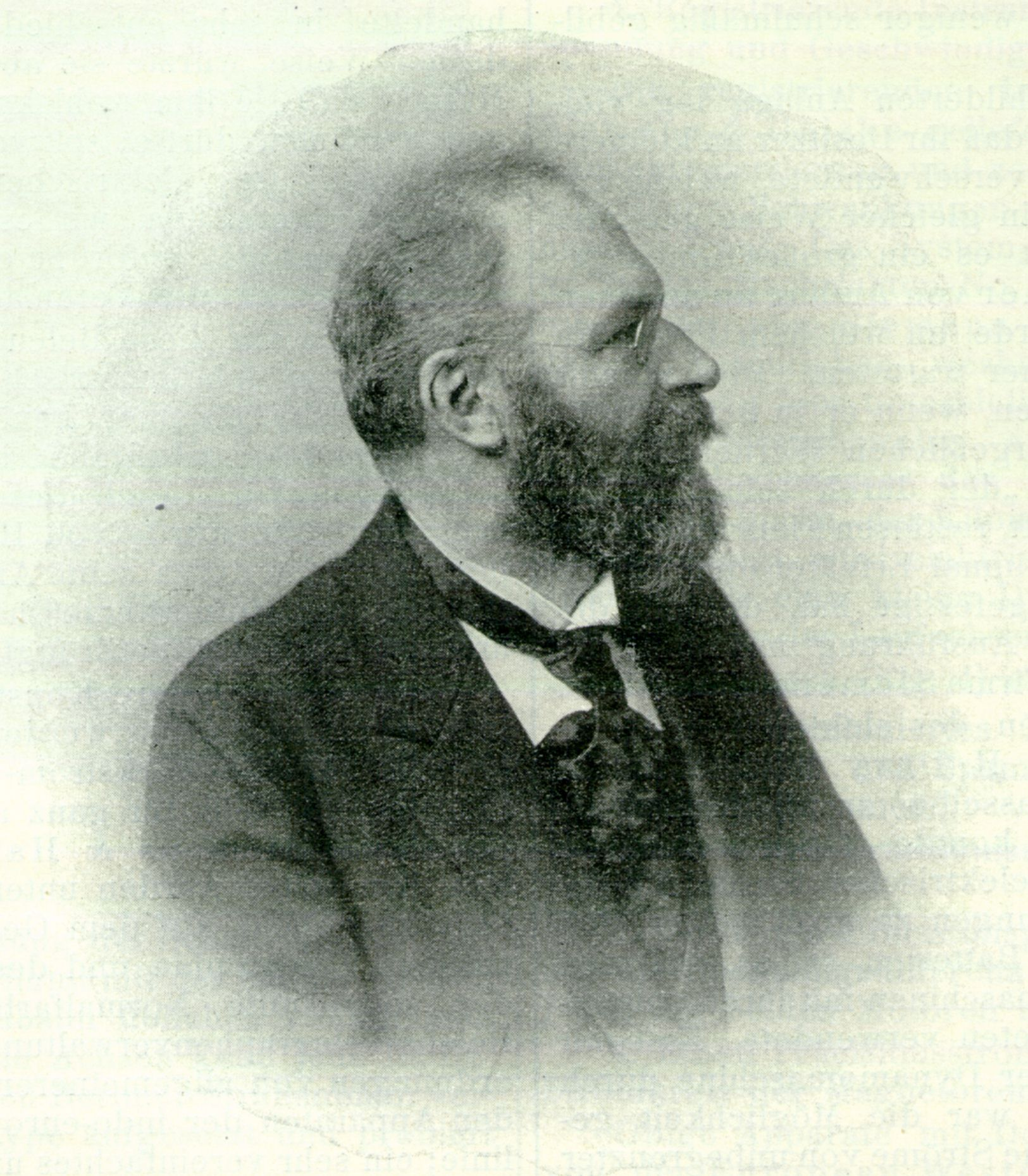
Hefner-Alteneck

- Daniel Brendel von Homburg (1523–1582), Archbishop of Mainz from 1555 to 1582
- Martin Baldwin Kittel (1798–1885), professor of Aschaffenburg Hochschule from 1831 to 1871
- Johann Joseph Scherer (1814–1869), chemist
- Joseph von Lindwurm (1824–1874), physician and dermatologist
- Lujo Brentano (1844–1931), economist and social reformer
- Friedrich von Hefner-Alteneck (1845–1904), electrical engineer
- Joseph Anton Schneiderfranken (1876–1943), painter and author
- Ernst Ludwig Kirchner (1880–1938), expressionist painter and printmaker
- Friedrich Dessauer (1881–1963), physicist, philosopher, socially engaged entrepreneur and journalist
- Hans Schmidt (1881–1916), priest executed for murder in the United States
- Alfons Maria Jakob (1884–1931), neurologist and neuropathologist
- Otto Gentil (1892–1969), painter and sculptor

=== 1900 to 1959 ===
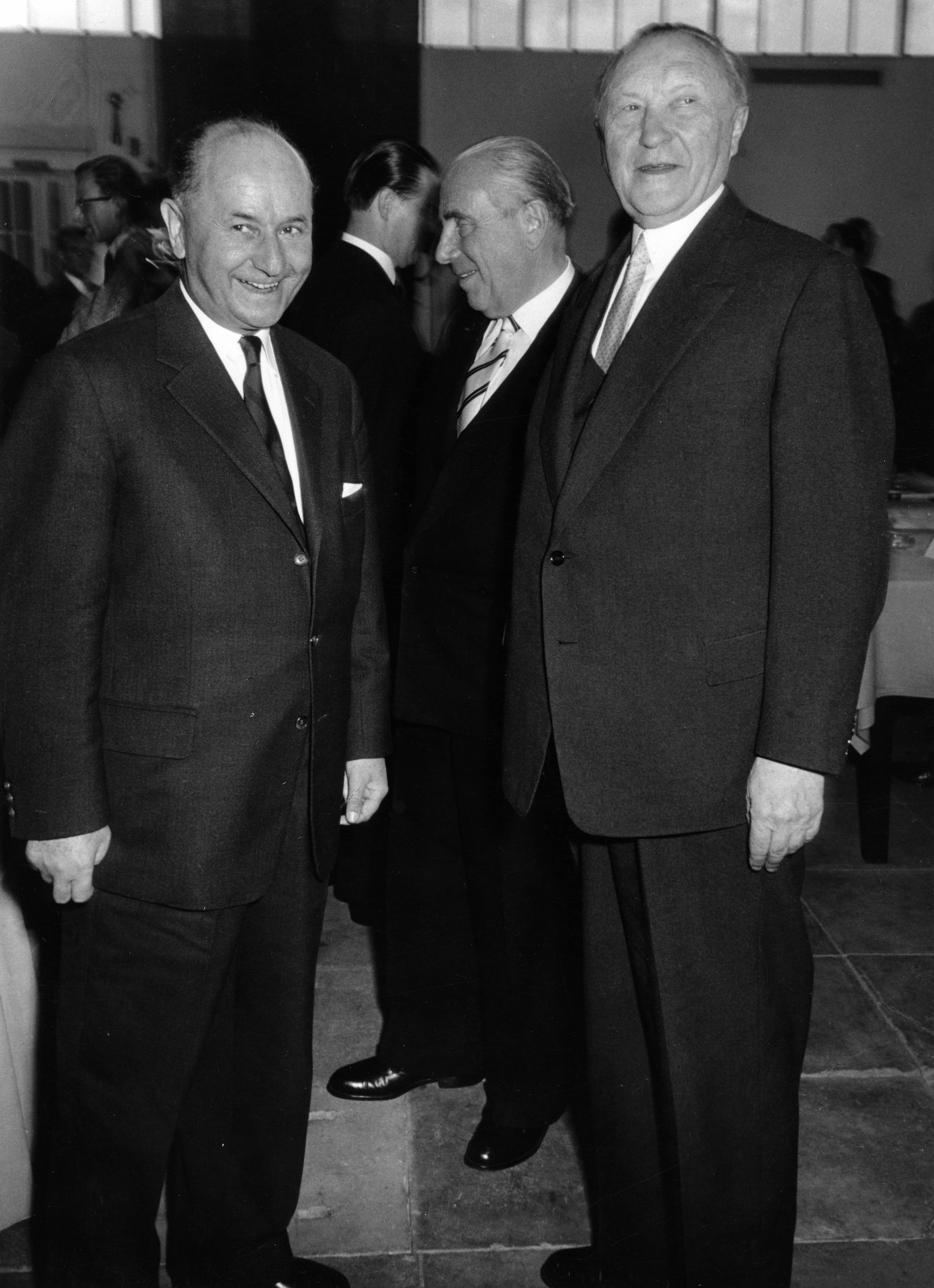
Hanns Seidel (left) in 1957 with Konrad Adenauer (right) at a CDU party convention

- Hanns Seidel (1901–1961), politician and Bavarian prime minister from 1957 to 1960
- Inge Viermetz (1908–1997), official and defendant at the Nuremberg Trials
- Guido Dessauer (1915–2012), physicist, business executive, art collector, patron of arts and academic
- Peter Gingold (1916–2006), figure in the German Resistance and the National Committee for a Free Germany
- Wilfried Hofmann (1931–2020), diplomat and author
- Adalbert Kraus (born 1937), tenor
- Felix Magath (born 1953), football player and manager
- Rudi Bommer (born 1957), football player and manager
- Dr. M. Grunebaum, Rechtsanwalt (Lawyer)

=== From 1960 ===
- Urban Priol (born 1961), cabaret artist and comedian
- Winfried Bausback (born 1965), politician
- Burkard Schliessmann, classical pianist and concert artist
- Stefan Andriopoulos (born 1968), professor and author
- Christian Hock (born 1970), football player and manager
- Pierre Hauck (born 1976), legal scholar
- Carlos Boozer (born 1981), American basketball player
- Sabine Englert (born 1981), handball player
- Marcel Schäfer (born 1984), footballer
- José Holebas (born 1984), Greek footballer
- Demond Greene (born 1981), German basketballer
- Anika Nilles (born, 1983), drummer
- Markus Neumayr (born 1986), footballer
- Ivo Iličević (born 1986), Croatian footballer
- Daria Kinzer (born 1988), Austrian-Croatian singer who represented Croatia in the Eurovision Song Contest 2011
- Patrick Amrhein (born 1989), footballer
- Paul Hill (born 1995), English rugby union player

=== Notable residents ===
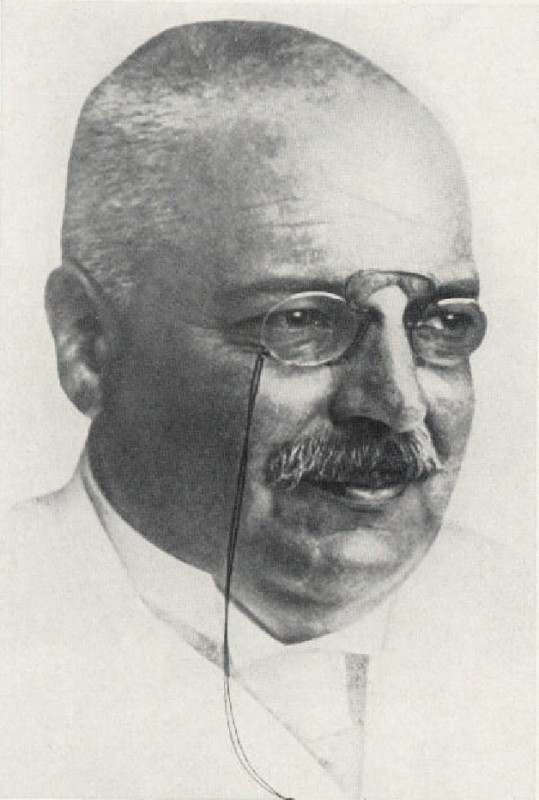
Alois Alzheimer

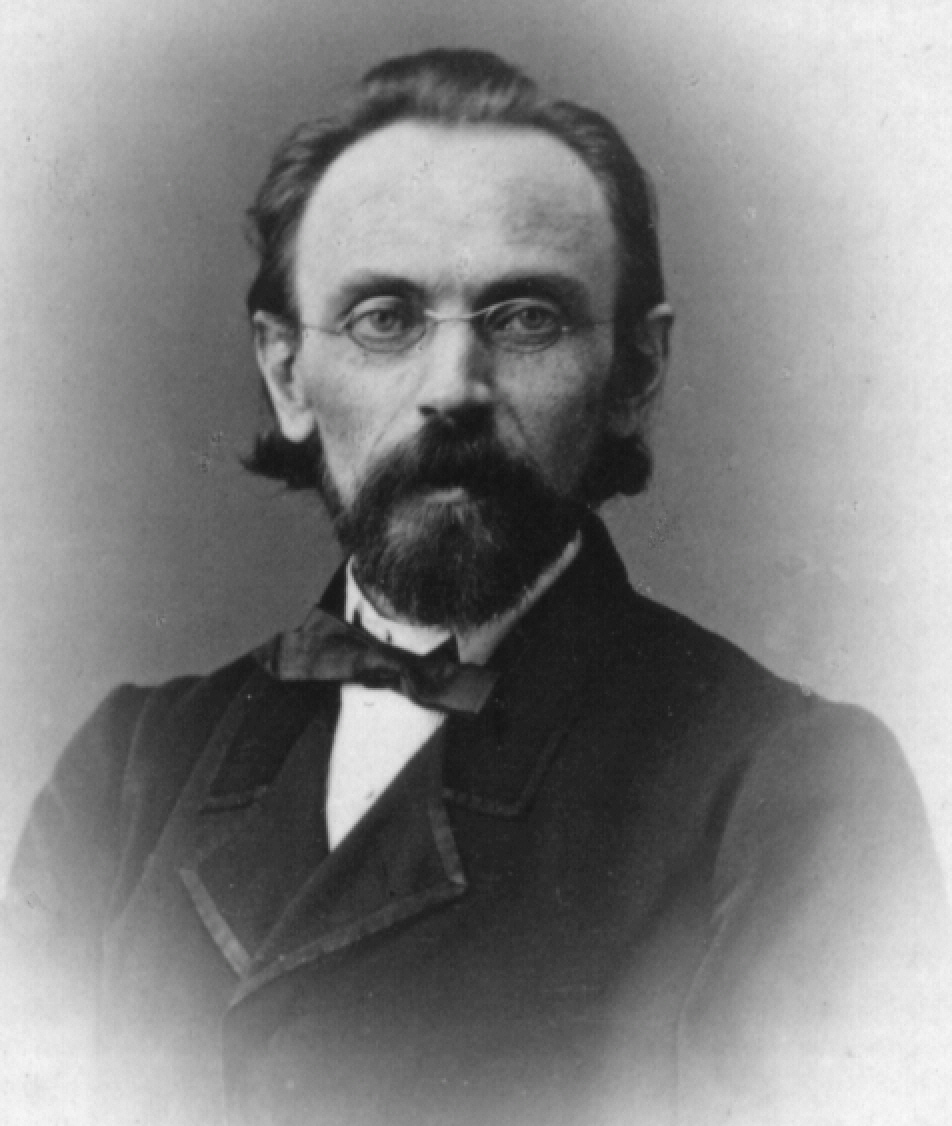
Emil Erlenmeyer around 1863

- Willigis (940–1011), Archbishop of Mainz
- Diether von Isenburg (1412–1482), Elector and Archbishop of Mainz
- Dietrich Schenk von Erbach (?–1459), Archbishop of Mainz
- Mathis Gothart-Nithart (c. 1475–1528), Renaissance painter of religious works
- Wolfgang von Dalberg (1538–1601), Archbishop of Mainz
- Johann Adam von Bicken (1564–1604), Archbishop of Mainz
- Johann Schweikard von Kronberg (1553–1626), Archbishop of Mainz, commissioned the Schloss Johannisburg
- Friedrich Karl Joseph von Erthal (1719–1802), prince-elector and archbishop of Mainz
- Karl Theodor Anton Maria von Dalberg (1744–1817), Archbishop-Elector of Mainz, Arch-Chancellor of the Holy Roman Empire, Prince of Regensburg
- Johann Jakob Wilhelm Heinse (1746–1803), author
- Clemens Brentano (1778–1842), poet and novelist
- Franz Bopp (1791–1867), linguist
- Emil Erlenmeyer (1825–1909), chemist
- Alois Alzheimer (1864–1915), psychiatrist and neuropathologist
- Ludwig Thoma (1867–1921), author, publisher and editor, studied forestry in Aschaffenburg
- Christian Schad (1894–1982), painter
- Hugo Karpf (1895–1994), politician (CSU), unionist, member of Reichstag and Bundestag
- Alfons Goppel (1905–1991), politician (CSU) and Prime Minister of Bavaria
- Ernst Lehner (1912–1986), footballer
- Guido Knopp (born 1948), journalist and author
- Otto Becker (born 1958), show jumping champion

== Twin towns – sister cities ==
Aschaffenburg is twinned with:

- Perth, Scotland, United Kingdom (1956)
- Saint-Germain-en-Laye, France (1975)
- Miskolc, Hungary (1996)
