= Otto Gentil =

German sculptor

Otto Gentil was born on 7 August 1892 at Aschaffenburg, Bayern, (Germany) where he died in 1969. He was a German sculptor and painter.

Otto Gentil was the son of the manufacturer of pumps and art collector Anton Gentil of Aschaffenburg. From 1926 till 1939 he was a teacher at the Aschaffenburg School of Arts. Otto married Johanna Gretel Niedermeier, daughter of Karl Niedermeier and Johanna Ney, on 8 March 1931 at Landau, Pfalz, Germany. After the Second World War he rebuilt his studio in his hometown and continued as a private artist of sculpture and painting.

A few of his sculptures have survived destruction in and around Aschaffenburg till today.
