= Wolfgang von Dalberg =

- Archbishop of Mainz
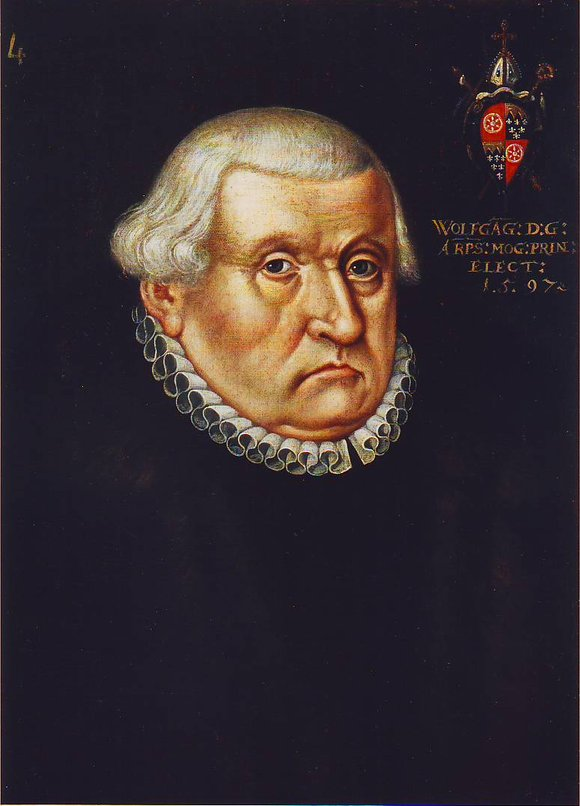
- Church: Catholic Church
- Diocese: Electorate of Mainz
- In office: 20 September 1582–5 April 1601

Personal details
- Born: 1538
- Died: 5 April 1601 (aged 62 or 63)

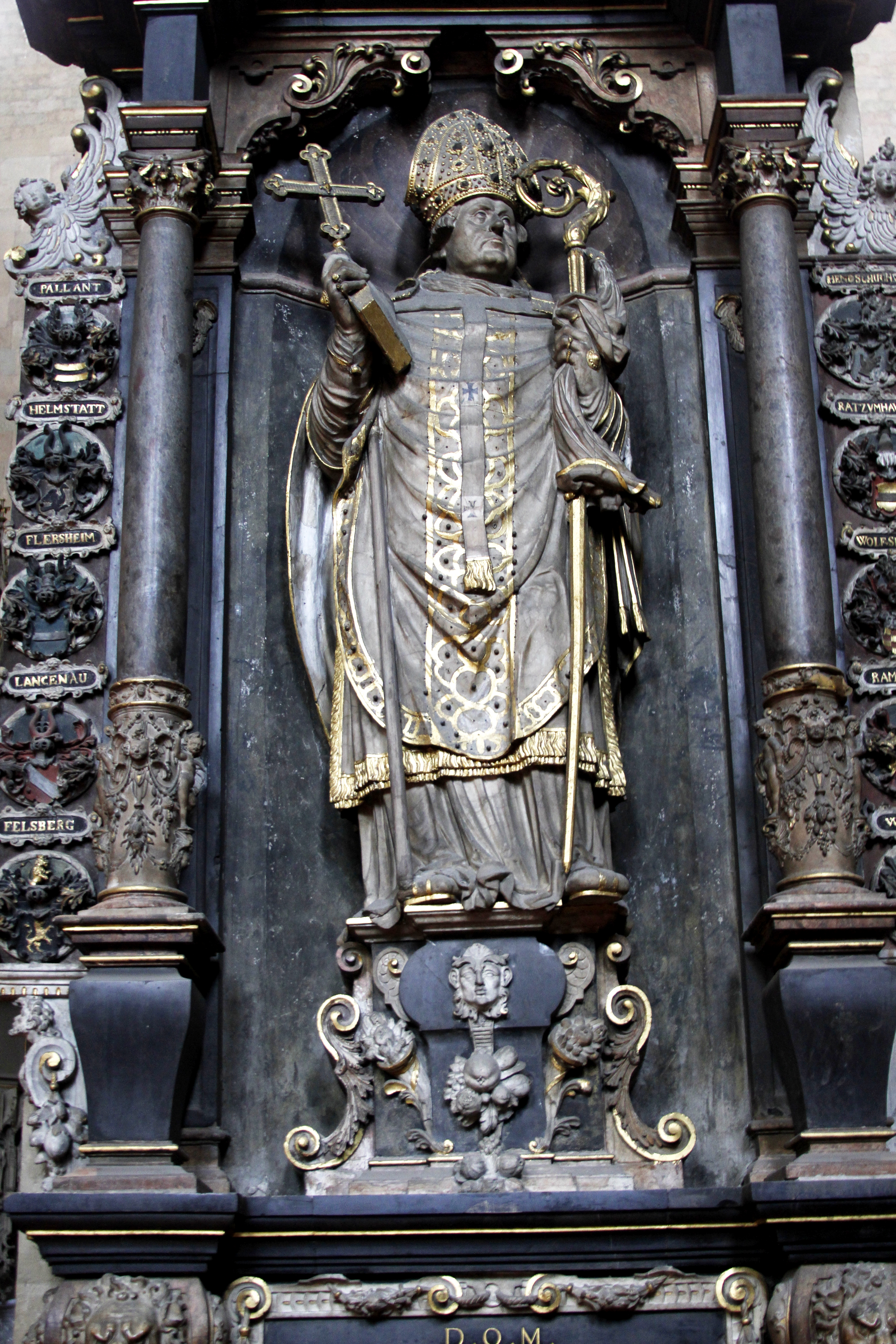
Epitaph in Mainz Cathedral

Wolfgang von Dalberg (1538 – April 5, 1601) was the Archbishop-Elector of Mainz from 1582 to 1601.

== Biography ==
Wolfgang von Dalberg was born in 1538, the son of Friedrich Kämmerer von Worms alias von Dalberg (1500–1574), and his wife Anna von Fleckenstein (d. 1564).

When the cathedral chapter of Mainz Cathedral met on 19–20 April 1582 to elect a new Archbishop of Mainz, Dalberg narrowly beat out Julius Echter von Mespelbrunn, Bishop of Würzburg to become the new archbishop. Pope Gregory XIII confirmed his election on 3 September 1582. He was ordained as a priest in 1583.

In 1583, Dalberg signed a treaty with William IV, Landgrave of Hesse-Kassel, settling a long-standing border dispute between the Archbishopric of Mainz and Hesse-Kassel. In that treaty, the archbishopric gave up its claims in Hesse, and Hesse-Kassel gave up its claim on Eichsfeld.

Dalberg oversaw introduction of the Gregorian calendar in 1583.

Dalberg was ordained as a bishop by Georg von Schönenberg, Bishop of Worms on 20 May 1584. Although a firm Roman Catholic, Dalberg strove for reconciliation with the Protestants. In the spirit of the Counter-Reformation, he performed a canonical visitation in his archdiocese.

Dalberg died in Aschaffenburg on 5 April 1601 and is buried in Mainz Cathedral.

Catholic Church titles
Preceded by Daniel Brendel of Homburg	Archbishop of Mainz; 1582 – 1601	Succeeded by Johann Adam von Bicken
