= Daniel Brendel von Homburg =

- Archbishop of Mainz
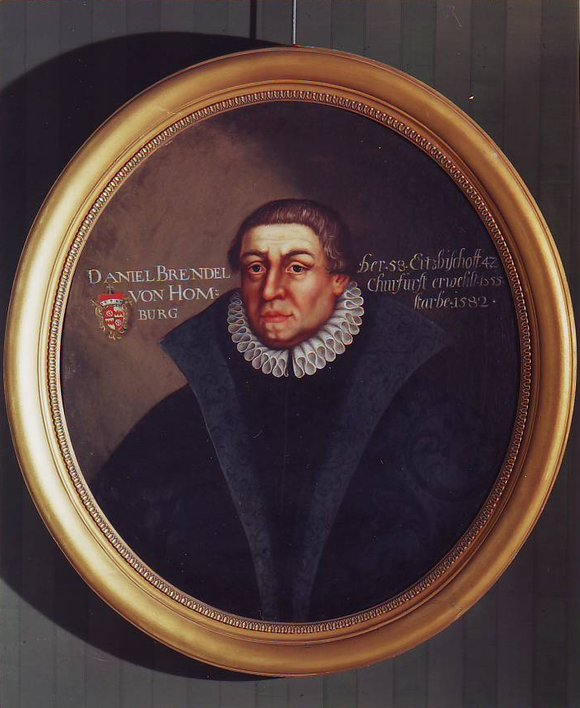
- Daniel Brendel of Homburg
- Church: Catholic Church
- Diocese: Electorate of Mainz
- In office: 1555–1582

Personal details
- Born: 22 March 1522
- Died: 22 March 1582 (aged 60)

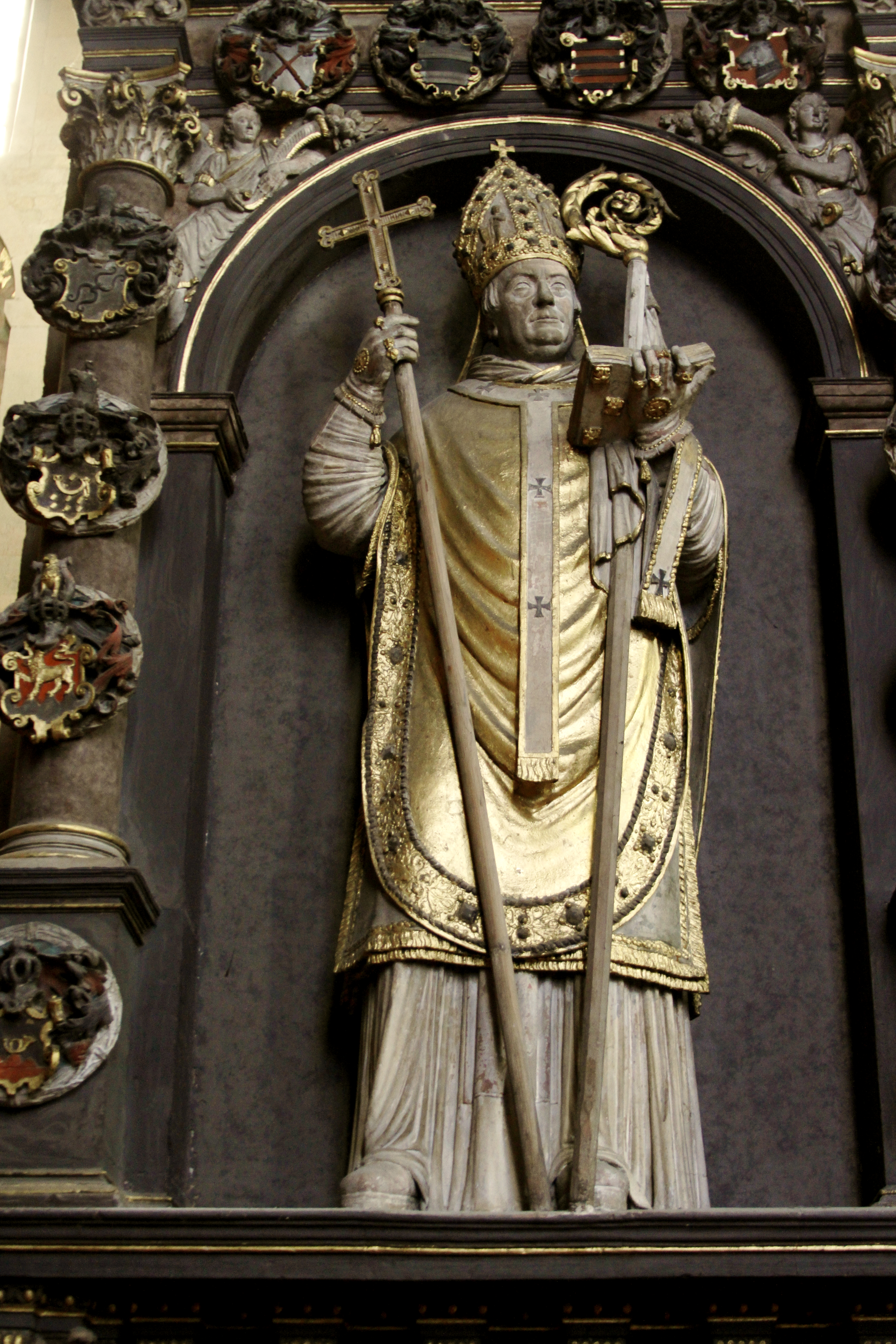
Epitaph in Mainz Cathedral.

Daniel Brendel of Homburg (German: Daniel Brendel von Homburg) (22 March 1522 – 22 March 1582) was the Archbishop-Elector of Mainz from 1555 to 1582.

== Biography ==
Daniel Brendel of Homburg was born in Aschaffenburg on March 22, 1522.

The cathedral chapter of Mainz Cathedral elected Daniel to be Archbishop of Mainz on April 18, 1555; he beat the Lutheran Pfalzgraf Reichart von Simmern by only one vote. Pope Paul IV confirmed his election on August 23, 1555, and he was ordained by Rudolf von und zu Frankenstein, Bishop of Speyer, in June 1557.

Daniel Brendel founded a college for the training of Jesuits at the University of Mainz in 1561.

Daniel Brendel took place in the Frankfurt election of 1558, which recognized the abdication of Charles V, Holy Roman Emperor and confirmed that his successor was Ferdinand I, Holy Roman Emperor. During the Imperial election of 1562, Daniel Brendel voted for Maximilian, King of the Romans, later crowning Maximilian Holy Roman Emperor in Frankfurt in 1564. During the imperial election held in Regensburg on October 27, 1575, Daniel Brendel voted for Rudolf, King of the Romans, whom Daniel Brendel later crowned Holy Roman Emperor in Regensburg in 1576.

Daniel Brendel expanded the size of the Archbishopric of Mainz by acquiring Rieneck (1559), Eppstein, and Königstein im Taunus (1581).

Daniel Brendel's head cook, Marx Rumpolt, published the famous cookbook Ein new Kochbuch in 1581.

Daniel Brendel died in Aschaffenburg on March 22, 1582.

Catholic Church titles
Preceded by Sebastian of Heusenstamm	Archbishop of Mainz; 1555 – 1582	Succeeded by Wolfgang von Dalberg
