= Sant'Erasmo (disambiguation) =

Sant'Erasmo may refer to:

- Sant'Erasmo, an island in the Venetian Lagoon lying north-east of the Lido island and east of Venice, Italy.
- Sant'Erasmo, Bassiano, a Roman Catholic church located in Bassiano, province of Latina, region of Lazio, central Italy.
- Sant'Erasmo, Veroli, a Romanesque architecture, Roman Catholic church and convent located in Veroli, province of Frosinone, region of Lazio, central Italy.

== See also ==
- Saint Erasmus
- Erasmo
