= Erasmo =

Erasmo is a given name. Notable people with the name include:

- Claudio Erasmo Vargas (born 1974), Mexican race walker
- Erasmo Carlos (1941–2022), Brazilian singer and songwriter
- Erasmo Catarino (born 1977), Mexican singer, winner on the TV show La Academia 4
- Erasmo de Sequeira (died 1997), politician, social worker and parliamentarian from Goa, India
- Erasmo Escala (1826–1884), Chilean soldier, commander-in-chief of the Army during part of the War of the Pacific
- Erasmo Fuentes (born 1943), Mexican-born sculptor who lives in Utah
- Erasmo of Narni (1370–1443), one of the condottieri or mercenaries in the Italian Renaissance
- Erasmo Oneglia (1853–1934), Italian printer and stamp forger
- Erasmo Ramirez (left-handed pitcher) (born 1976), Major League Baseball left-handed relief pitcher
- Erasmo Ramírez (right-handed pitcher) (born 1990), Major League Baseball pitcher
- Erasmo Salemme (born 1946), Italian volleyball player and coach
- Erasmo Seguín (1782–1857), prominent citizen and politician in San Antonio de Bexar, Spanish Texas
- Erasmo Solórzano (born 1985), Mexican soccer player
- Stacey D'Erasmo (born 1961), American novelist and literary critic

== See also ==
- Sant'Erasmo (disambiguation), disambiguation page
- Stadio Erasmo Iacovone, multi-use stadium in Taranto, Italy
- Erasmus, Dutch Renaissance humanist
