= Albrecht of Brandenburg =

Albrecht of Brandenburg may refer to:

- Albert of Mainz (1490–1545), Elector and Archbishop of Mainz (1514–1545) and of Magdeburg (1513–1545)
- Albert of Prussia (1490–1568), Grand Master of the Teutonic Knights
