= Bassiano =

Bassiano Vassiano
- Comune
- Comune di Bassiano
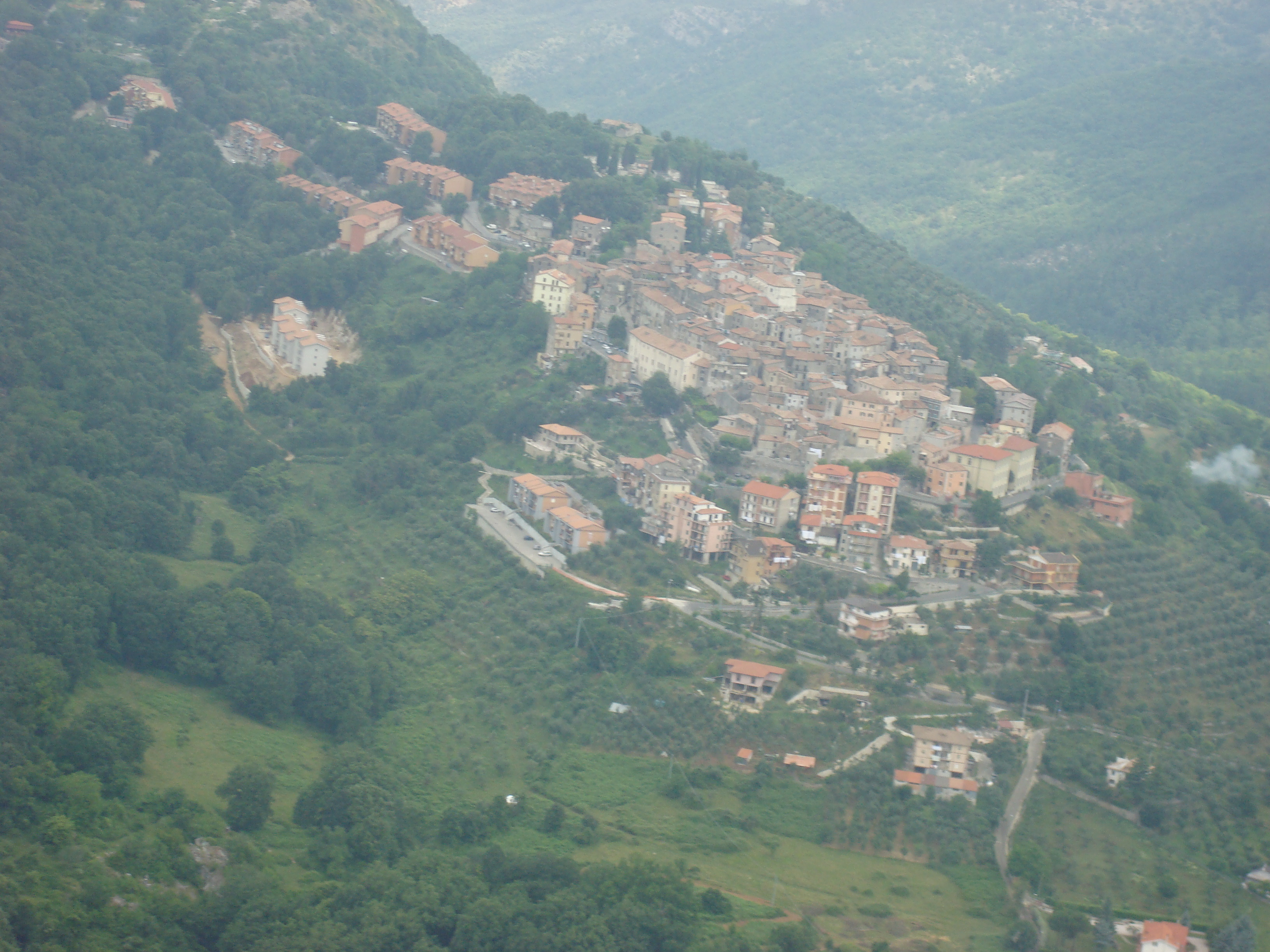
- View of Bassiano

- Location within Italy Location within Lazio
- Coordinates: 41°33′N 13°2′E
- Country: Italy
- Region: Lazio
- Province: Province of Latina (LT)

Government
  - Mayor: Domenico Guidi (Civic list)

Area
  - Total: 31.6 km^{2} (12.2 sq mi)
- Elevation: 562 m (1,844 ft)

Population (December 2004)
  - Total: 1,664
  - Density: 52.7/km^{2} (136/sq mi)
- Demonym: Bassianesi
- Time zone: UTC+1 (CET)
  - Summer (DST): UTC+2 (CEST)
- Postal code: 04010
- Dialing code: 0773
- Patron saint: Erasmus of Formia
- Website: Official website

Bassiano (locally Vassiano) is a municipality (comune) in the Province of Latina in the Italian region of Lazio, located about 60 kilometres (37 mi) southeast of Rome and about 14 kilometres (9 mi) northeast of Latina. As of 31 December 2004, it had a population of 1,664 and an area of 31.6 square kilometres (12.2 mi^{2}).

Its patron saint is Erasmus of Formia, and its church is named after him. It is the birthplace of Renaissance humanist and printer Aldus Manutius.

Bassiano borders the municipalities of Carpineto Romano, Norma, Sermoneta, Sezze.

== Demographic evolution ==
Historical population

Year	Pop.	±%
1861	?	—
1871	1,783	—
1881	1,799	+0.9%
1901	2,258	+25.5%
1911	2,420	+7.2%

Year	Pop.	±%
1921	2,451	+1.3%
1931	2,801	+14.3%
1936	2,211	−21.1%
1951	2,141	−3.2%
1961	1,874	−12.5%

Year	Pop.	±%
1971	1,595	−14.9%
1981	1,535	−3.8%
1991	1,635	+6.5%
2001	1,617	−1.1%

Source: Data from ISTAT

== Churches ==
- San Nicola
