= Sebastian von Heusenstamm =

The Most Reverend Sebastian of Heusenstamm
- Archbishop-Elector of Mainz
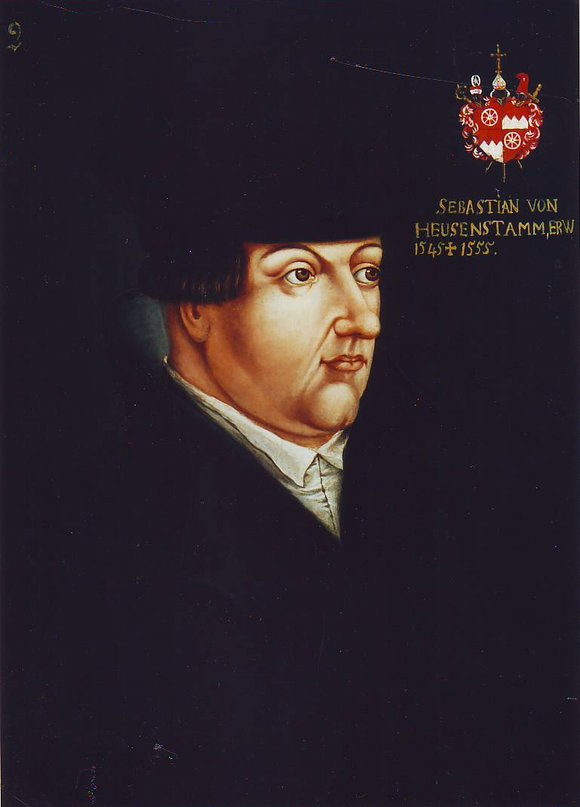
- Church: Roman Catholic
- Archdiocese: Electorate of Mainz
- In office: 1545–1555
- Predecessor: Albert of Mainz
- Successor: Daniel Brendel von Homburg

Orders
- Ordination: 6 October 1531
- Consecration: 2 May 1546 by Melchior Zobel von Giebelstadt

Personal details
- Born: 16 March 1508 Frankfurt
- Died: 18 March 1555 (aged 47) Eltville
- Buried: Mainz Cathedral

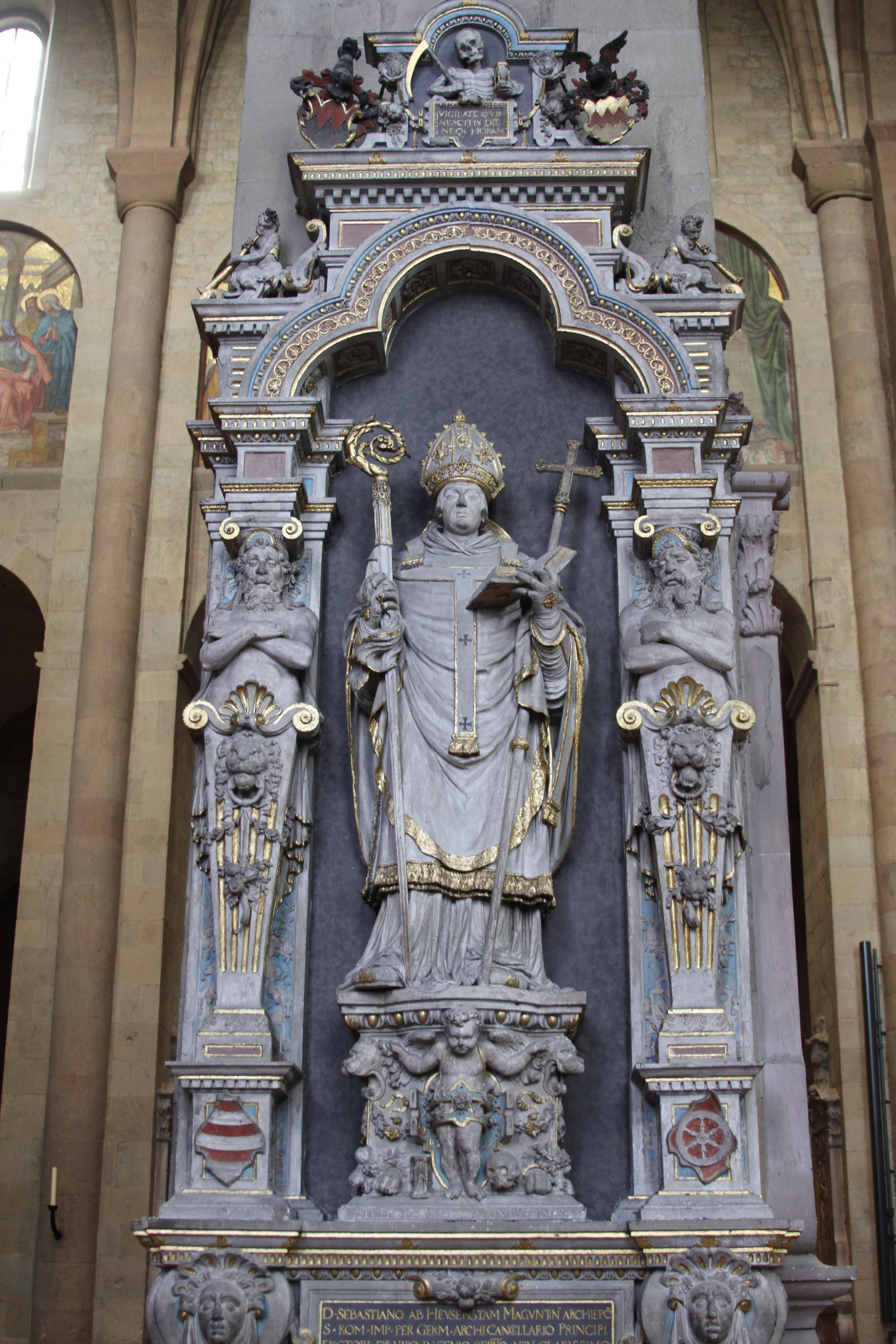
Memorial to Sebastian in Mainz Cathedral.

Sebastian of Heusenstamm (German: Sebastian von Heusenstamm) (16 March 1508 – 18 March 1555) was the Archbishop-Elector of Mainz from 1545 to 1555.

== Biography ==
Sebastian of Heusenstamm was born in Frankfurt on March 16, 1508. He was ordained as a priest in Mainz on October 6, 1531.

Following the death of Albert of Mainz, the cathedral chapter of Mainz Cathedral elected Sebastian to be the new Archbishop of Mainz on October 20, 1545. Pope Paul III confirmed his appointment on January 27, 1546, and he was consecrated as a bishop by Melchior Zobel von Giebelstadt, Bishop of Würzburg, on May 2, 1546.

The practice of canonical visitation had been re-established by the Council of Trent, so Sebastian conducted a visitation of the Archbishopric of Mainz, aimed at rooting out Protestant tendencies in the archbishopric. This visitation was largely carried out by Sebastian's auxiliary bishop, Michael Helding (later Bishop of Merseburg). Sebastian held a provincial synod on November 19, 1548 to launch the Counter-Reformation in Mainz. In 1551, along with John of Isenburg-Grenzau, Archbishop of Trier, he attended the Council of Trent, but the archbishops rushed home with the outbreak of the Second Margrave War in 1552.

During the Second Margrave War, troops of Albert Alcibiades, Margrave of Brandenburg-Kulmbach attacked Mainz in 1552, devastating the city. This convinced Sebastian that Charles V, Holy Roman Empire was unable to protect the ecclesiastical territories from the secular states surrounding them. He thus became a supporter of the principle of cuius regio, eius religio, although he died before the Peace of Augsburg was signed.

Sebastian died in Eltville on March 18, 1555. He is buried in Mainz Cathedral.

Catholic Church titles
Preceded by Albert of Mainz	Archbishop of Mainz; 1545 – 1555	Succeeded by Daniel Brendel von Homburg
