= Saint Erasmus and Saint Maurice =

Painting by Mathias Grünewald

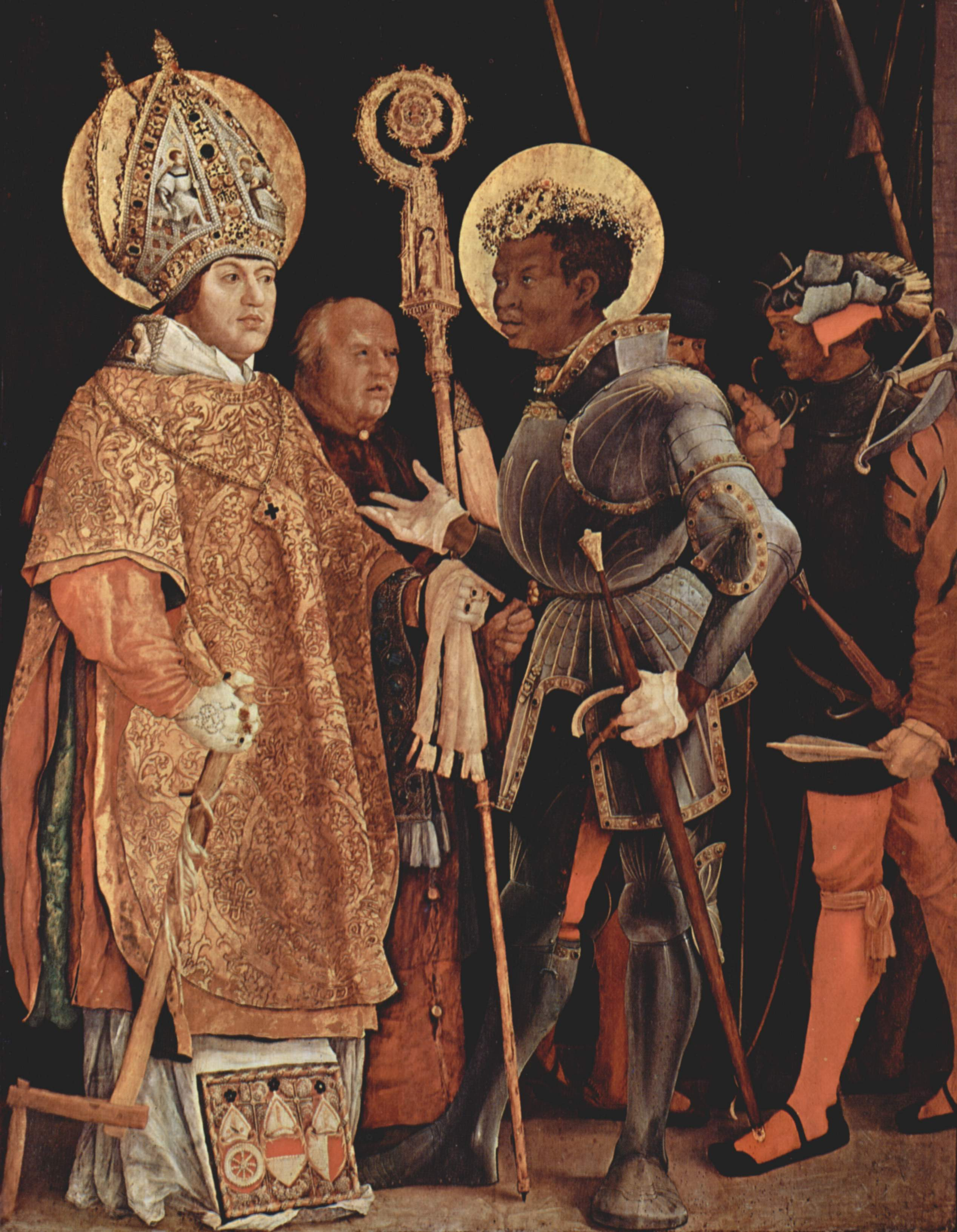
- Artist: Matthias Grünewald
- Year: c. 1520-1524
- Type: Oil on wood
- Dimensions: 226 cm × 176 cm (89 in × 69 in)
- Location: Alte Pinakothek, Munich

Saint Erasmus and Saint Maurice is an oil on wood painting by German artist Matthias Grünewald. It was commissioned by Albert of Brandenburg, executed between 1520 and 1524, and originally intended for the new cathedral in Halle. It is now held at the Alte Pinakothek in Munich.

== Description ==
Saint Erasmus stands dressed in luxurious episcopal vestments, on the left. He holds in his right hand the testimony of his martyrdom, the spindle wrapped in entrails torn from his body with a ship's winch. Opposite him stands Saint Maurice, in a silver armour. He addresses Saint Erasmus by raising his hand clad in a white glove. Maurice, according to the legend, was the leader of the "Thebes Legion", in which only Christian soldiers served. This legion was stationed at Thebes in Egypt and was slain because of their refusal to take part in the persecution of Christians during the reign of Diocletian. Behind St. Erasmus there is a gray-haired abbot, a scholar and an adviser to the archbishop. Behind St. Maurice, there are its hardened soldiers. The poses, movements, clothing, facial expressions and colors of the four figures depicted in the painting brilliantly characterize the various strata of the medieval society. A leader of the clergy in Europe meets a leader of the soldiers in Africa. This, one might say, represents a church-political meeting on the world stage, a testimony of the power and splendor of Catholicism on two continents.

== Patron ==
The image of Saint Erasmus actually depicts the commissioner of this painting, known from numerous portraits of that time, Albert of Brandenburg, who was in 1514 the archbishop of Mainz and Magdeburg, and the bishop of Halberstadt. In 1518 he was made a cardinal by Pope Leo X, and later would be chancellor of the Holy Roman Empire, during which tenure he was a fanatical and powerful opponent of the Protestant Reformation. This painting is part of the collection of the Alte Pinakothek in Munich, since his opening in 1836.
