= San Nicola, Bassiano =

Building in Bassiano, Italy

San Nicola is a Roman Catholic church located on Via del Plebiscito in Bassiano, a town in the province of Latina in central Italy.

== History ==
The church was originally dedicated to the Apostle St Peter, and was built by the year 1200, but heavily damaged during World War II. It has undergone marked restoration, including of frescoes relating to the plagues and Herod and Salome.

The church has two naves, and has a Latin cross layout. It contains a canvas painting depicting the Holy Savior by Girolamo Siciolante da Sermoneta.
