= Marktbrunnen (Mainz) =

Coordinates: 49°59′58″N 8°16′27″E

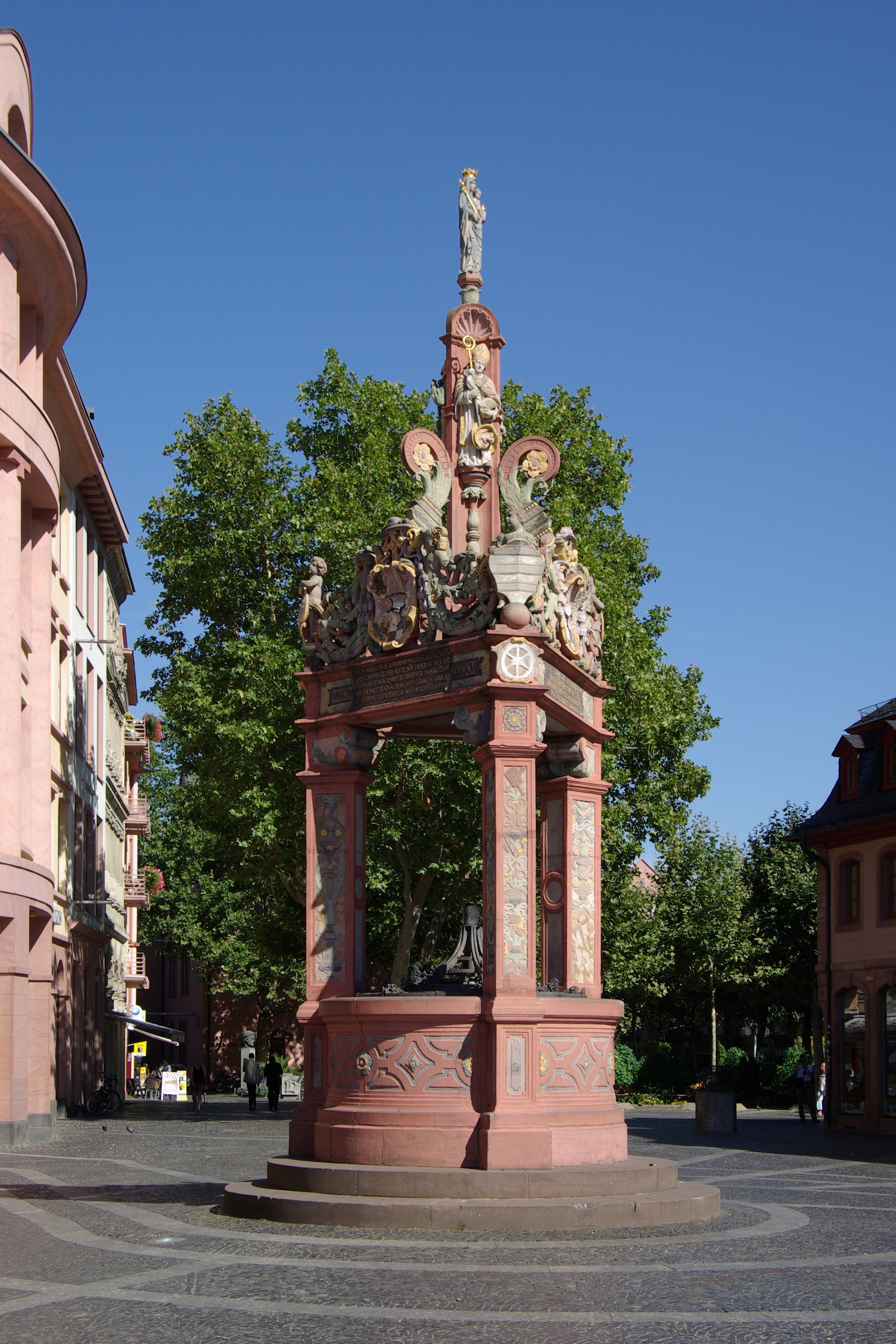
Marktbrunnen in Mainz

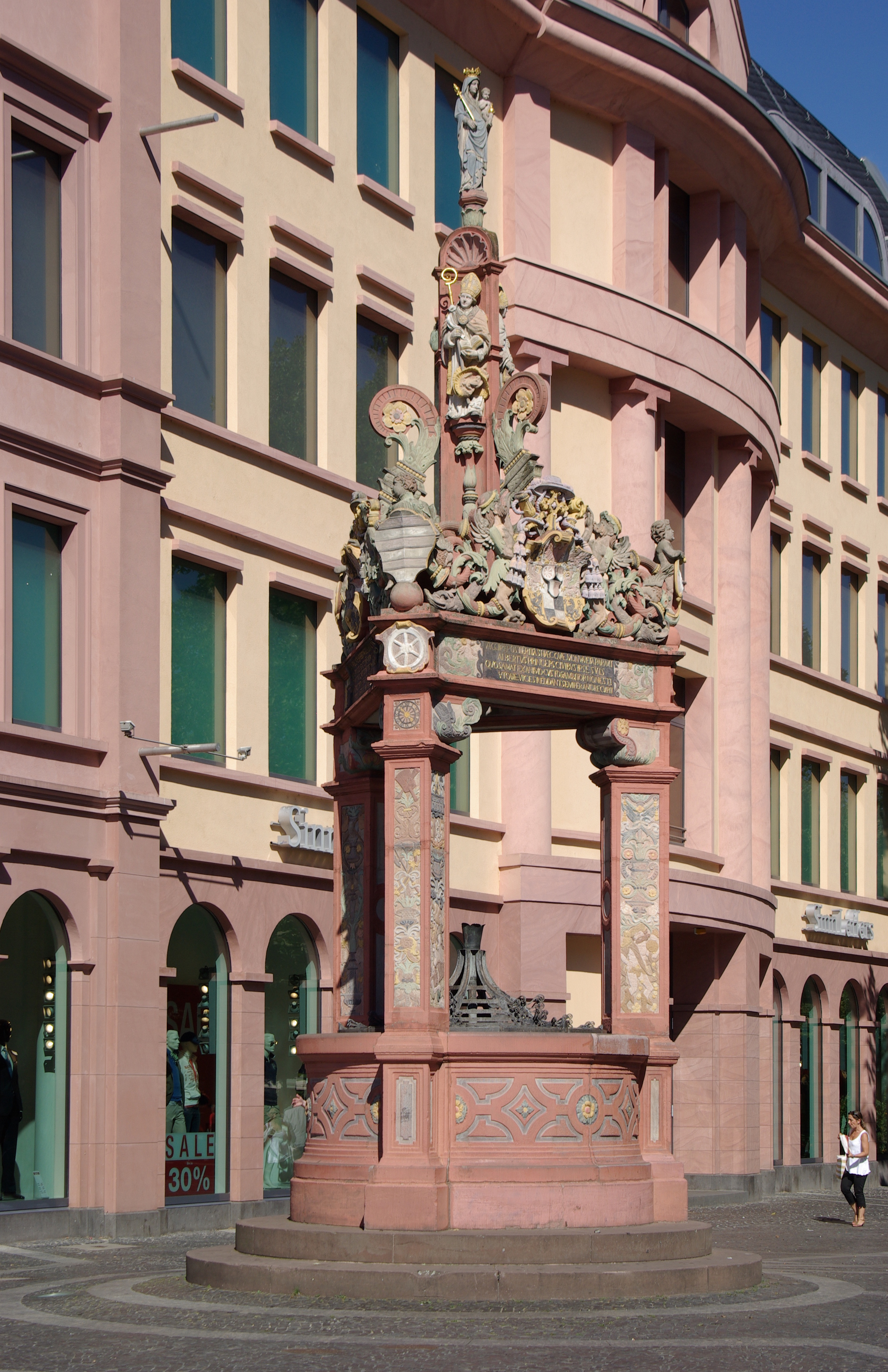
Marktbrunnen in Mainz

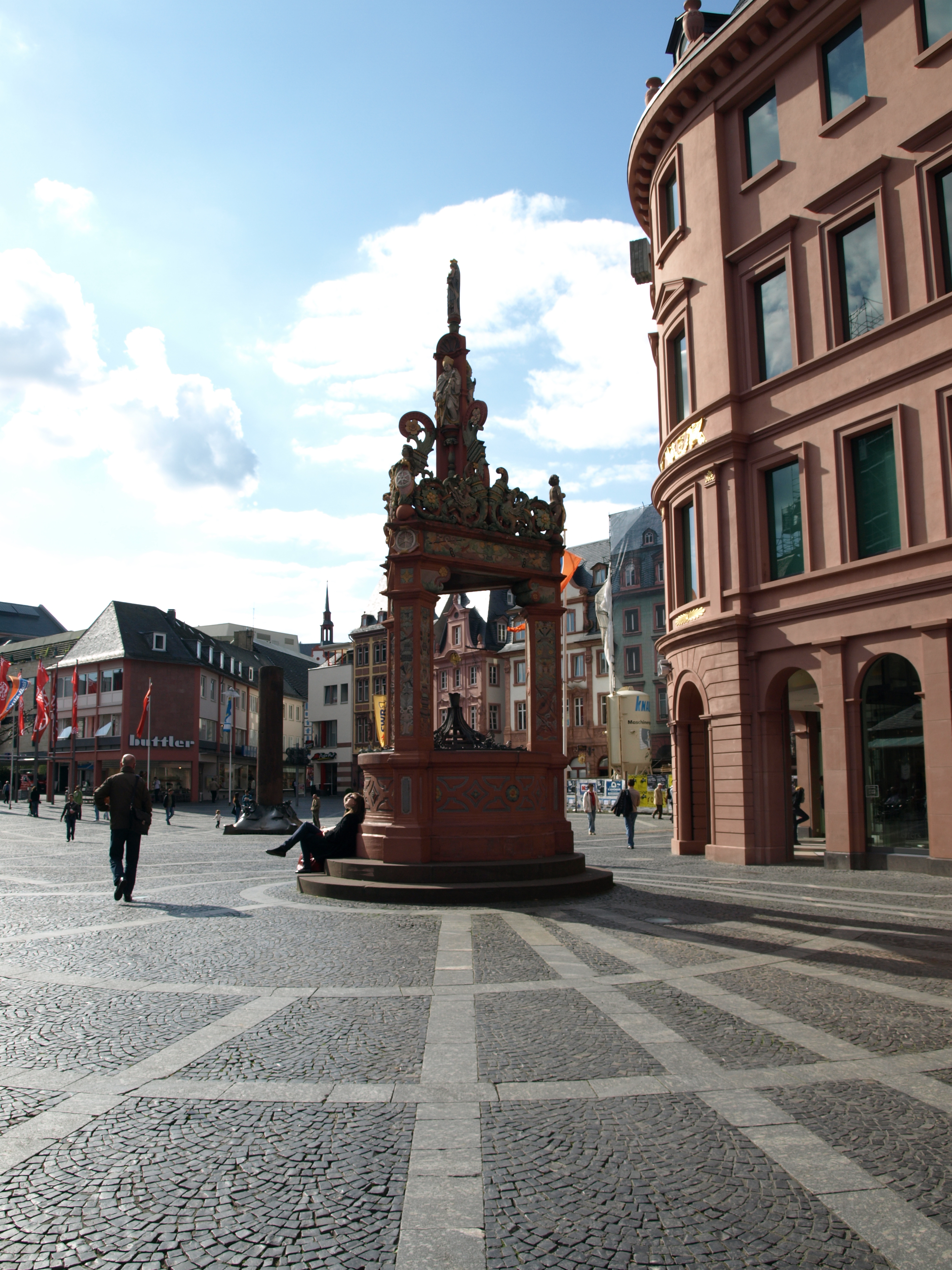
Marktbrunnen in Mainz

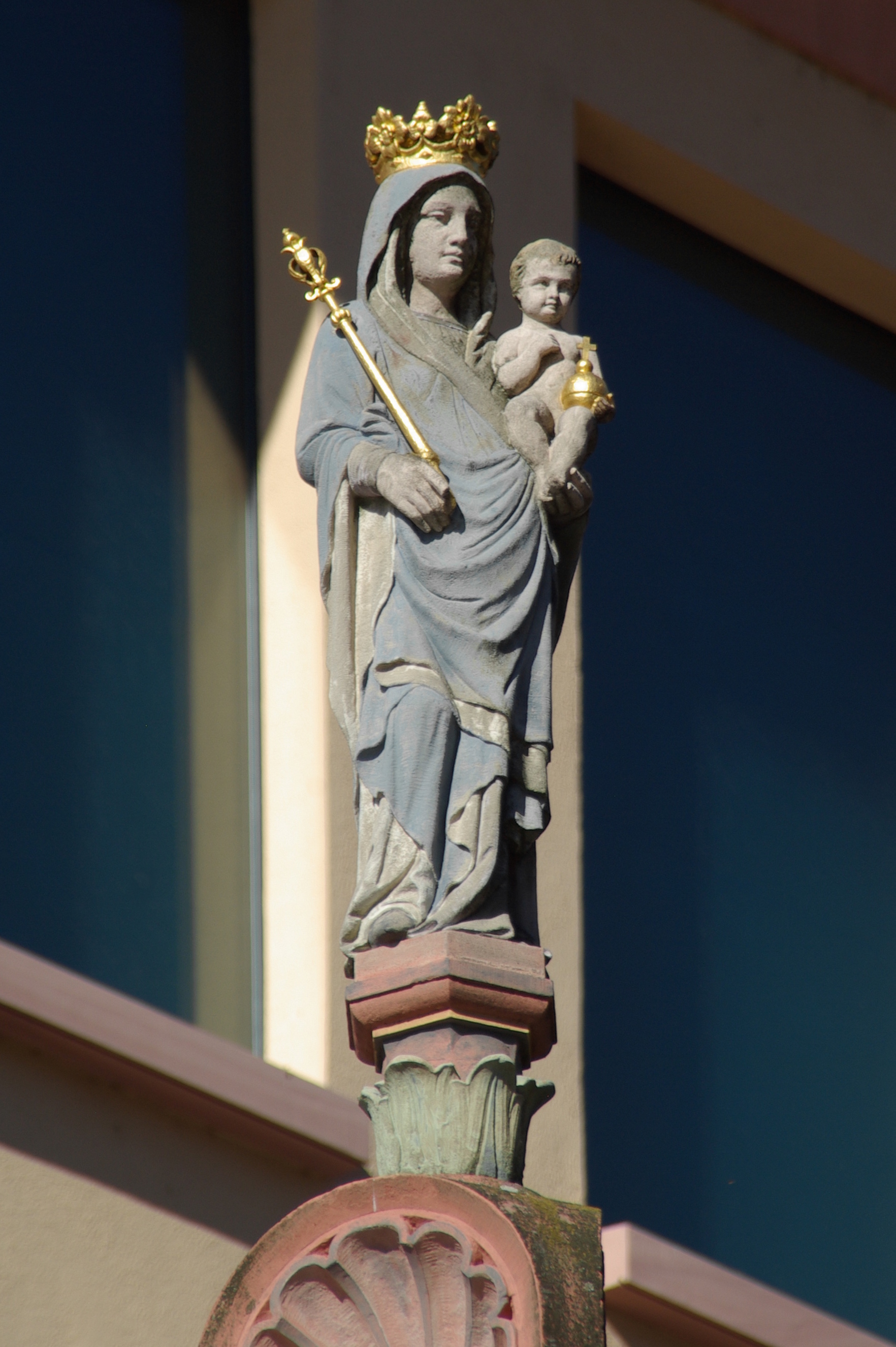
Madonna topping the Marktbrunnen

The Marktbrunnen in Mainz is a renaissance fountain located at the ″Markt″ (market place) of Mainz. It was donated by elector Albert of Mainz and crafted in the workshop of the Mainz sculptor Hans Backoffen. The Marktbrunnen represents one of the first architectural formed decorated fountains of the renaissance.

== History ==
Motivation for the donation of the fountain to the community of Mainz had been two events. On one hand, the donator prince-elector and cardinal Albert celebrated the lucky end of the German Peasants' War in his electoral residence. In April 1525 there had occurred unrests and an adoption of 31 articles of the insurgent population. The municipal administration and the cathedral chapter had to agree to these articles in the absence of the elector. Following the military defeat of the Peasants' War, the Mainzer subjugated by 1 July 1525 without further action again their rulers. With the inscription on the representative market fountain Albert honored Emperor Charles V and his victory at the Battle of Pavia on Francis I of France, whose capture is also mentioned.

The fountain that Albert of Mainz donated emphatically to the population of Mainz was first conceived as a draw-well. It became an important source of fresh water in the inner city and in 1767 they altered it to a pumping well. In 1889 the market fountain was first transferred to the northeast side of the square and later supplemented with a Madonna figure at the top end. During World War II, the market well was walled and survived the bombing of Mainz, with no major damage. As part of the redesign of the surroundings of the cathedral and the establishment of a large, interconnected pedestrian zone during 1975, the fountain was relocated to its original place near the cathedral houses.

== Architecture ==
Thestructure of this fountain is a three column fountain built of red sandstone. The round fountain vat, comprising two shallow steps is divided by the three pedestals of shallow relief pillars. These carry a triangular shaped circulating frames on which there is also the donor's inscription. Above the entablature is a figurative and ornate openwork crown from light sandstone. The completion of the fountain is a pillar baldachin. This was originally called the "market standard" with the arms of the sovereign, who acted as a protective and court Lord of the market. Today there is a subsequently sat Madonna. This was created in 1890 by the Mainz sculptor Valentin Barth and placed after the first dislocation of Marktbunnens.

Presumably, the fountain was created by the sculptor Peter Schro, a student of the late Hans Backoffen 1519. Backoffen has created, among many other works in the Renaissance style, the grave monument of Albert of Brandenburg located still today in Mainz cathedral.

== Iconography ==
The iconography o the market fountain reflects the glorification of the city ruler and the victory of the God-given order against the rebels. For example, the picture of a drunken peasant with a red rooster is headed with the words O BEDENK DAS END (literally: Oh consider the end). Allegorical symbols such as the skull or the hourglass also remind the viewer. There are also a variety of other symbols such as justice symbols that stood for the politics of the sovereign, floral ornaments and arabesques.

On the top of the fountain mythical creatures keep the coat of arms of the donator: two personal arms of Albrecht of Brandenburg House of Hohenzollern and Brandenburg emblems and coats of arms with the emblems of his three (arch) dioceses Halberstadt, Magdeburg and Mainz. Also shown is the cardinal's hat, that Albrecht had received in 1518. In the niches of the pillars of the city's the two patrons St. Martin of Tours and Saint Boniface as well as St. Ulrich of Augsburg available as a source patron.

== Donator's inscription ==
The donor's inscription is in the crossbar of the triangular entablature. It is, despite the dedication of the fountain for illiterate people, written in Latin.
ACCIPE POSTERITAS HAEC QVAE MONUMENTA PARAVIT
ALBERTVS PRINCEPS CIVIBUS IPSE SUIS
QVOS AMAT EX ANIMO CUSTOS AMBITOR HONESTI (honestus?) CVPIT)
VTQVAE VICES REDDANT SEMPER AMORE CVPIT
DIVO KAROLO V CAESARE SEMP(ER): AVGUST(US) POST VICTORIA(M)
GALLICAM REGE IPSO AD TICINV(M) SVPERATO(R) AC CAPTO
TRIVMPHANTE: FATALIQ(ve?) RVSTICOR (S)VPER GERMANIA CONSPIRATIONE
PROSTRATA ALBER(T) CARD(INAL) ET ARCHIEP:(ISCOPUS) MOG(VNTIAE)
FONTE(M) HUNC VETVSTATE DILAPSV(S) AD CIVI(B)US V(S)ORUM
POSTERITASQVE VSUM RESTITVI CVRAVIT
