= Albert of Brandenburg =

Catholic cardinal (1490–1545)

His Eminence Albert von Brandenburg
- Archbishop of Mainz
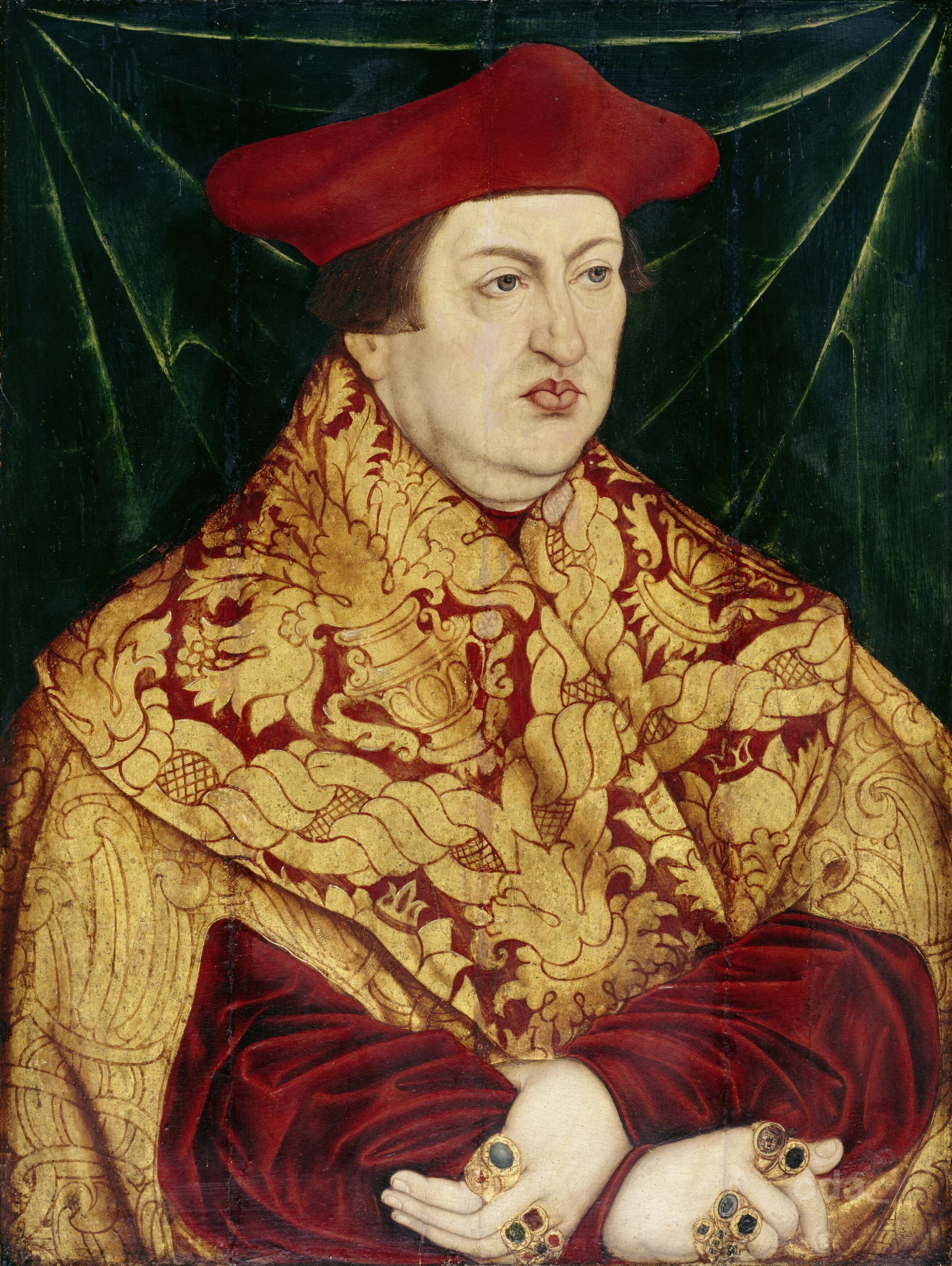
- Portrait by Lucas Cranach the Elder, 1526
- Church: Catholic
- Archdiocese: Electorate of Mainz
- In office: 1514–1545
- Predecessor: Uriel von Gemmingen
- Successor: Sebastian von Heusenstamm

Orders
- Ordination: 4 April 1513
- Consecration: 2 July 1514 by Dietrich von Bülow
- Created cardinal: 24 March 1518 by Leo X

Personal details
- Born: 28 June 1490 Kölln
- Died: 24 September 1545 (aged 55) Martinsburg, Mainz
- Buried: Mainz Cathedral

Albert von Brandenburg (German: Albrecht von Brandenburg; 28 June 1490 – 24 September 1545) was a German cardinal, elector, Archbishop of Mainz from 1514 to 1545, and Archbishop of Magdeburg from 1513 to 1545.

Through his notorious sale of indulgences, he became the catalyst for Martin Luther's Reformation and its staunch opponent.

== Early life ==
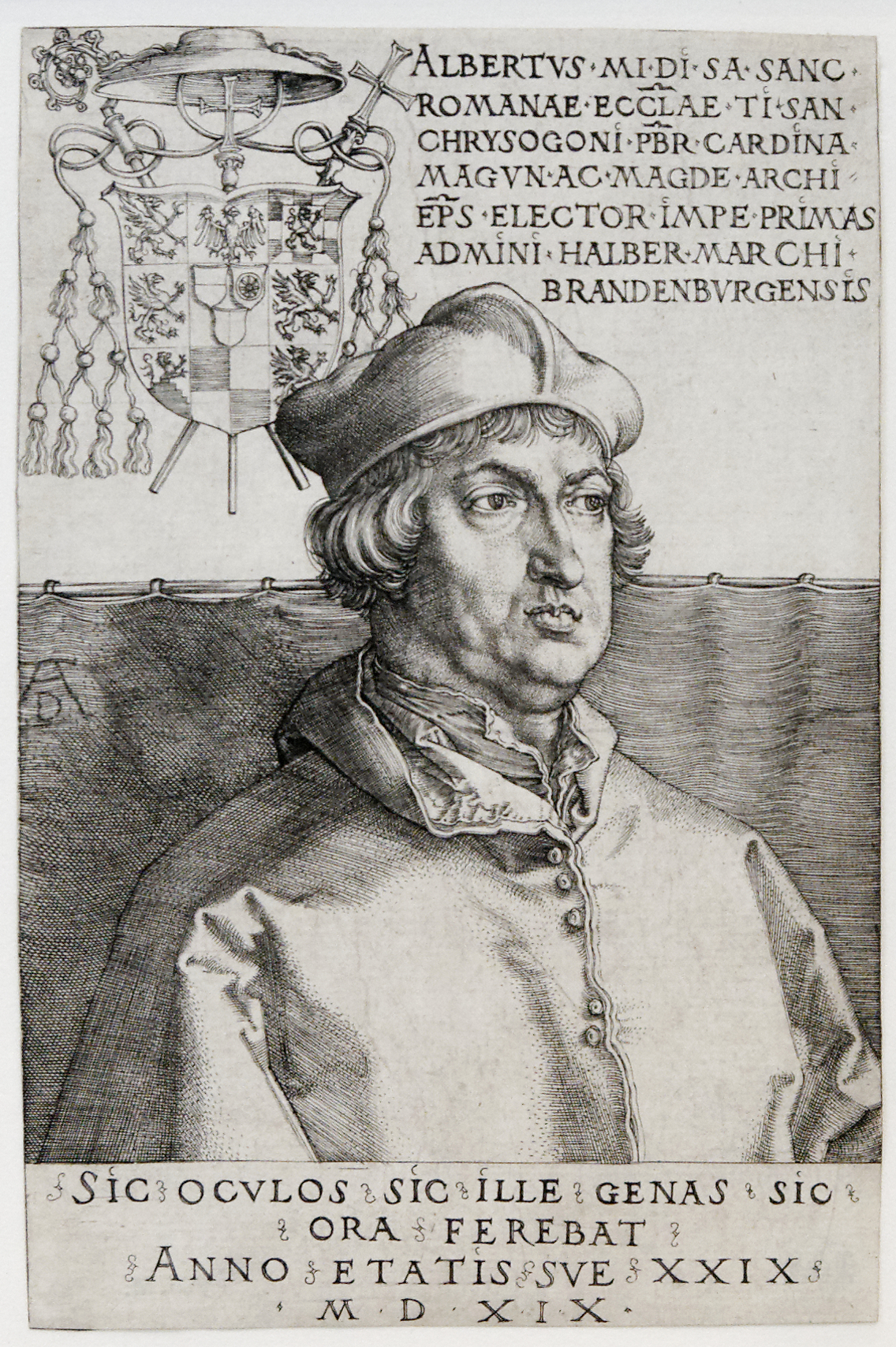
Cardinal Albert, Archbishop of Magdeburg and Mainz, by Albrecht Dürer

Born in Cölln on the Spree, now a central part of Berlin, into the ruling House of Hohenzollern, Albert was the younger son of John Cicero, Elector of Brandenburg and Margaret of Thuringia.

After their father died in 1499, Albert's older brother Joachim I Nestor became elector of Brandenburg while Albert held only the title of a margrave of Brandenburg. Albert studied at the University of Frankfurt (Oder).

== Career ==
In 1513 became Archbishop of Magdeburg at the age of 23 and administrator of the Diocese of Halberstadt.

In 1514, he was also elected Archbishop of Mainz and thus sovereign of the Electorate of Mainz and archchancellor of the Holy Roman Empire. By electing him, the Mainz cathedral chapter hoped for the support of the Elector of Brandenburg in defending the city of Erfurt, which belonged to the archbishopric of Mainz, against the expansionist efforts of the neighboring Saxon dukes. However, this choice violated the canonical prohibition to hold more than one bishopric. Albert also did not meet the requirements for taking over any diocese, since he had not yet reached the age, and he didn't have a college degree; therefore, he received a study dispensation in 1513. Albert borrowed 20,000 guilders from Jacob Fugger to pay the confirmation fee to the Roman Curia (see: simony). In 1514 Albert suggested to Pope Leo X that a special indulgence be announced in his three dioceses as well as in his native diocese of Brandenburg and that half of the income should be used for the construction of the new St. Peter's Basilica and half for Albert's own cash register. The papal bull was issued on 31 March 1515. The indulgence was entrusted to Albert in 1517 for publication in Saxony and Brandenburg. It cost him the considerable sum of ten thousand ducats, and Albert employed Johann Tetzel for the actual preaching of the indulgence. Later, Martin Luther addressed a letter of protest to Albert concerning the conduct of Tetzel.

Largely in reaction to Tetzel's actions, Luther wrote his famous Ninety-five Theses, which led to the Reformation. Luther sent these to Albert on 31 October 1517, and according to a disputable tradition, nailed a copy to the door of Castle Church in Wittenberg. Albert forwarded the theses to Rome, suspecting Luther of heresy.

As Archbishop of Mainz, he tried unsuccessfully in 1515 and 1516 to expel the Jews living in Mainz. In 1518, at the age of 28, he was made a cardinal. When the imperial election of 1519 drew near, partisans of the two leading candidates (kings Charles I of Spain and Francis I of France) eagerly solicited the vote of the Prince-Archbishop of Mainz, and Albert appears to have received a large amount of money for his vote. The electors eventually chose Charles, who became the Emperor Charles V.

Like other high-ranking clergymen of his time, Archbishop Albert lived in concubinage, gave his lovers gifts, and favored his children as far as possible without causing much offense. Recent research assumes that he lived in a marriage-like relationship at first with Elisabeth "Leys" Schütz from Mainz and then with the Frankfurt widow Agnes Pless, née Strauss. With Leys Schütz, he had a daughter named Anna, whom he married to his secretary Joachim Kirchner.

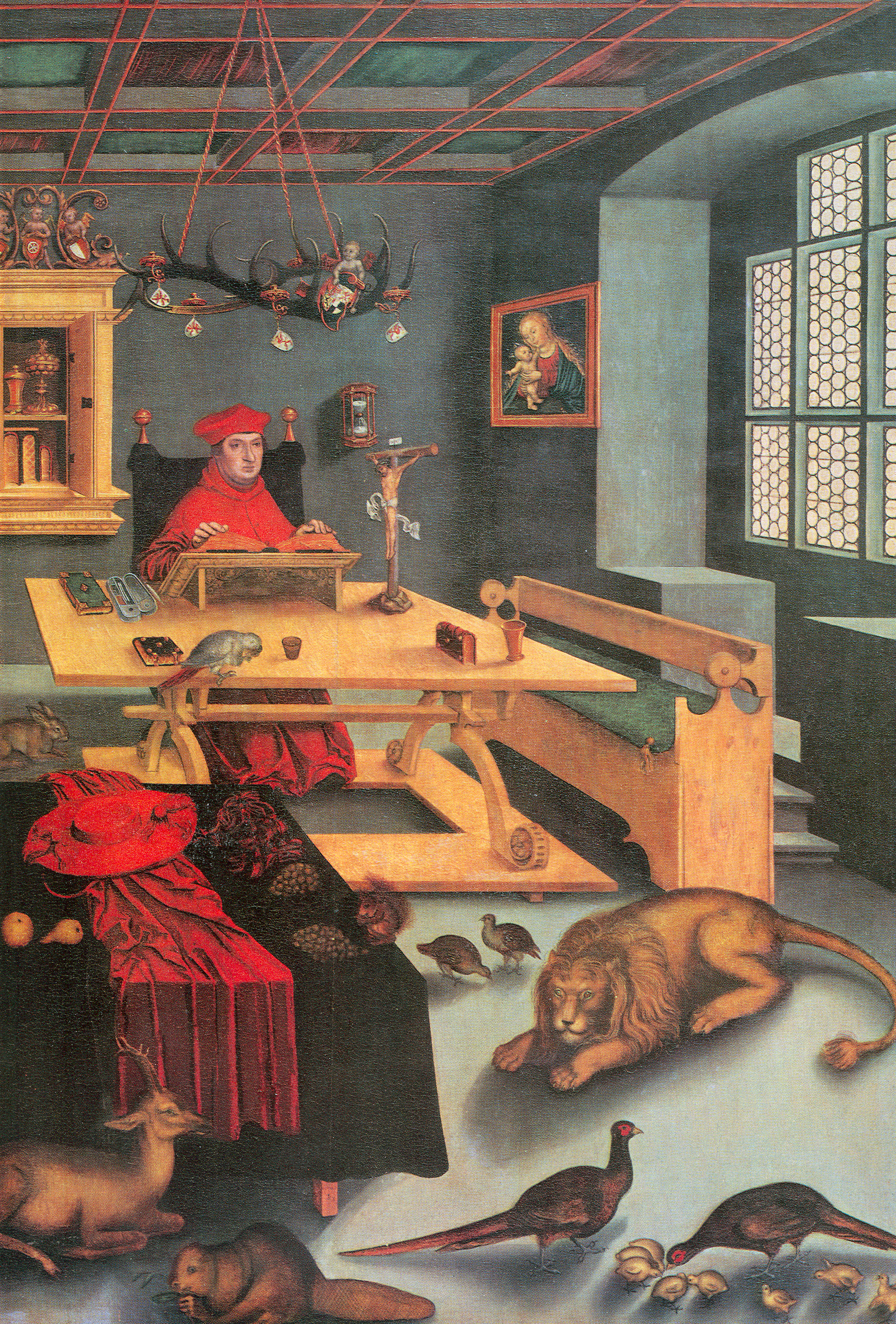
Cardinal Albert, Archbishop of Mainz, as Saint Jerome while studying, by Lucas Cranach the Elder, 1526

Albert's large and liberal ideas, his correspondence with leading humanists, his friendship with Ulrich von Hutten whom he drew to his court, and his political ambitions, appear to have raised hopes that he could be won over to Protestantism; but after the German Peasants' War of 1525 he ranged himself definitely among the supporters of Catholicism, and was among the princes who joined the League of Dessau in July 1525.

From 1514 until his flight on 21 February 1541, Albert ruled mostly from his residence Moritzburg in Halle. In 1531, he had a spacious new residential palace built there. Albert also needed a prestigious church that met his expectations at a central location in his residenz town. He feared for his peace of mind in heaven, and collected more than 8,100 relics and 42 holy skeletons, which needed to be stored. From 1529, he had two parish churches standing next to each other demolished, and only their four towers from c. 1400 with pointed helmets stood. Between these towers, he had a large new nave built, which was named Market Church of Our Lady since she received a Marian patronage. However, these precious treasures, known as Hallesches Heilthum (the Halle sanctuary), were indirectly related to the sale of indulgences, which had triggered the Reformation a few years before, because it should attract pilgrims willing to pay. Then, the cardinal and the Catholic members of the town council wanted to repress the growing influence of the Reformation by holding far grander Masses and services in a new church dedicated solely to the Blessed Virgin Mary, whose excessive worship Luther disliked.

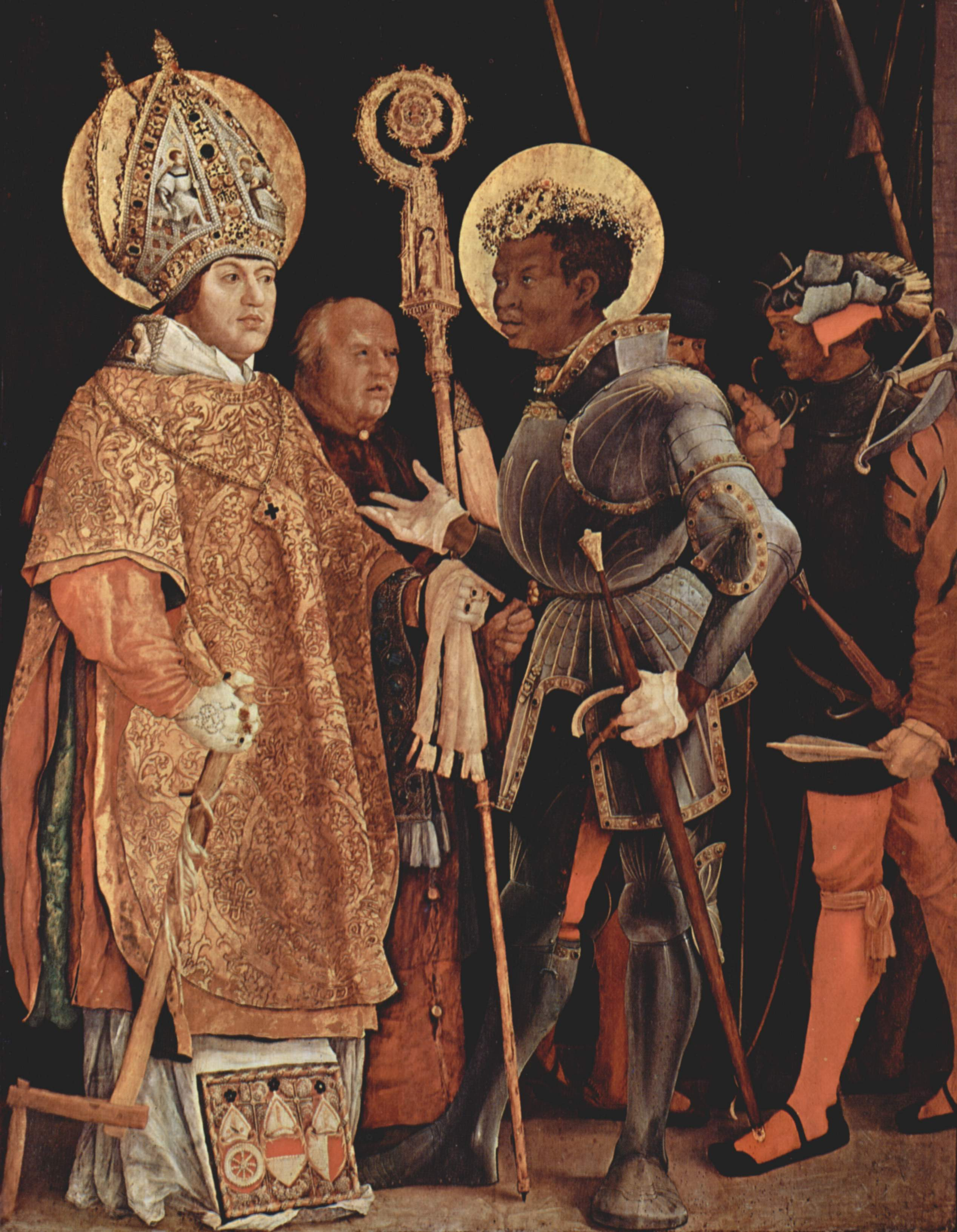
Meeting of Saint Erasmus of Formiae and Saint Maurice, by Matthias Grünewald, between 1517 and 1523. Grünewald used Albert of Mainz, who commissioned the painting, as the model for St. Erasmus (left).

Albert's hostility towards the reformers, however, was not so extreme as that of his brother Joachim I; and he appears to have exerted himself towards peace, although he was a member of the League of Nuremberg, formed in 1538 as a counterpoise to the League of Schmalkalden. New doctrines nevertheless made considerable progress in his dominions, and he was compelled to grant religious liberty to the inhabitants of Magdeburg in return for 500,000 florins. In his later years, he showed more intolerance towards the Protestants, and favoured the teaching of the Jesuits in his dominions.

The Market Church of Our Lady in Halle, which had been built to defend against the spread of Reformation sympathies, was the spot where Justus Jonas officially introduced the Reformation into Halle with his Good Friday sermon in 1541. The service must have been at least partly conducted in the open air, because at that time construction had only been finished at the eastern end of the nave. Jonas began a successful preaching crusade and attracted so many people that the church overflowed. Albert left the town permanently after the estates in the city had announced that they would take over his enormous debt at the bank of Jakob Fugger. Halle became Protestant, and in 1542 Jonas was appointed as priest to St. Mary's and, in 1544, bishop over the city.

=== Patron of the arts ===
He became a friend of science and a patron of the arts. As a patron of learning, he counted Erasmus among his friends. However, Albert's ideas about founding a Catholic university in Halle were not implemented. Nonetheless, he adorned Halle Cathedral and Mainz Cathedral in sumptuous fashion, and took as his motto the words Domine, dilexi decorem domus tuae (Latin for "I have loved, O Lord, the beauty of thy house", from Psalm 25:8). Matthias Grünewald and Lucas Cranach the Elder created magnificent paintings for the Halle Cathedral which was decorated from 1519 to 1525 with 16 Passion altars with 140 pictures by Cranach and his workshop, the largest single commission in German art history. Grünewald contributed the famous wood painting Saint Erasmus and Saint Maurice. Albert also ordered paintings from Hans Baldung Grien and a cycle of 18 life-size statues of saints from Peter Schro in Mainz, which can still be admired in Halle Cathedral today. In 1526 he donated the market fountain in Mainz. In 1521, Martin Luther referred to the ever-growing collection of relics as the "idol of Halle".

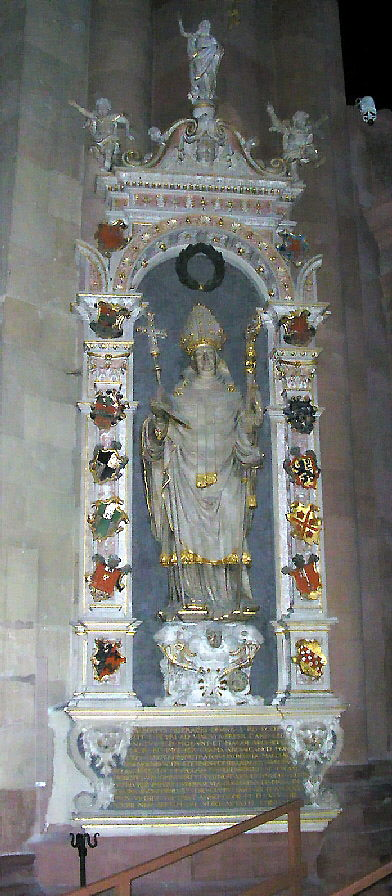
Albert's tomb in Mainz Cathedral

When Albert left Halle for good in 1541 and moved to his residence in Aschaffenburg in the electoral state of Mainz, he took with him the collection of relics, his private art collection, and a large part of the works of art he had donated to the cathedral and other Catholic churches that now became Protestant. He sold parts of the treasure of relics in order to be able to settle claims of the cathedral chapters of Magdeburg and Halberstadt; the sanctuaries are scattered today. He took his private paintings with him to his residence in Johannisburg Castle, where a large part was plundered and destroyed in 1552 during the Second Margrave War. He had the works of art brought from Halle Cathedral hung in the St. Peter und Alexander's church, where they survived all wars until the Elector-Archbishop Carl Theodor von Dalberg had them brought to Johannisburg Castle in 1803. There they were evacuated in good time before the damaging fire caused by bombing in 1945. Today they can be seen in the reconstructed castle in the Staatsgalerie Aschaffenburg, which was reopened in 2023 after several years of renovation. Despite the losses caused by wars, looting, and sales, the Aschaffenburg collection is considered the largest Cranach collection in Europe. In addition to 17 altar wings, some of which consist of several panels, and individual paintings from the Cranach workshop, 9 autographed works by the older and 2 by the younger Cranach are on display. In addition, a crucifixion group by Hans Baldung Grien and a large number of paintings by Cranach's students. Some other altars and paintings from the school are also preserved in St. Peter und Alexander's church and its museum. Other paintings are in the Alte Pinakothek in Munich.

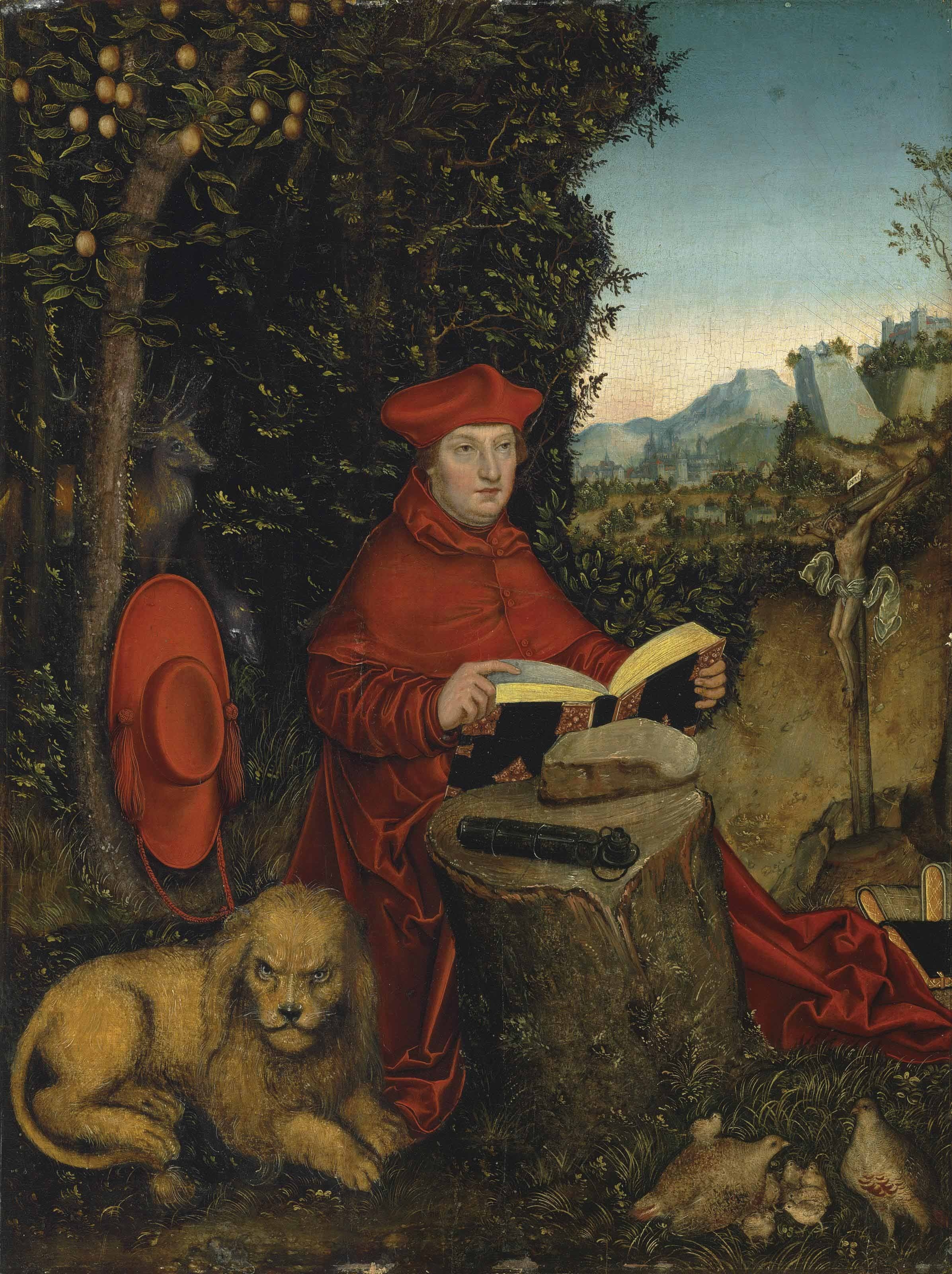
Cardinal Albert as Saint Jerome (Lucas Cranach the Elder)

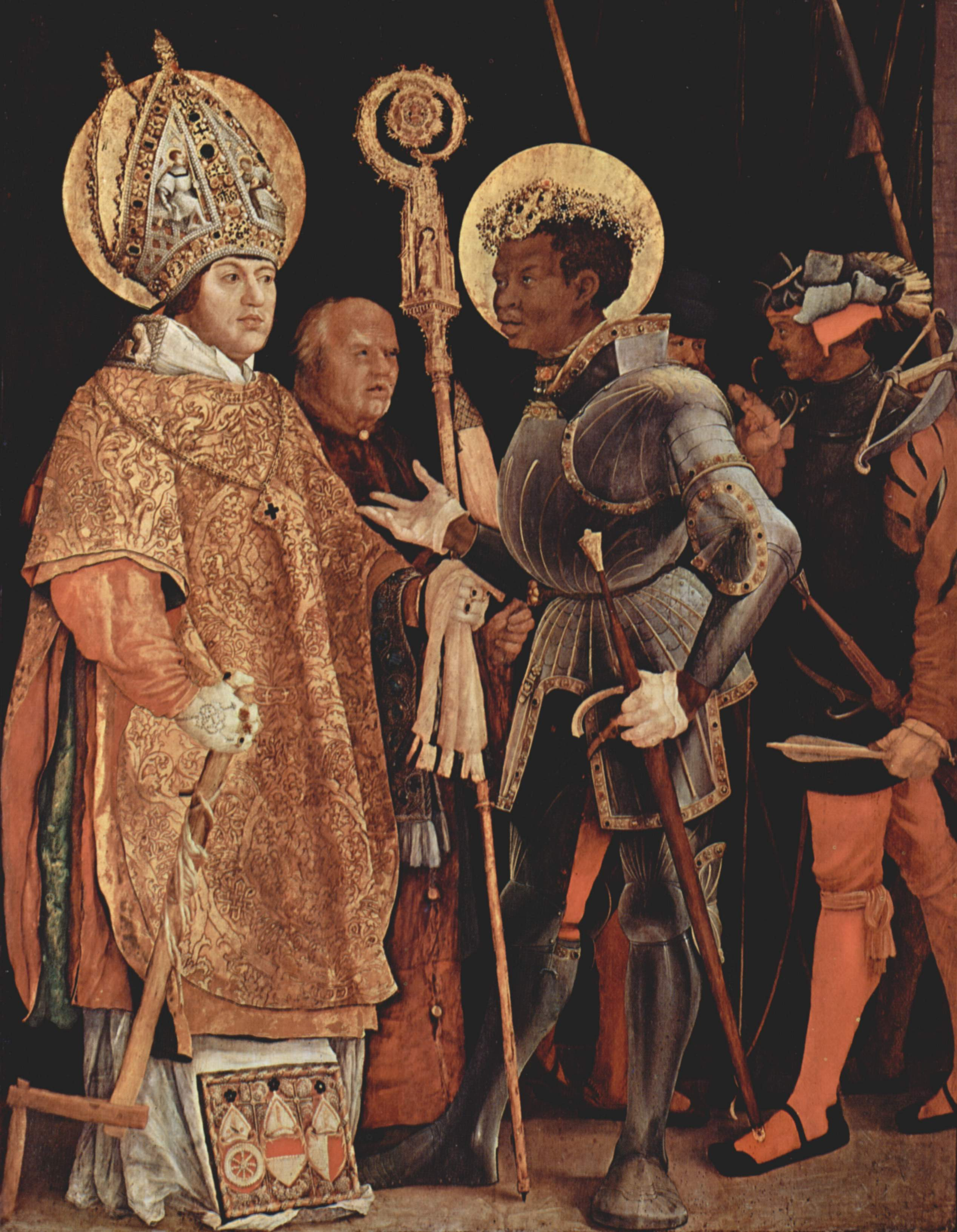
Cardinal Albert as Saint Erasmus with Saint Mauritius (Matthias Grünewald, c. 1520)

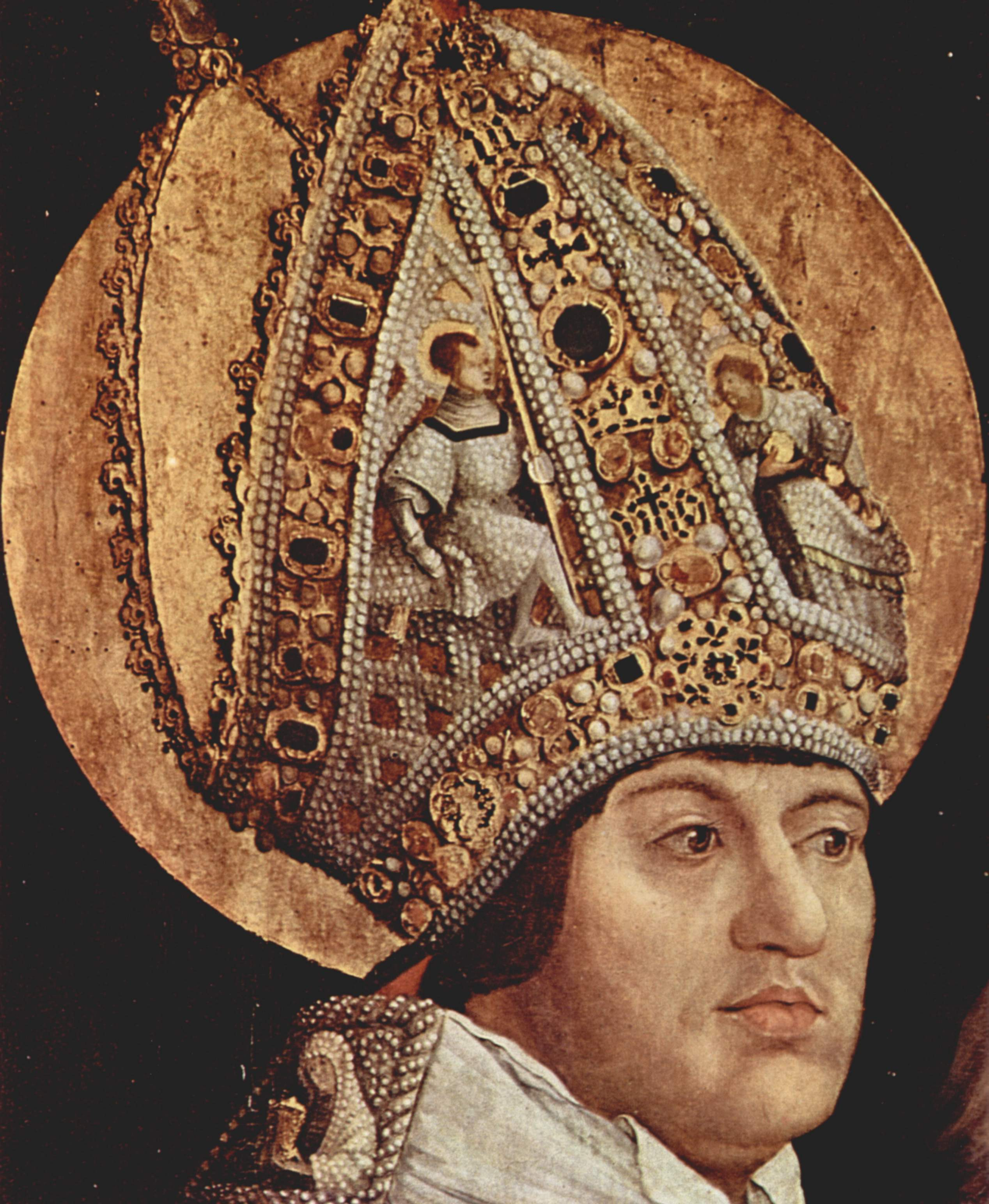
Cardinal Albert as Saint Erasmus (detail)

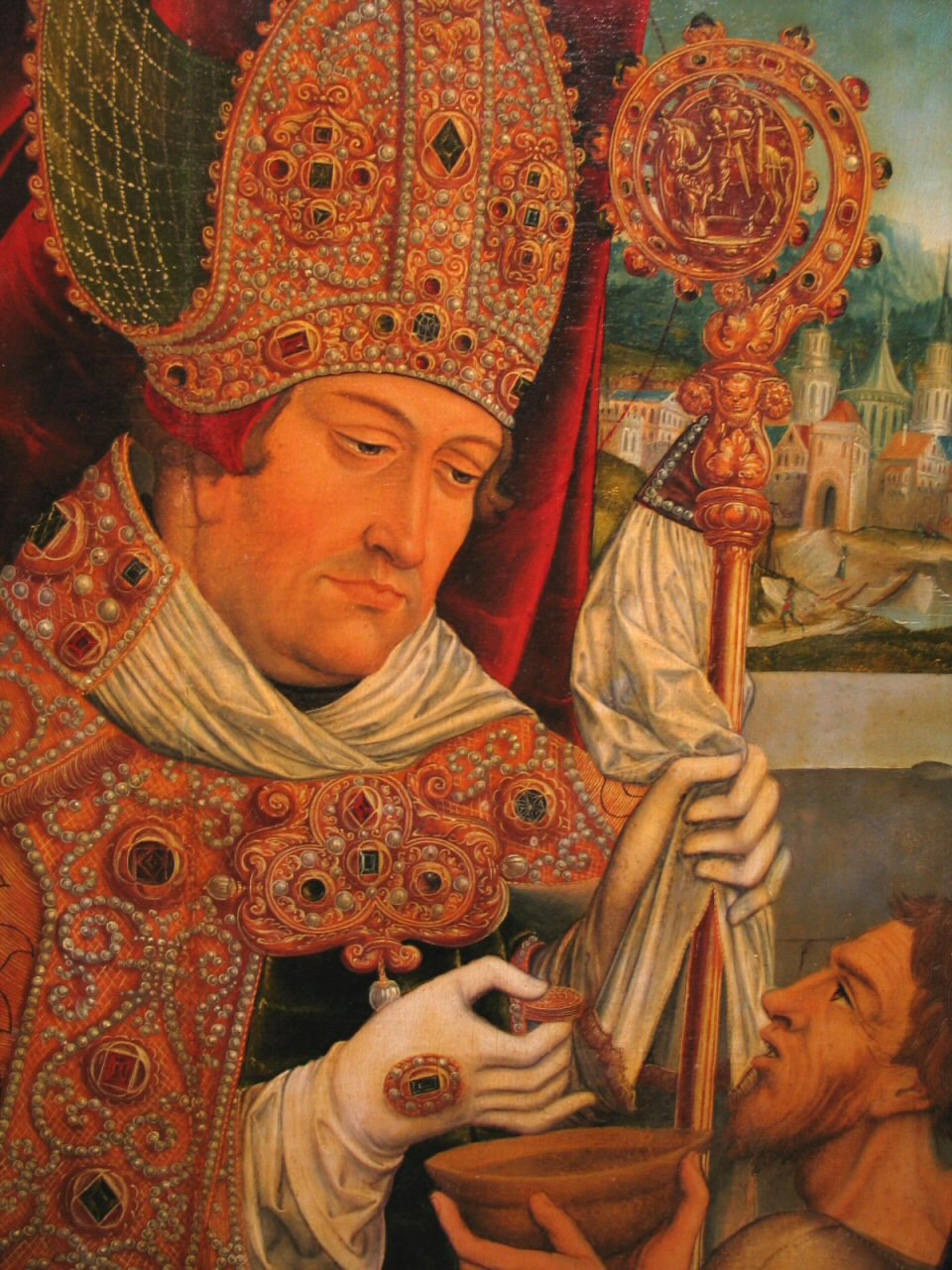
Cardinal Albert as Saint Martin (Simon Franck, 1543)

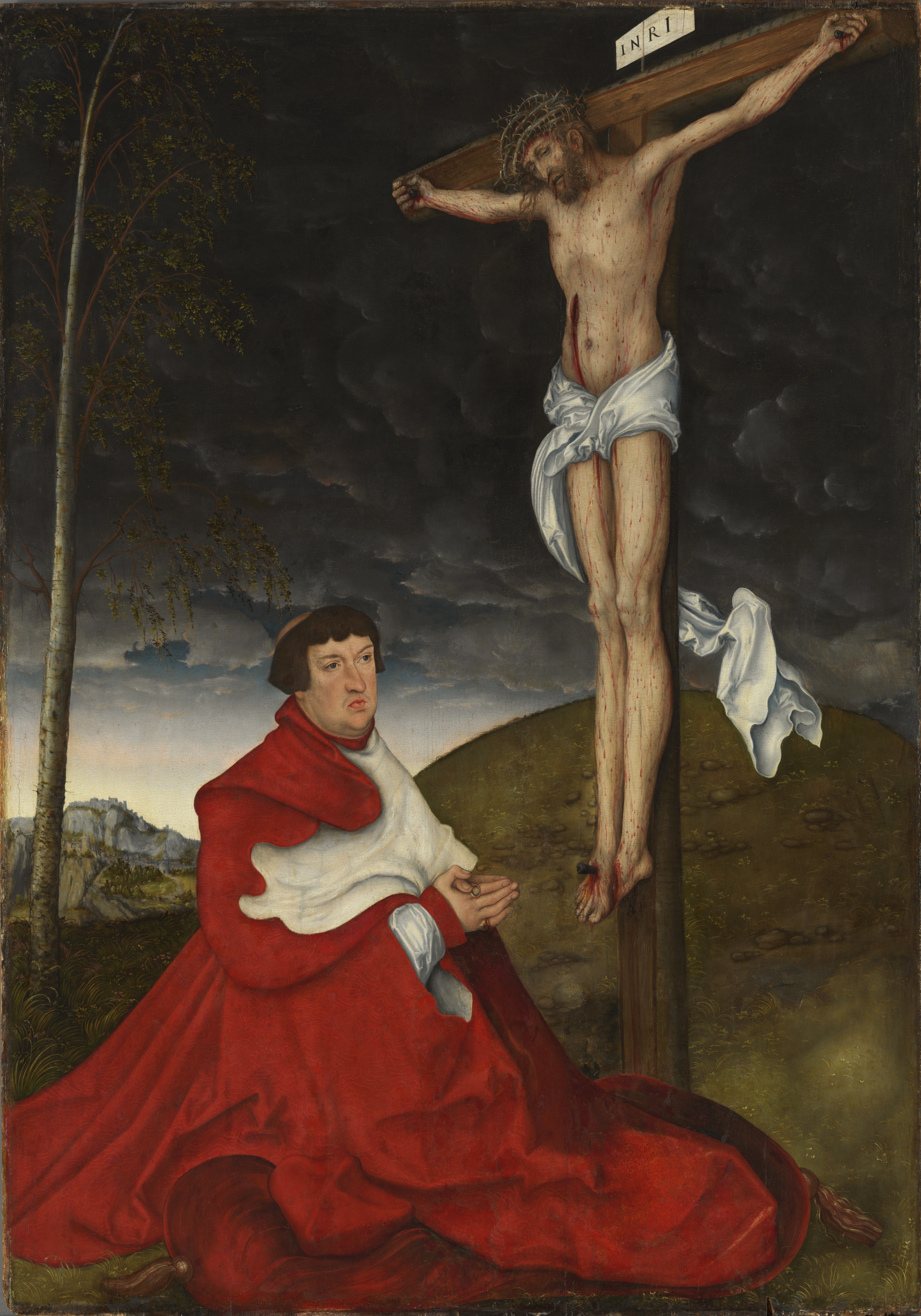
Cardinal Albert praying before the cross (Lucas Cranach the Elder)

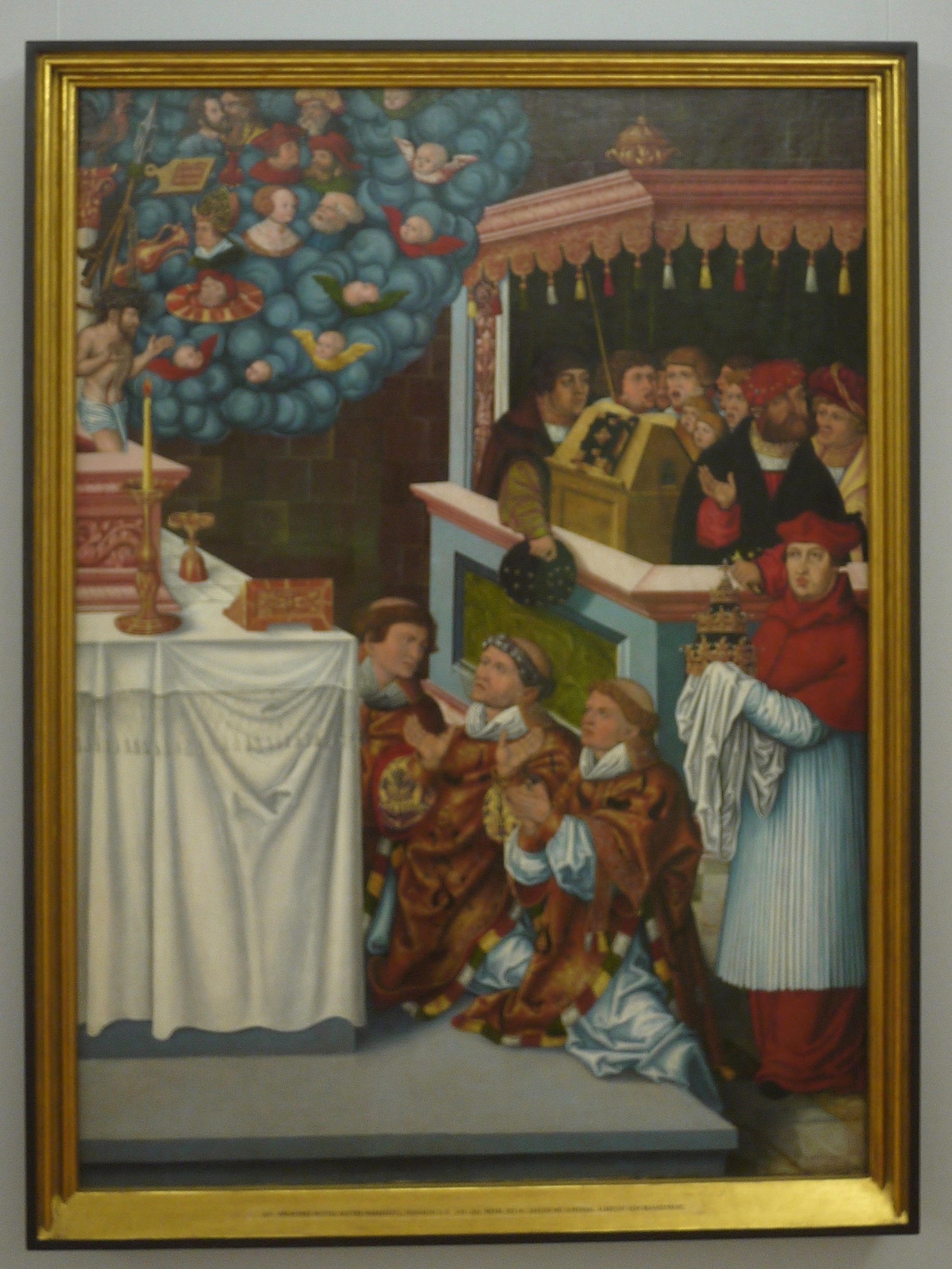
Mass of St. Gregory with Cardinal Albert (workshop of Lucas Cranach)

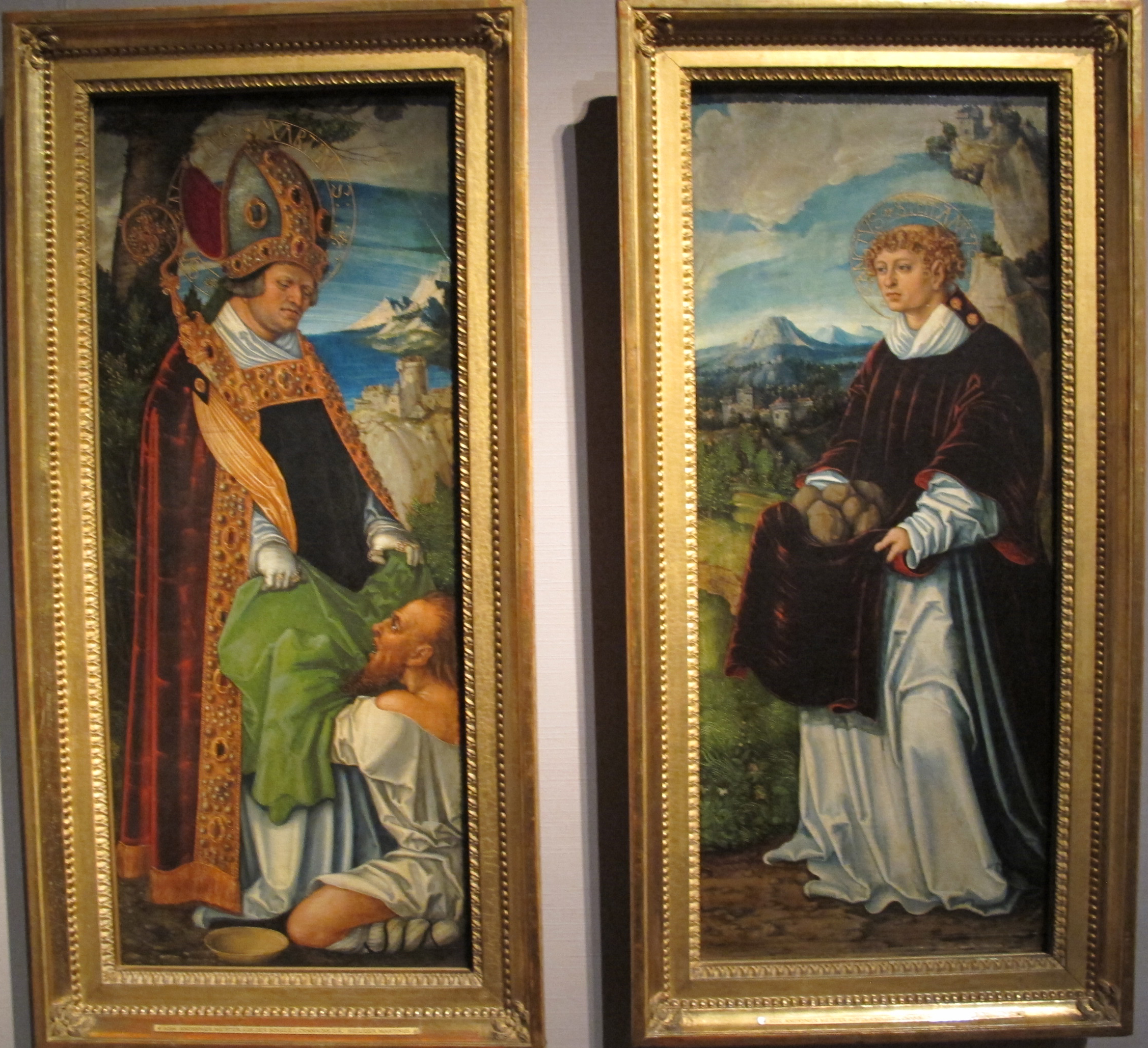
St. Martinus (with the facial features of Cardinal Albert) and St. Stephen (Lucas Cranach the Elder)

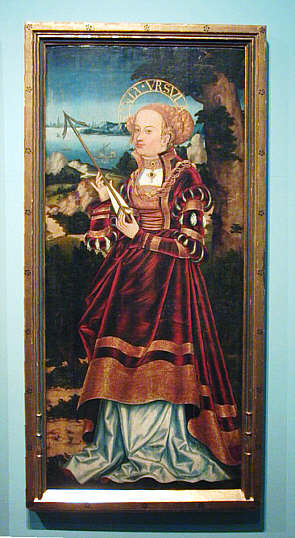
Cardinal Albert's mistress Leys Schütz as St. Ursula

== Death ==
Albert died at the Martinsburg, Mainz in 1545. His tomb is in Mainz Cathedral.

Albert of Brandenburg House of Hohenzollern Born: 28 June 1490 Died: 24 September 1545
Catholic Church titles
Preceded by Ernest II	Archbishop of Magdeburg; 1513–1545	Succeeded by John Albert as Administrator
Preceded by Ernest II	Bishop of Halberstadt; 1513–1545	Succeeded by John Albert as Administrator
Preceded by Uriel von Gemmingen	Archbishop-Elector of Mainz; 1514–1545	Succeeded by Sebastian von Heusenstamm
