= Erasmus of Formia =

Saint Elmo, Christian saint and martyr

Saint Erasmus of Formia
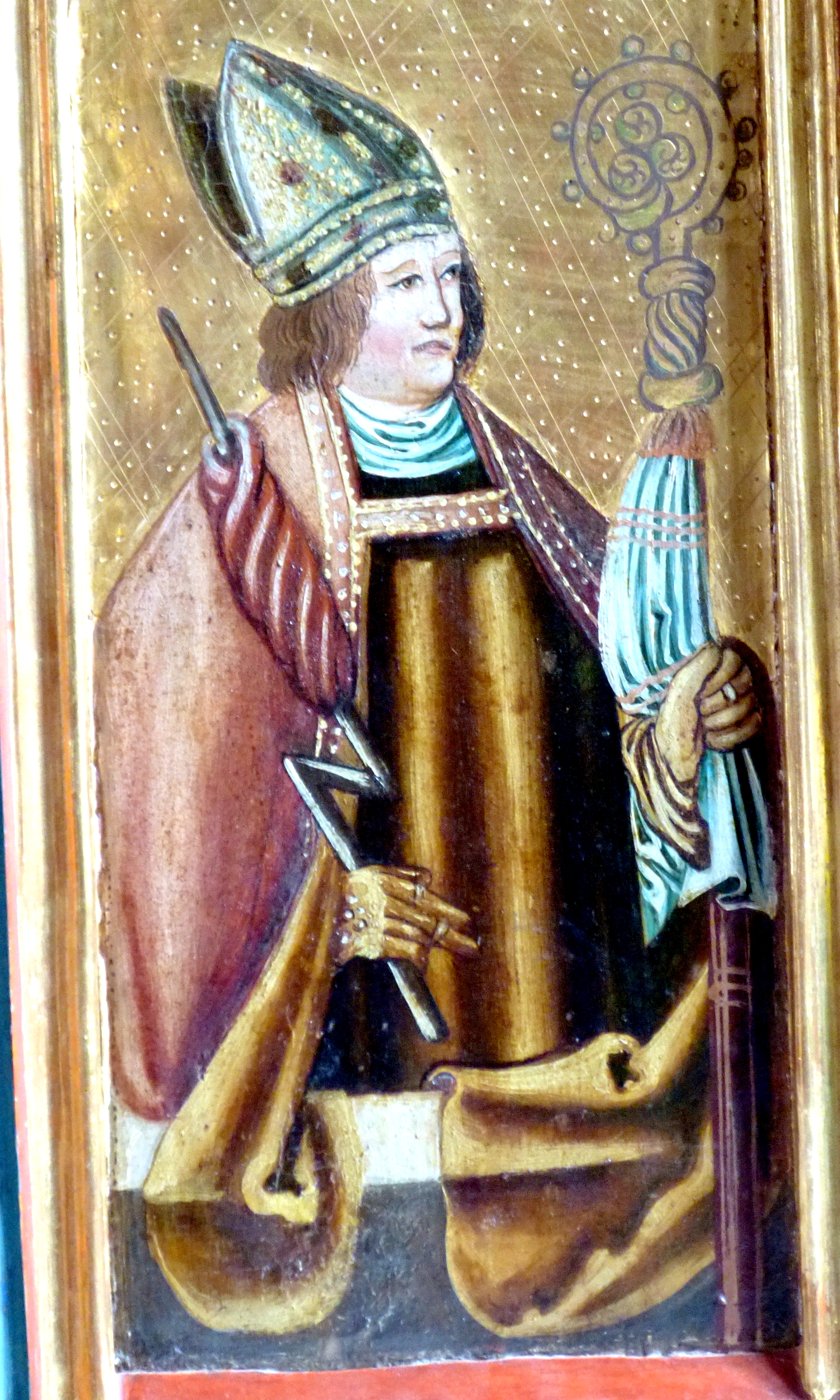
- Falkensteiner Altar Saint Erasmus by the Master of Meßkirch, c. 1530
- Born: 3rd century
- Died: c. 303; Illyricum (present-day Croatia)
- Venerated in: Eastern Orthodox Church; Roman Catholic Church
- Feast: 2 June
- Attributes: Represented with his entrails wound on a windlass or as a vested bishop holding a winch or windlass
- Patronage: Sailors, Bassiano, Gaeta, Santeramo in Colle, Formia, Roccagorga, colic in children, intestinal ailments and diseases, cramps and the pain of women in labor, cattle pest, Fort St. Elmo (Malta)

Erasmus of Formia, also known as Saint Elmo (died c. 303), was a Christian saint and martyr. He is venerated as the patron saint of sailors and abdominal pain. Erasmus or Elmo is also one of the Fourteen Holy Helpers, saintly figures of Catholicism who are venerated especially as intercessors.

== Documentation of his life ==
The Acts of Saint Elmo were partly compiled from legends that confuse him with a Syrian bishop Erasmus of Antioch. Jacobus de Voragine in the Golden Legend credited him as a bishop at Formia over all the Italian Campania, as a hermit on Mount Lebanon, and a martyr in the Diocletianic Persecution. There appears to be no historical basis for his passion.

== Account of life and martyrdom ==
Erasmus was Bishop of Formia, Italy. During the persecution against Christians under the emperors Diocletian (284–305) and Maximian (286–305), he left his diocese and went to Mount Libanus, where he hid for seven years. Around that time, an angel was purported to have appeared to him, and counseled him to return to his city.

On the way, he encountered some soldiers who questioned him. Erasmus admitted that he was a Christian and they brought him to trial at Antioch before the emperor Diocletian. After suffering terrible tortures, he was bound with chains and thrown into prison, but an angel appeared and helped him escape.

He passed through Lycia, where he raised up the son of an illustrious citizen. This resulted in a number of baptisms, which drew the attention of the Western Roman Emperor Maximian who, according to Voragine, was "much worse than was Diocletian." Maximian ordered his arrest and Erasmus continued to confess his faith. Angered, Maximian had Erasmus enclosed in a barrel full of protruding spikes and rolled down a hill. His survival is claimed to be the result of the intervention of an angel.

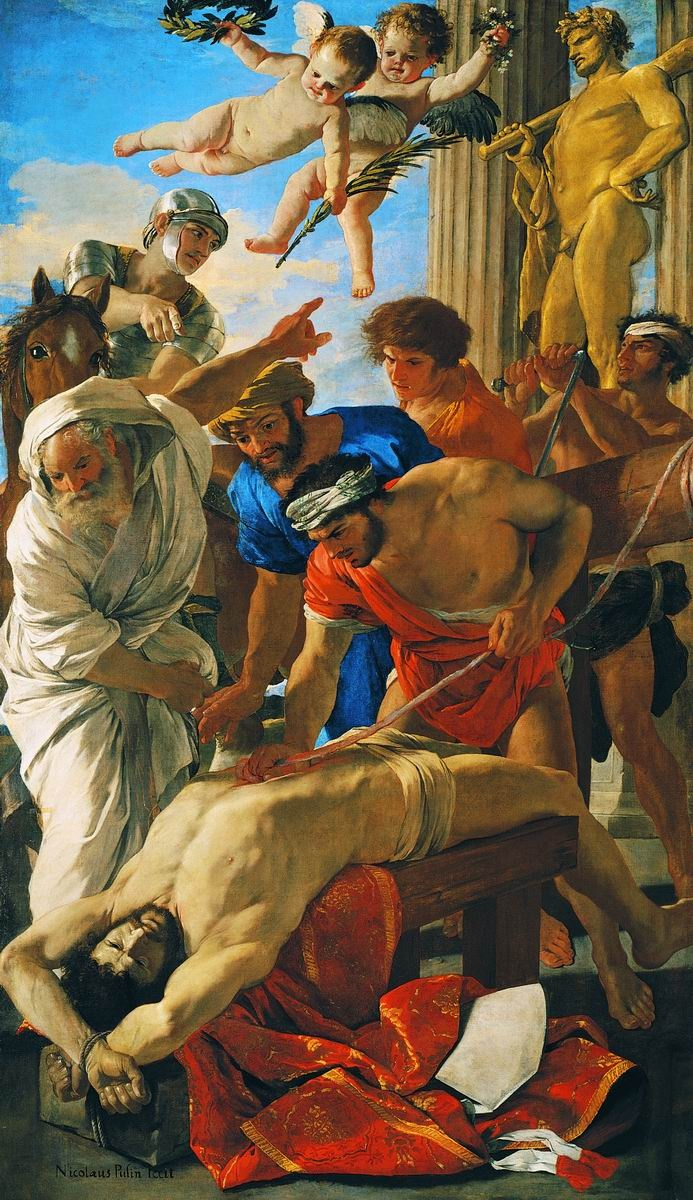
The Martyrdom of Saint Erasmus by Poussin

A number of unreliable legends fill Erasmus' story. Though he was thrown into prison with the intention of letting him die of starvation, Erasmus managed to escape. He was recaptured and tortured in the Roman province of Illyricum, after preaching and converting numerous pagans to Christianity. According to the traditional account, he was disemboweled; his abdomen slit open and his intestines wound around a windlass. This version may have developed from interpreting an icon that showed him with a windlass, signifying his patronage of sailors.

== Veneration and patronage ==
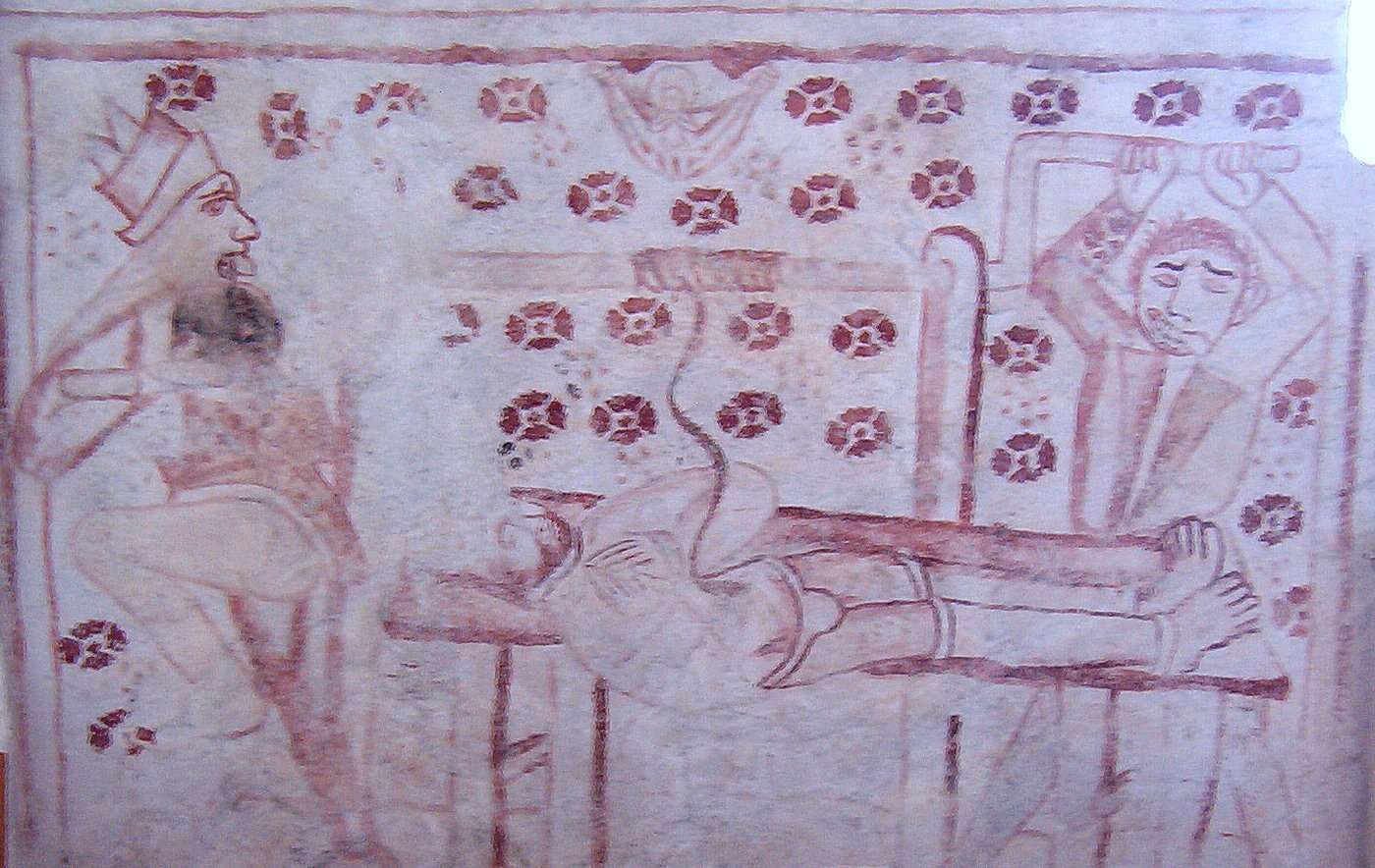
A 15th-century fresco painting held to be the torturing and dismemberment of Erasmus, in the Maria Church in Båstad left

Erasmus may have become the patron saint of sailors because he is said to have continued preaching even after a thunderbolt struck the ground beside him. This prompted sailors, who were in danger from sudden storms and lightning, to claim his prayers. The electrical discharges at the mastheads of ships were read as a sign of his protection and came to be called "Saint Elmo's Fire".

Pope Gregory the Great recorded in the 6th century that the relics of Erasmus were preserved in the cathedral of Formia. When the old Formiae was razed by the Saracens in 842, the cult of Erasmus was moved to Gaeta. He is currently the patron of Gaeta, Santeramo in Colle and Formia.

There is an altar to Erasmus in the north transept of St. Peter's Basilica. A copy of Nicolas Poussin's Martyrdom of St Erasmus serves as the altarpiece.

The skull of St. Erasmus, venerated as a relic, is purported to be in St. Peter's Church in Munich, Germany and some parts of his body are around in Europe.

Besides his patronage of mariners, Erasmus is invoked against colic in children, abdominal pain, intestinal ailments and diseases, cramps and the pain of women in labour, as well as cattle pests.

== Gallery ==
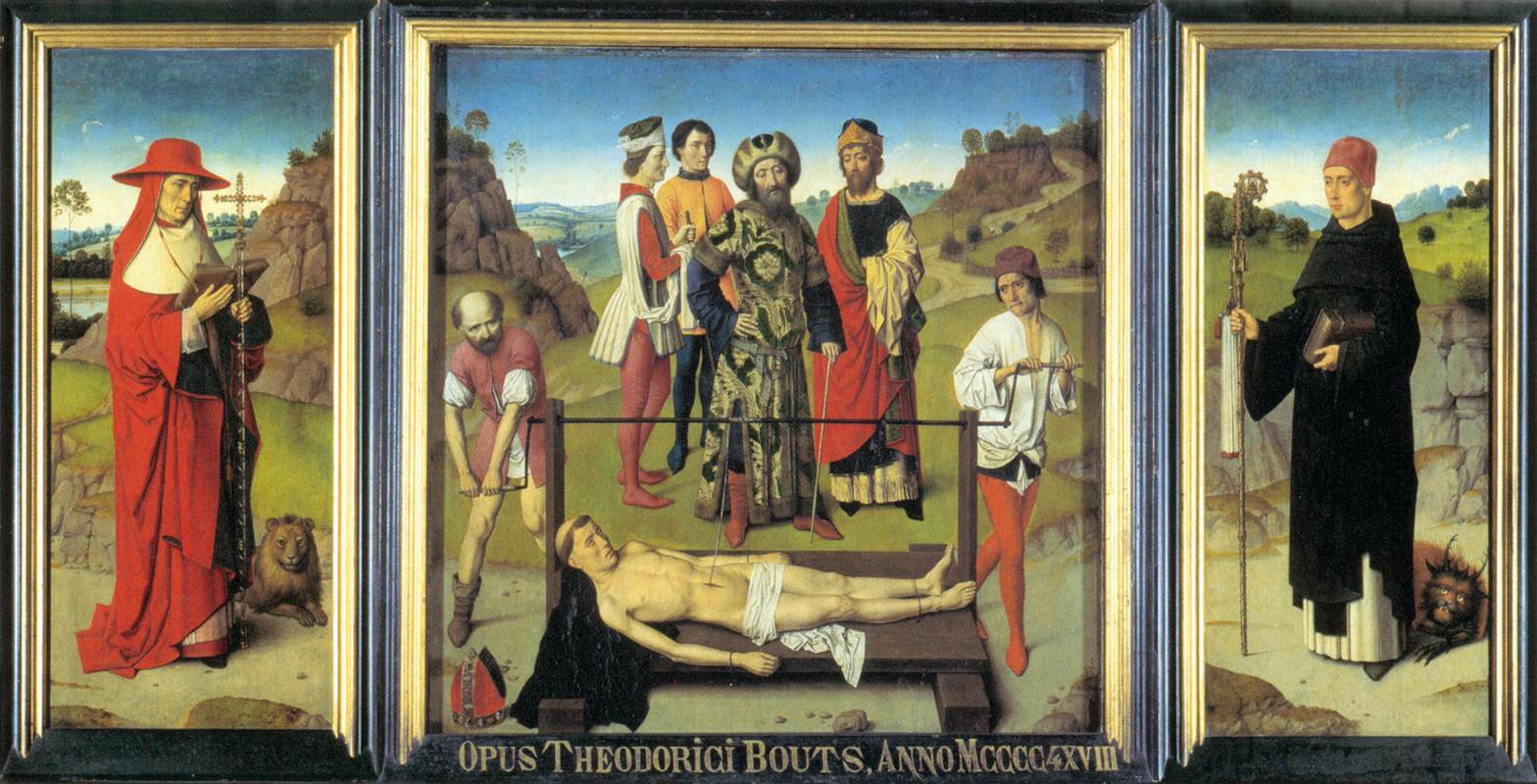
Dieric Bouts, Martyrdom of St Erasmus, Sint Pieterskirk, Leuven, Belgium, c. 1464

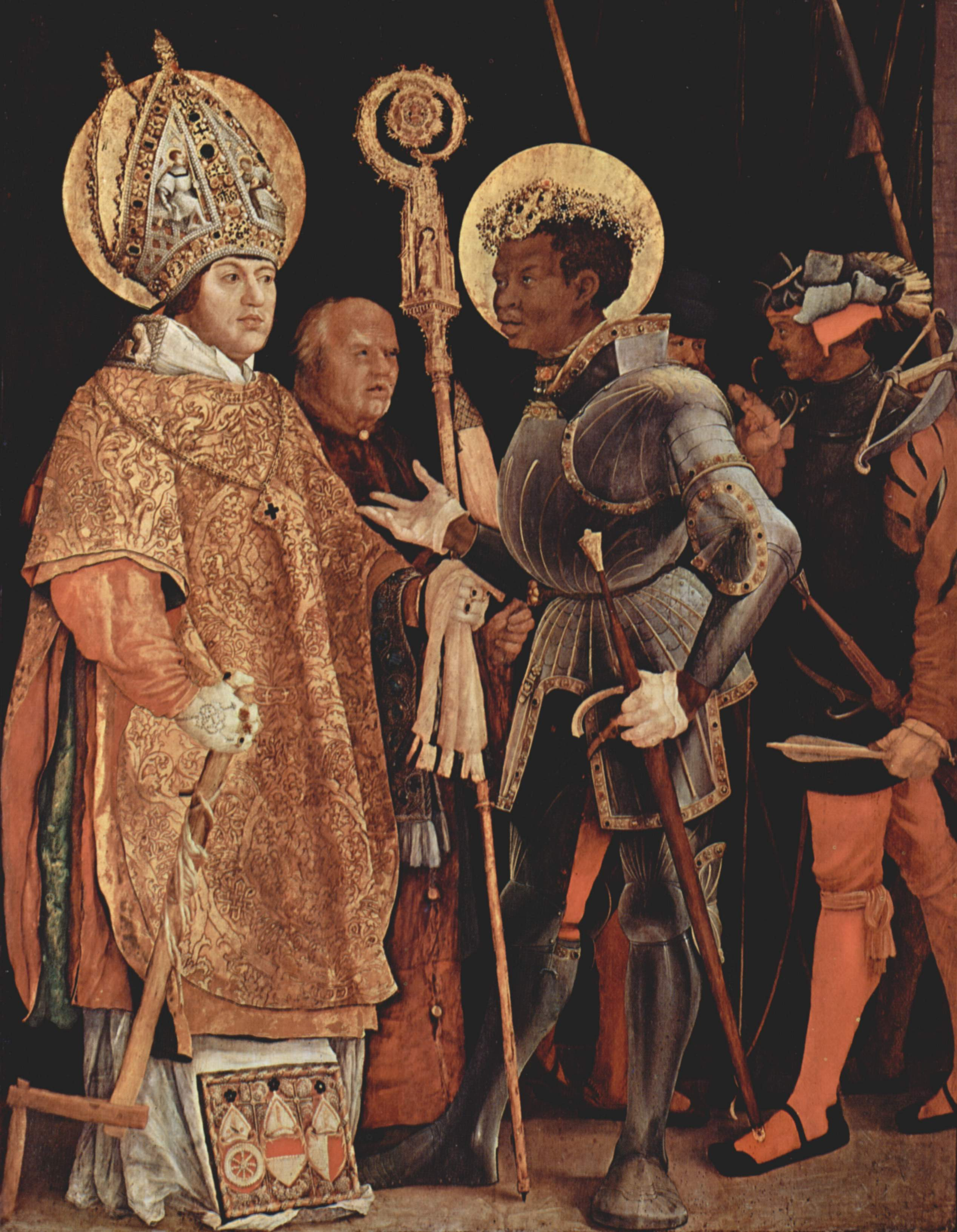
Saint Erasmus and Saint Maurice by Matthias Grünewald (1517–23), Alte Pinakothek. Grünewald used Albert of Mainz, who commissioned the painting, as the model for St. Erasmus.

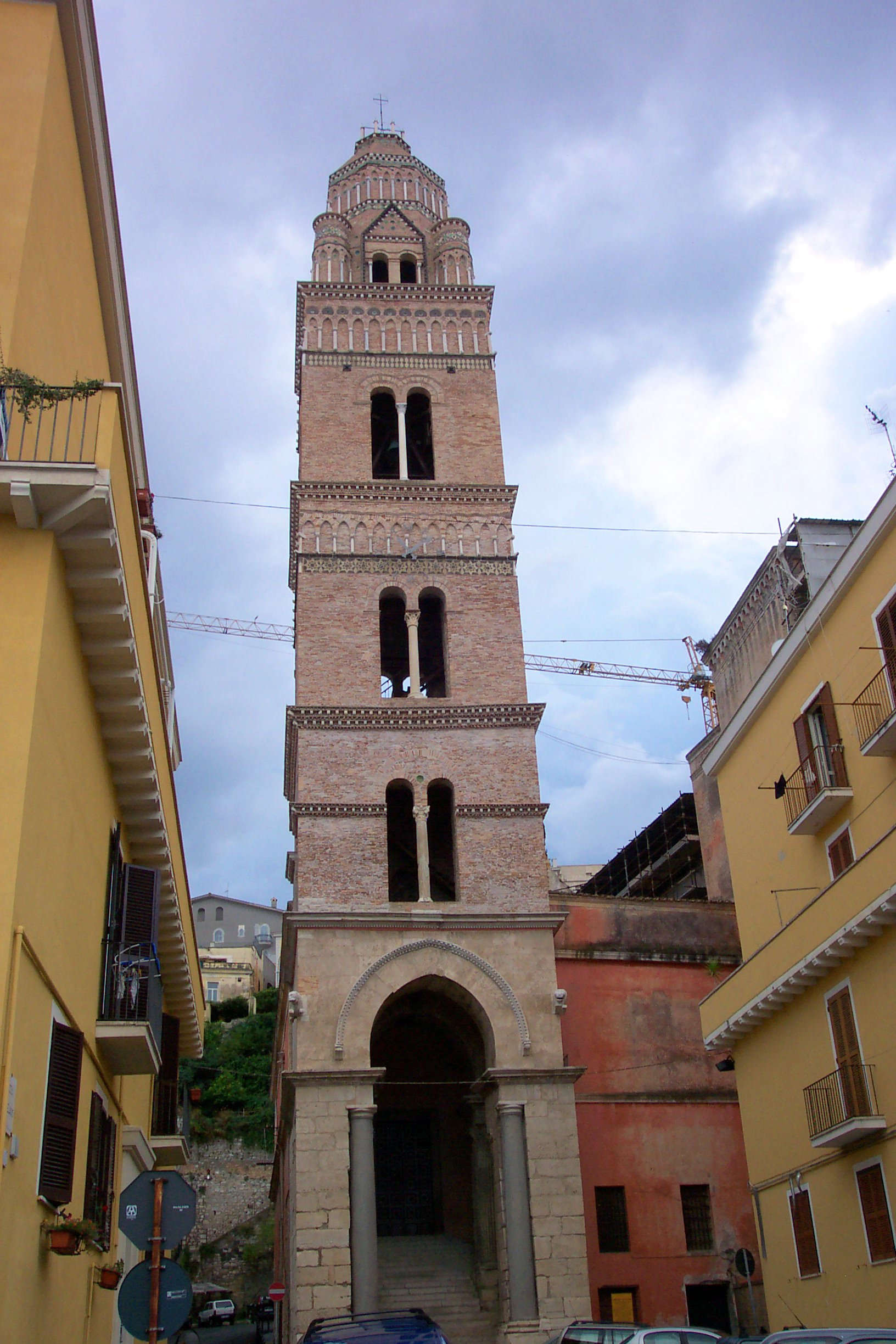
The bell tower of the Cathedral of St. Erasmus in Gaeta

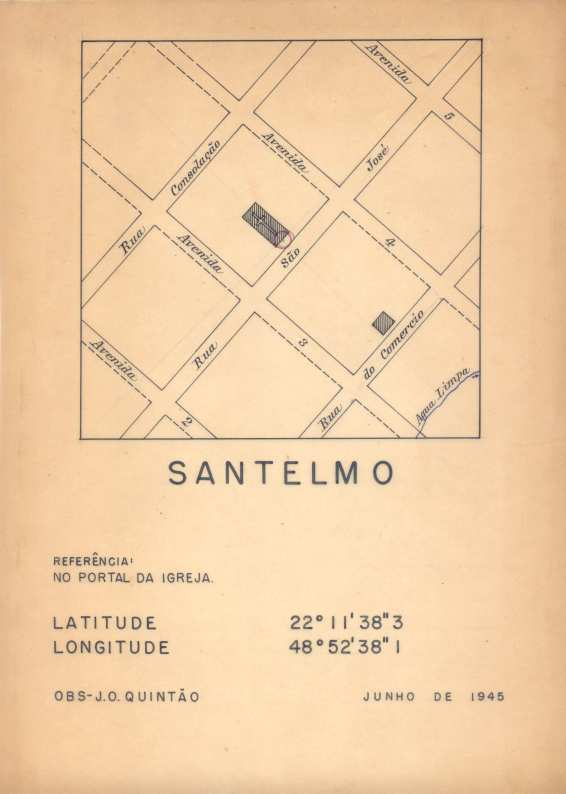
The martyrdom of Saint Elmo, by an unknown painter from the Netherlands, 1474

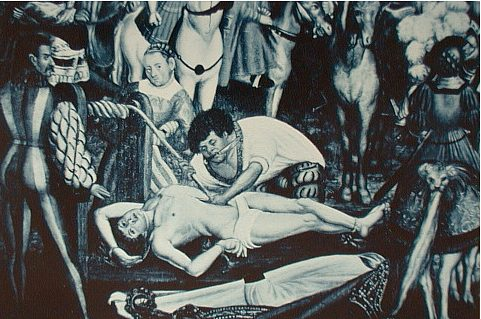
Martyrdom of Saint Erasmus

== See also ==
- St. Elmo Hall, a name for some chapter houses of Delta Phi fraternity
- St. Elmo's fire, a meteorological phenomenon named after the saint
- List of early Christian saints
- Saint Erasmus of Formia, patron saint archive
- Blessed Peter González, patron of Spanish and Portuguese mariners is also invoked as "San Telmo" or "San Elmo".
