= Erasmo Salemme =

Italian volleyball player and coach (born 1946)

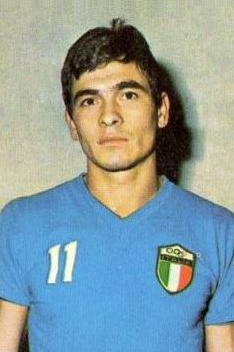

Personal information
- Born: 26 March 1946 (age 80); Rome, Italy
- Height: 1.92 m (6 ft 4 in)
- Weight: 84 kg (185 lb)

Career
Years	Teams
1964–1983	Ariccia Volley Club

National team
1965–1978	Italy
Honours
Representing Italy
Summer Universiade
Gold medal – first place	1970 Turin	Team
Mediterranean Games
Silver medal – second place	1975 Algiers	Team

Erasmo Salemme (born 26 March 1946) is a retired Italian volleyball player and coach. He won three national titles (1967–68, 1970–71 and 1972–73) with the Ruini Florence team. He played 231 matches with the Italian national team, winning a gold medal at the 1970 Turin Universiade, a silver at the 1975 Mediterranean Games, and finishing eights at the 1976 Summer Olympics.
