= Sant'Erasmo, Bassiano =

Church in Bassiano, Italy

Coordinates: 41.5497°N 13.0326°E

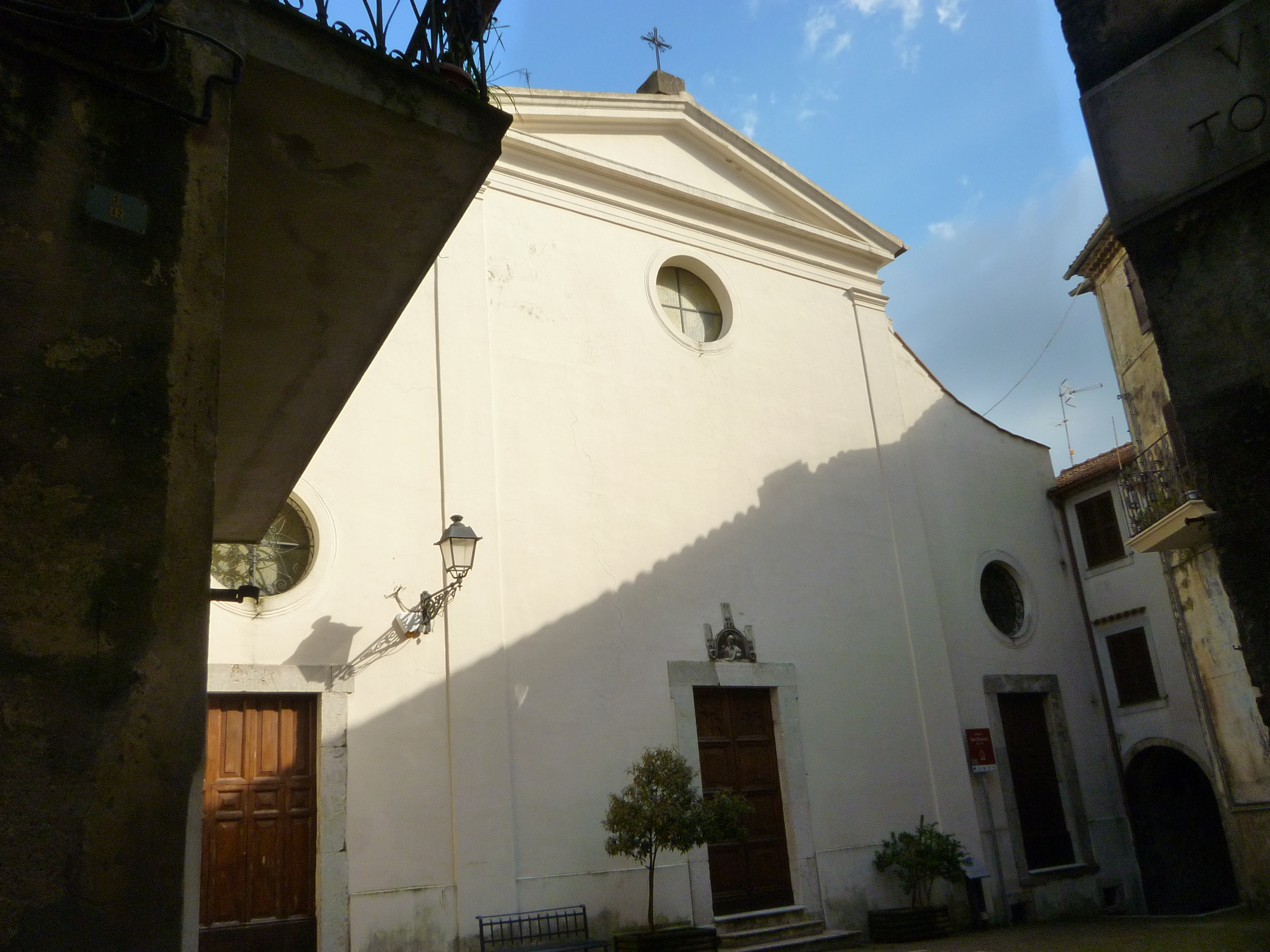
View of the facade

Sant'Erasmo is a Roman Catholic church located in Bassiano, province of Latina, region of Lazio, central Italy.

== History ==
The church was built from the ruins of a 14th-century church destroyed by lightning. In 1530 it was fully rebuilt, and in the 19th-century underwent refurbishment which modified the church with Neoclassical architecture. The façade has a bas-relief of Christ blessing. The Church is divided into three naves with a semicircular nave. The wooden choir was sculpted in 1852 by Frattini. Above the choir are three canvases: the central one (1599) was painted by Francesco da Castello Flander. Off the left nave, a small chapel has a Romanesque baptismal font from the 12th century.
