= Erasmo Fuentes =

Mexican sculptor

Erasmo Fuentes de Hoyos (born 1943) is a Mexican-born member of the Church of Jesus Christ of Latter-day Saints and sculptor who resides in Mapleton, Utah. Among his more well known works is "Anxiously Engaged" (made with his son Alex Fuentes) which is a 7-foot-tall (2.1 m) sculpture of Mormon missionaries on bikes; the sculpture is displayed at the Missionary Training Center in Provo, Utah.

Fuentes was born in Monterrey, Nuevo León, Mexico, but was raised in Saltillo, Mexico as a Latter-day Saint. He first came to the United States to work in 1964 and studied sculpture at Brigham Young University, graduating in 1968. He also was on the BYU Ballroom Dance Company, which was founded by his uncle, Benjamin F. de Hoyos. Fuentes studied particularly under Dallas Anderson.

Fuentes had first trained in modeling in the taxidermy shop of his father, Arturo Fuentes.

For several years prior to 1984, Fuentes ran a wood pallet construction factory in Saltillo with his wife Cynthia. The factory went under in 1984 and Fuentes decided to become a full-time sculptor. He was commission by the government to make a sculpture for the 400th anniversary of Saltillo. This was commission by the governor of the state of Coahuila. This four-figure sculpture which is 18 feet (5.5 m) tall is the most famous sculpture in the state of Coahuila. Fuentes' sculpture "Rose" is part of the permanent collection of the Springville Art Museum.

Fuentes is also a guitar player. He has formed a duo with singer Rebecca Lopez and also was part of El Trio Illusion with Carlos Saine and Dante Moreno.

Fuentes and his wife are the parents of five children.
