= Adelsberger =

Adelsberger is a surname. Notable people with the surname include:

- Abraham Adelsberger (1863–1940), German toy factory owner, councilor of commerce and art collector
- Lucie Adelsberger (1895–1971), German Jewish physician and holocaust survivor
