= Staatsgalerie Aschaffenburg =

Coordinates: 49.9761°N 9.1417°E

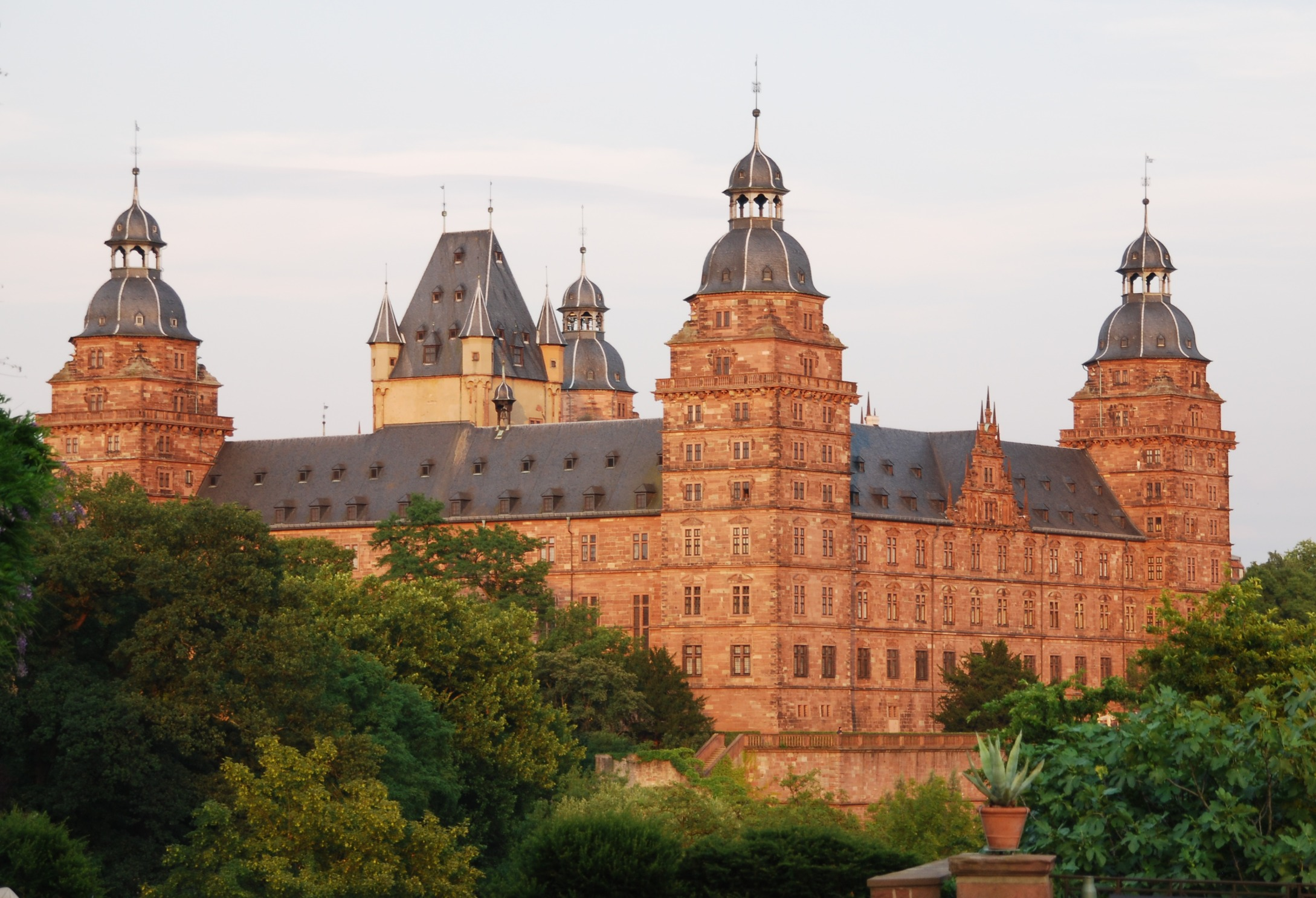
Schloss Johannisburg Aschaffenburg

The Staatsgalerie Aschaffenburg ("State Gallery Aschaffenburg") is an art museum in Schloss Johannisburg in Aschaffenburg, Germany. With some 368 paintings, it is the largest of the galleries outside Munich making up the Bavarian State Painting Collections.

The origin and main part of the museum is the collection of Friedrich Karl Joseph von Erthal, Elector of Mainz, who lived in Johannisburg from 1792 until his death in 1802. The focus lies on German and Netherlandic paintings, mainly genre paintings.

== Selection of works ==
- Abraham Bloemaert, The preaching of John the Baptist
- Follower of Adriaen Brouwer, Farmers at the fire
- Aert de Gelder, Passion
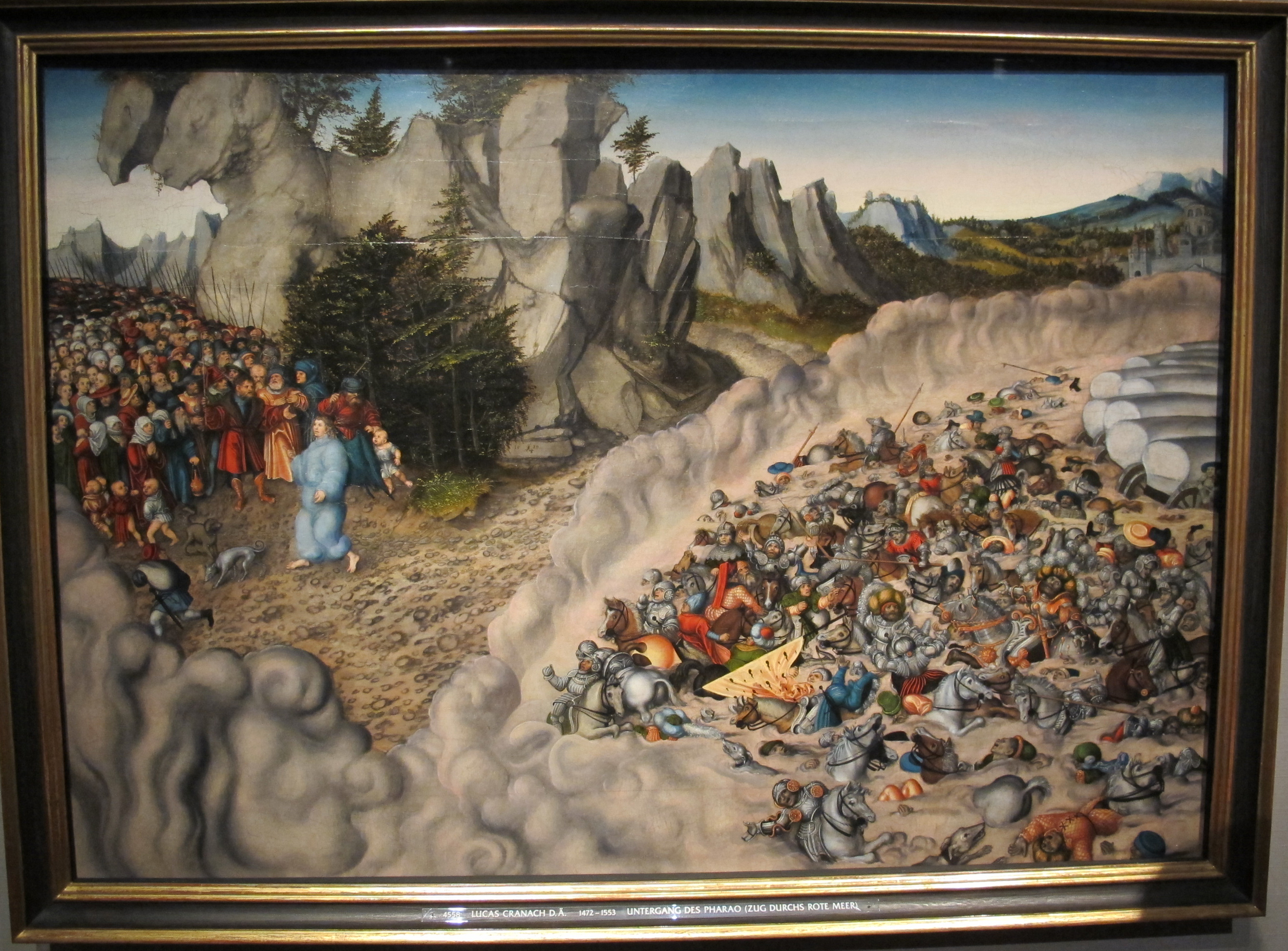
Lucas Cranach the Elder, Crossing the Red Sea

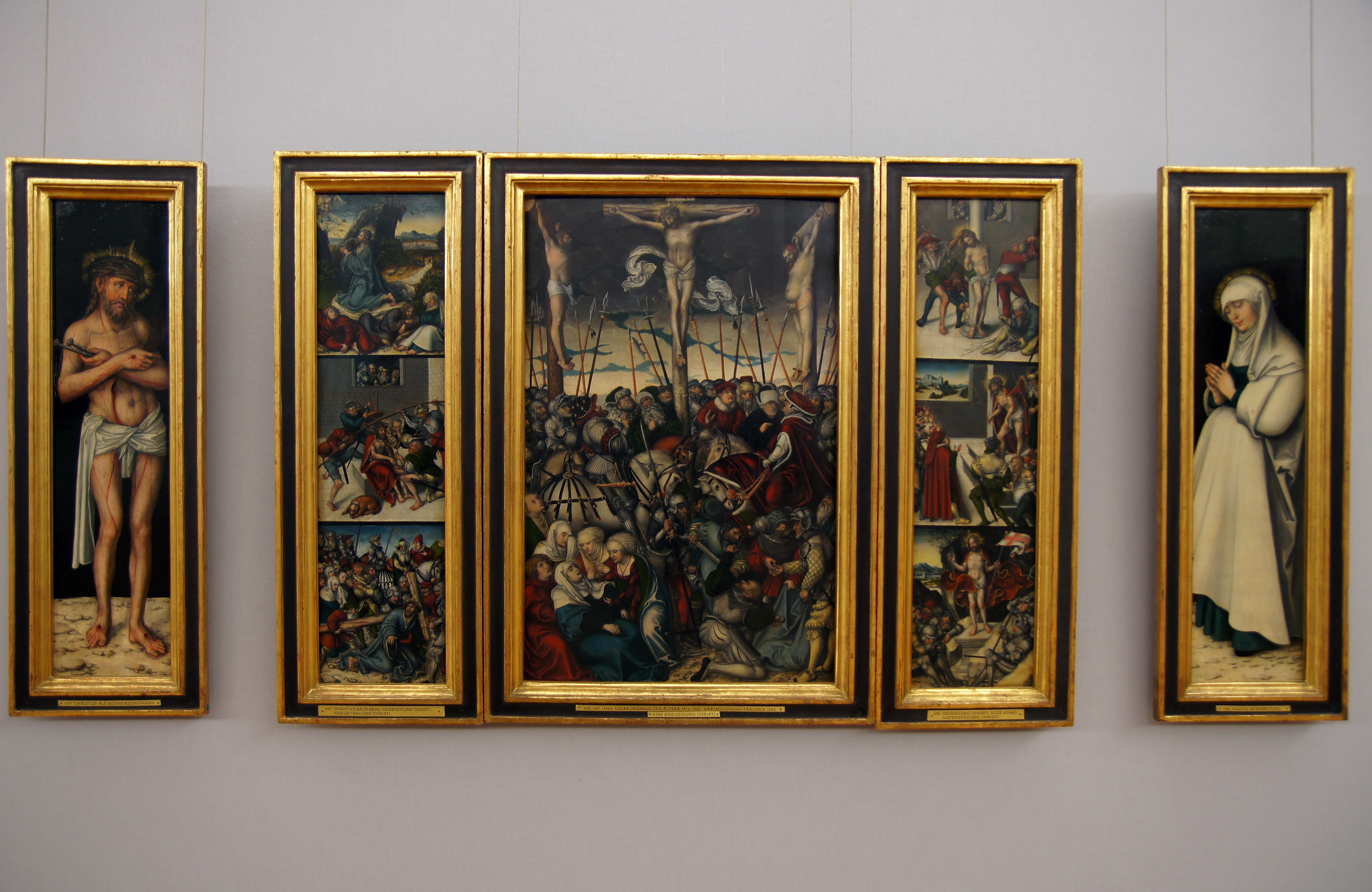
Lucas Cranach the Elder, Crucifixion Altar

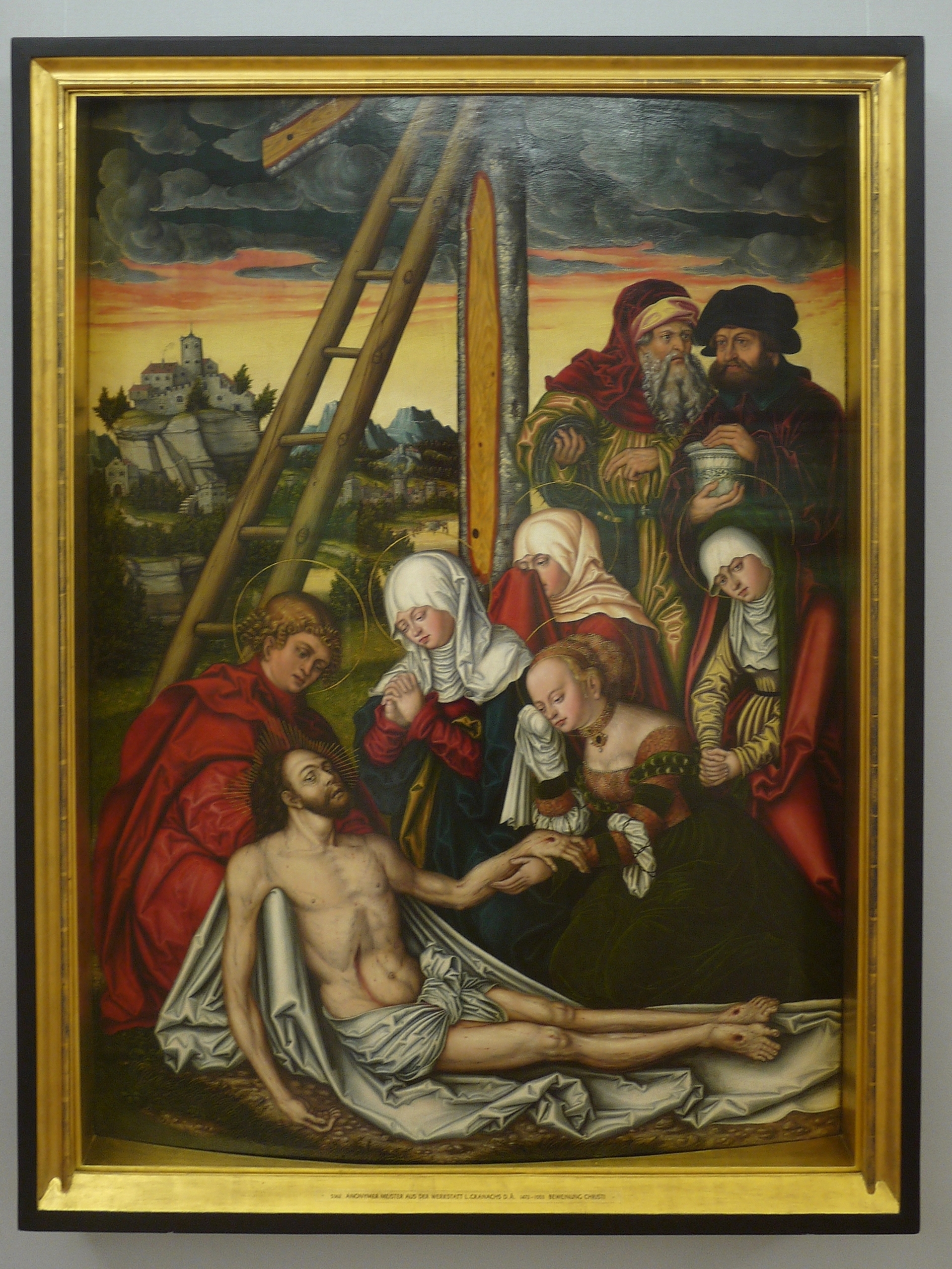
Anonymous, school of Lucas Cranach the Elder, Mourning the dead Christ

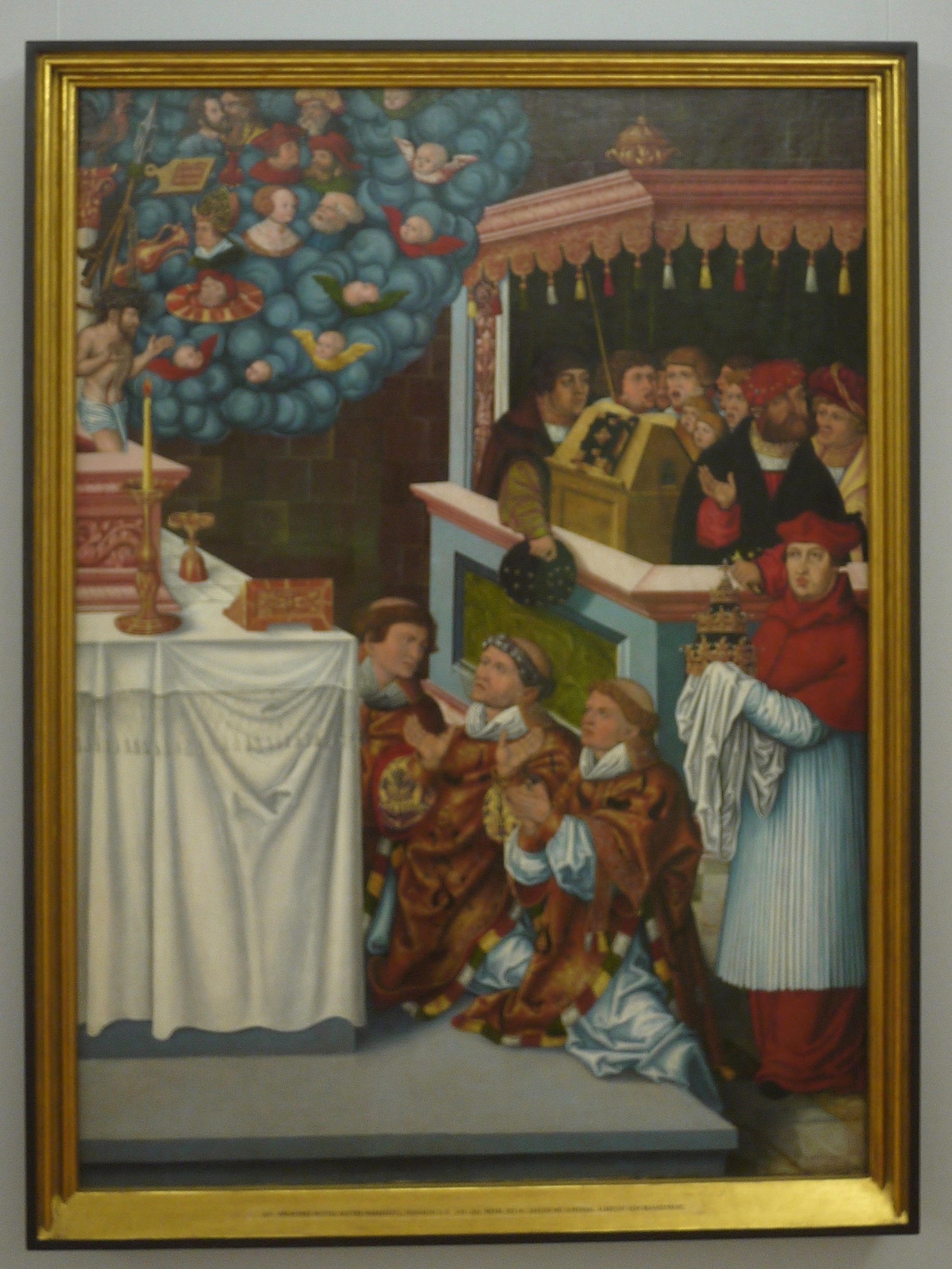
Anonymous, workshop of Lucas Cranach the Elder, The Mass of Saint Gregory

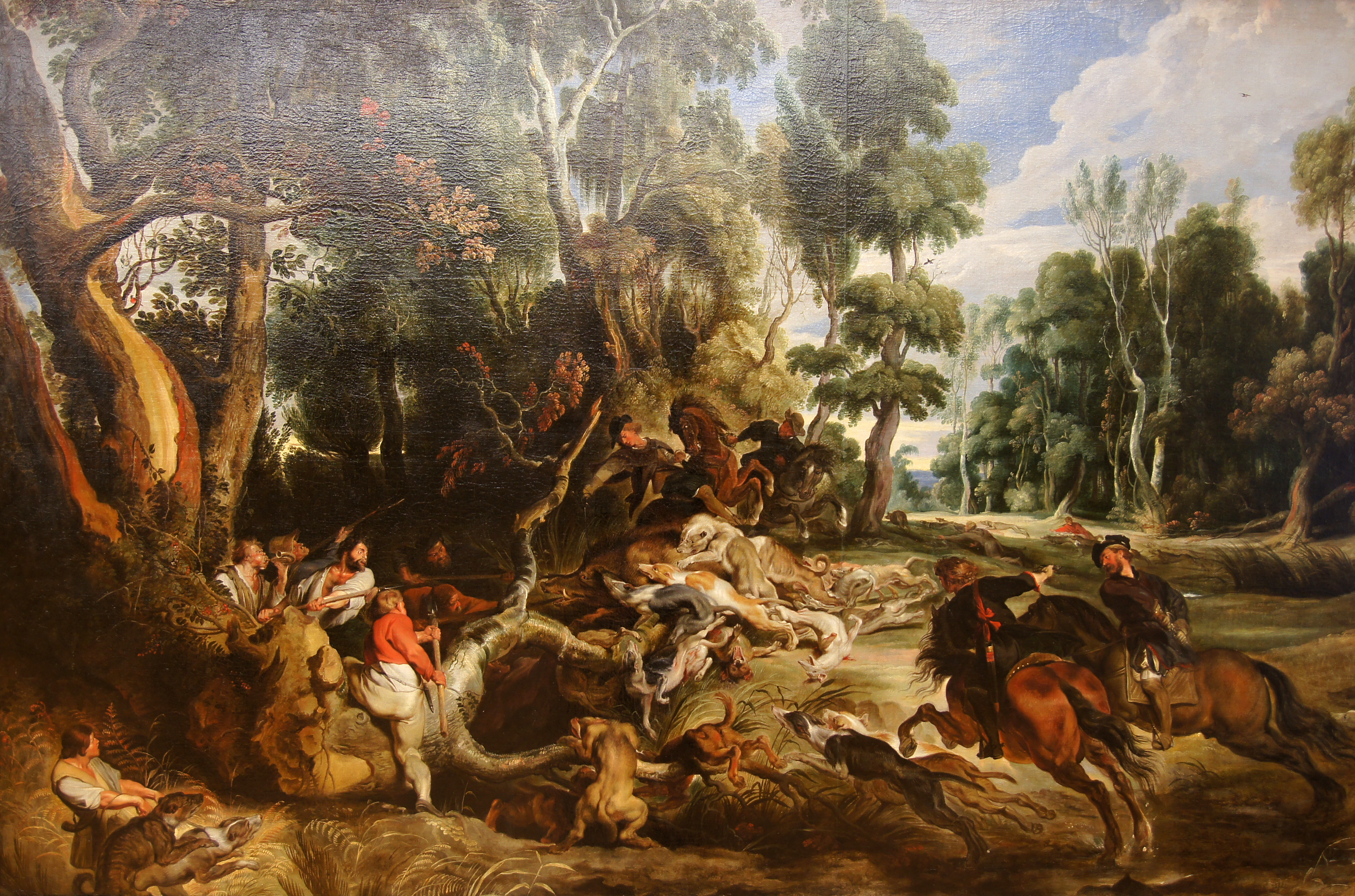
Peter Paul Rubens, Wild boar hunt

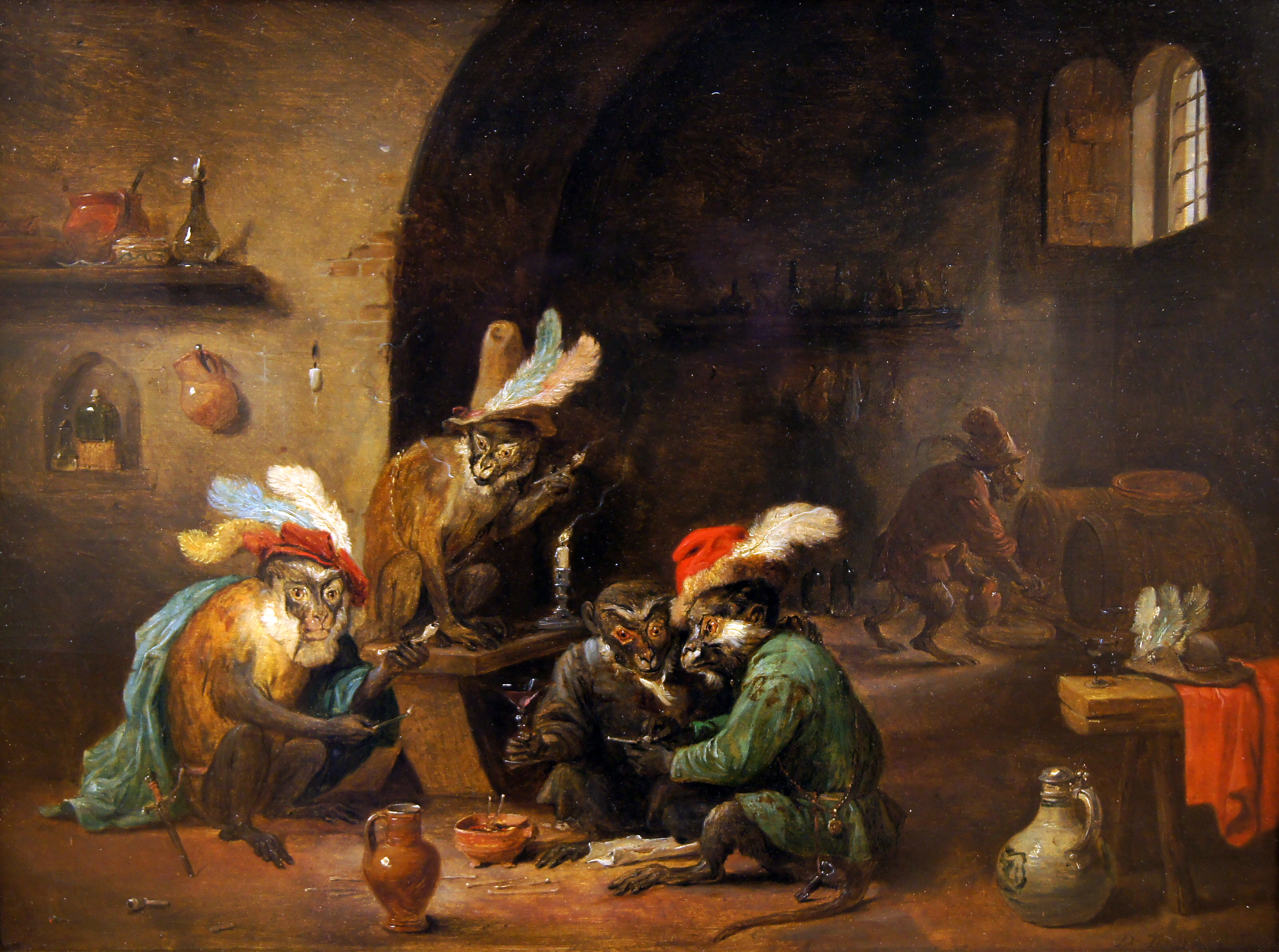
David Teniers the Younger, Costumised monkeys

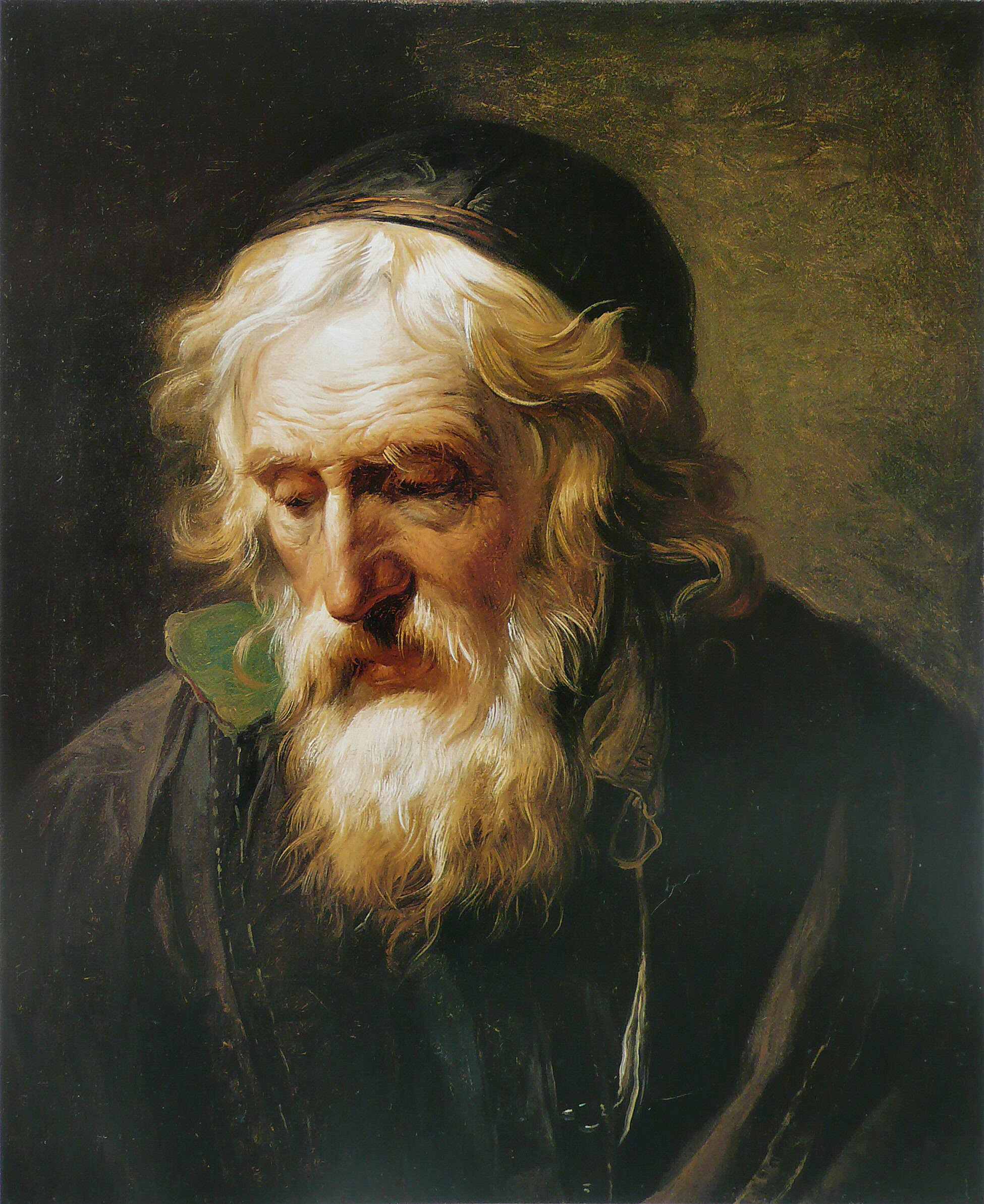
François-André Vincent, Greek priest
