= Jan Vermeulen =

Dutch painter

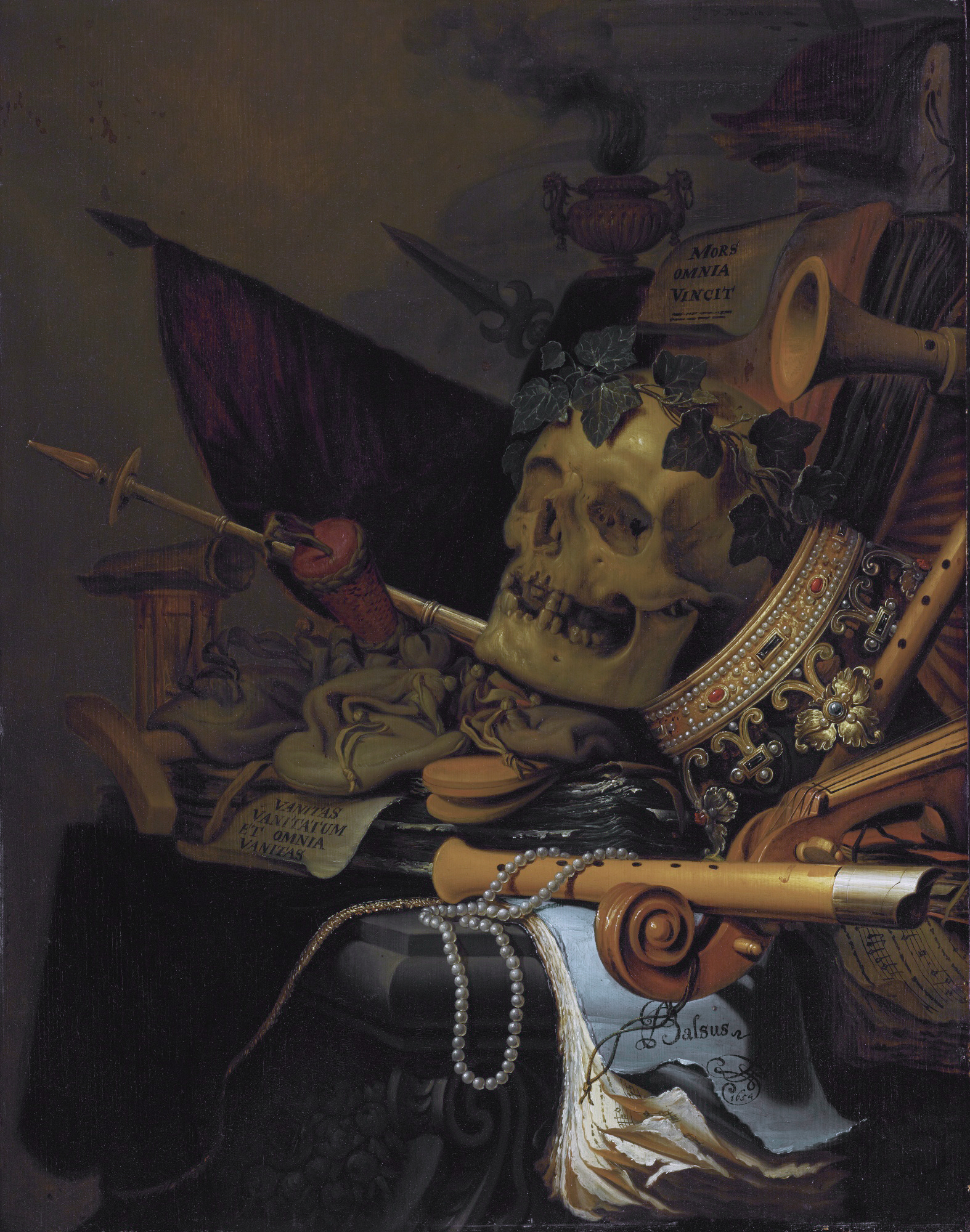
Vanitas: Skull with an Ivy Wreath

Johannes van der Molen or Johannes Jan Vermeulen was a still-life painter during the Dutch Golden Age. He was active in Haarlem from 1638 to 1674. His specialty was the Vanitas, a style of painting meant to symbolize the transience of life. Many of them feature books.

== Life and work ==
Nothing is known about his artistic training. He is documented for the first time in 1638 in Haarlem. In 1651, he is on an archival list of the Guild of Saint Luke, as a member and a citizen of Haarlem, under the name Johannes van der Meulen.

In 1674, he is recorded in church documents as having been married for the second time, after which no further mention of him has yet been discovered.

Very few works by this artist are known with any certainty. In addition to books, they include scientific objects and musical instruments, with a limited color range.

Paintings with the monogram IVM, dating from 1661 may be his, although some sources say those works belong to an Isaac Vermeulen.

Some of his works may be seen at the Statens Museum for Kunst, Mauritshuis, Schloss Johannisburg and the Musée des beaux-arts de Nantes. Others are in private collections.

== Auctions ==
The painting Still life with an open book is part of an Old Masters auction with Sotheby's London 2020 May 7.
