= St Catharine's Convent =

St Catharine's Convent may refer to:

- St Catharine's Convent, Augsburg, Germany
- St Catharine's Convent, Edinburgh, Scotland

== See also ==
- St. Catherine (disambiguation)
