= Bavarian State Painting Collections =

Artworks owned by the German state of Bavaria

Coordinates: 48°8′58.5″N 11°34′18.4″E

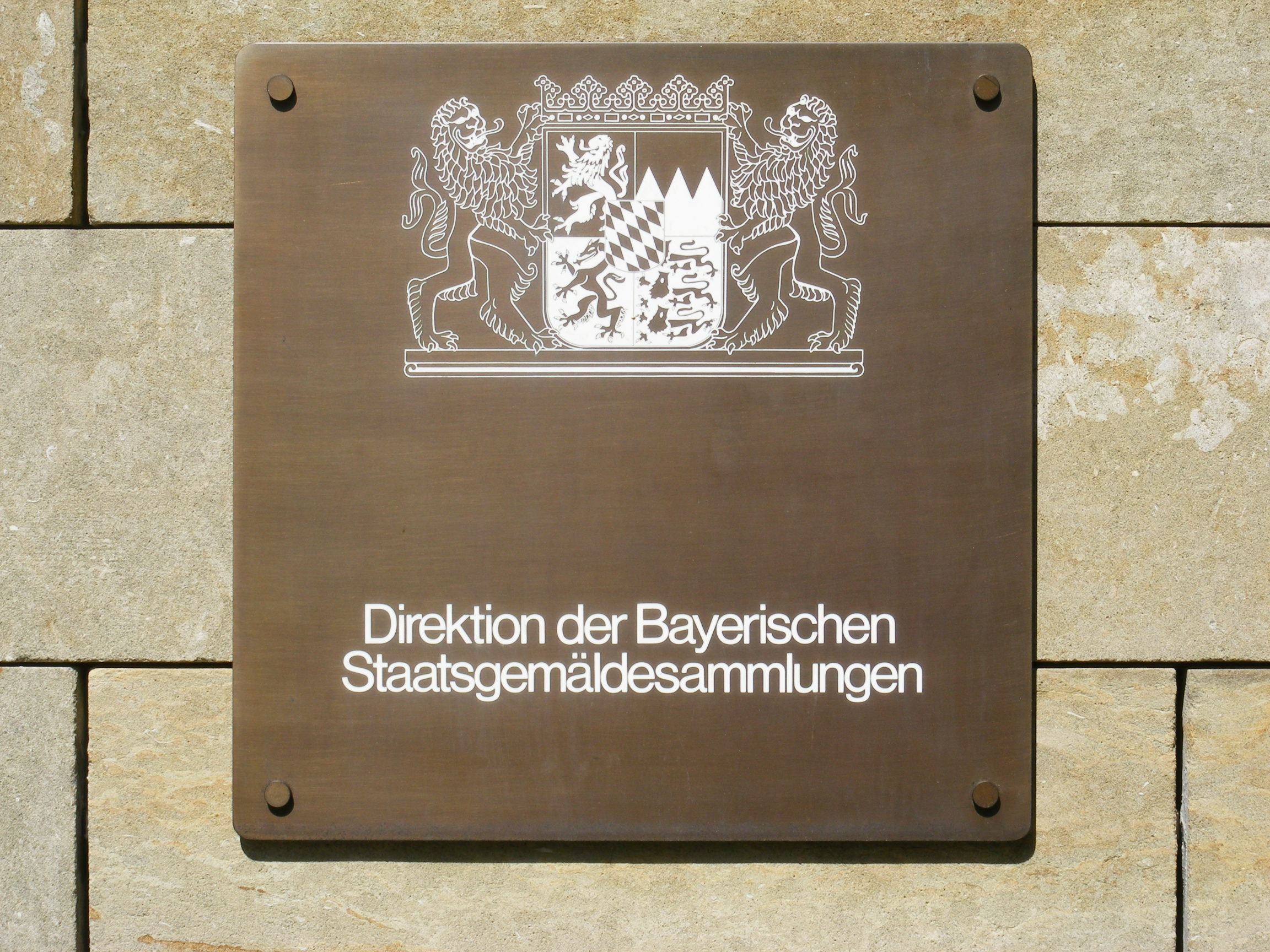
Direktion der Bayerischen Staatsgemäldesammlungen (Bavarian State Painting Collections) administration plaque

The Bavarian State Painting Collections (German: Bayerische Staatsgemäldesammlungen), based in Munich, Germany, oversees artwork held by the Free State of Bavaria. It was established in 1799 as Centralgemäldegaleriedirektion. Artwork includes paintings, sculptures, photographs, video art and installation art. Pieces are on display in numerous galleries and museums throughout Bavaria.

== Galleries in Munich ==
- Alte Pinakothek (Old Picture Gallery)
- Neue Pinakothek (New Picture Gallery)
- Pinakothek der Moderne (Modern Picture Gallery)
- Schackgalerie
- Museum Brandhorst

== Galleries outside Munich ==
- Ansbach | State Gallery in the Residenz
- Aschaffenburg | State Gallery in the Schloss Johannisburg
- Augsburg | State Gallery in the Katharinenkirche
- Augsburg | State Gallery in the Glaspalast
- Bamberg | State Gallery in the New Residence
- Bayreuth | State Gallery in the New Palace
- Burghausen | State Gallery in the Burghausen Castle
- Füssen | State Gallery in the High Castle
- Neuburg an der Donau | State Gallery in the Castle
- Ottobeuren | State Gallery in the Benedictine-Abbey
- Schleißheim Palace | State Gallery in the New Palace
- Tegernsee | Olaf-Gulbransson-Museum in the Kurpark
- Würzburg | State Gallery in the Würzburg Residence

== Nazi looted art in Bavarian State Collections ==
In 2012, the Bavarian State Paintings Collections announced the restitution of a painting from the workshop of Jan Brueghel the Elder to the heirs of Julius Kien of Vienna. Bavaria had acquired it from the collection of Fritz Thyssen.

In 2013, the Bavarian State Painting Collections agreed to return two watercolours by Max Pechstein to the heirs of Professor Curt Glaser, confirming that the auction of his art collection and library were entirely due to Nazi persecution.

In 2016, the heirs of Alfred Flechtheim, a German-Jewish art dealer and collector, sued the German state of Bavaria, arguing in court papers that it has refused to turn over works of art that the heirs say were looted by the Nazis before World War II.

In June 2016, an investigation by Süddeutsche Zeitung revealed that the Bavarian State Museums had "restituted" looted artworks to the families of high ranking Nazis, which the museum denied in a statement that was criticized as "both inaccurate and misleading".

In 2017, the Bavarian State Painting Collections agreed to return a painting of the Raising of Lazarus to the heirs of James von Bleichröder, represented by Mondex Corporation of Toronto, Canada, confirming that the auction of von Bleichröder's art collection in 1938 was due to Nazi persecution. (footnote to, https://www.pinakothek.de/sites/default/files/downloadable/2020-04/Blog%20Bleichroder_EN_080420.pdf).

In 2018 the museum restituted a painting by Ernst Immanuel Müller to the heirs of Ludwig and Selma Friedmann, who committed suicide just before they were to be deported by the Nazis.

In 2019, one of the paintings that Bavaria had "sold" to the family of Hitler's photographer, Heinrich Hoffmann, was returned to the heirs of its original Jewish owners, Gottlieb and Mathilde Kraus, eight decades after it was confiscated by the Gestapo.

In 2019 three museums in Munich returned nine artworks to the heirs of Julius and Semaya Franziska Davidsohn, who were sent to the Theresienstadt concentration camp, where Julius died in August 1942 and Semaya died a few months later.

In 2021, the Bavarian State Painting Collections returned a medieval work to the heirs of Drey and his business partners, Ludwig and Friedrich Stern.

In 2021, Munich's Neue Pinakothek restituted Fischerboote bei Frauenchiemsee (1884) by the 19th-century Austrian painter Joseph Wopfner to the heirs of Nuremberg toy manufacturer and art collector Abraham Adelsberger.

In 2021, the Bavarian State Paintings Collections refused to allow Germany's national tribunal that reviews claims of art lost in the Nazi era to review the case of Picasso's Madame Soler, which the family of Paul von Mendelssohn-Bartholdy had claimed. "It is simply inexplicable that the state should refuse to use a mediation mechanism it established itself", said Hans-Jürgen Papier, the commission's chairman and a former president of Germany's Federal Constitutional Court.

== See also ==
- Führermuseum
- List of claims for restitution for Nazi-looted art
- Ernst Buchner (curator)
- Maria Almas-Dietrich
- Hildebrand Gurlitt
- Munich Central Collecting Point
