= Esther and Mordecai =

1685 painting by Aert de Gelder

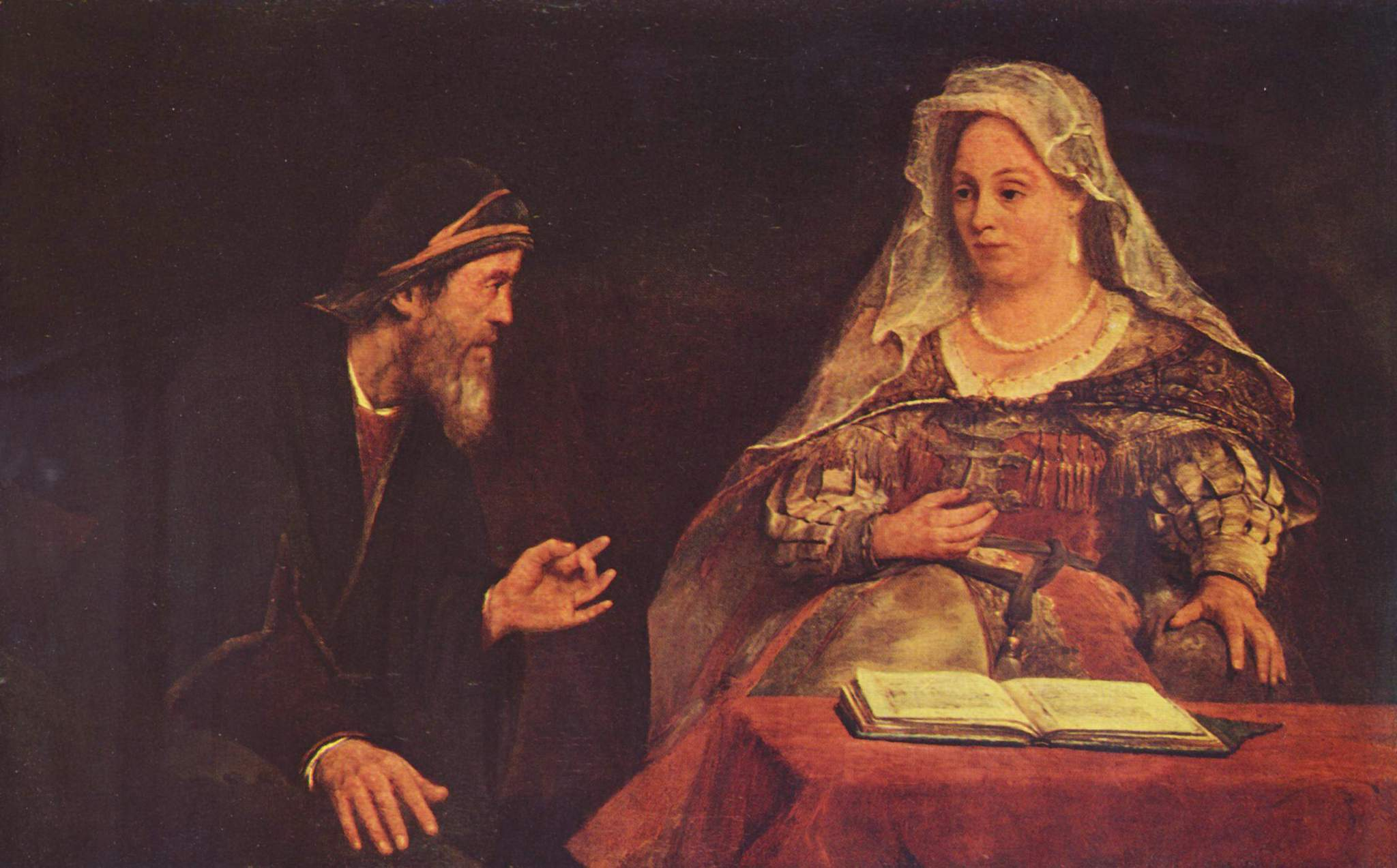
Esther and Mordecai (1685) by Arent de Gelder

Esther and Mordecai is a 1685 oil on panel painting by Arent de Gelder, a pupil of Rembrandt and recognized Dutch painter of the late 17th and early 18th centuries. He was known for his treatment of biblical subjects. This painting is now in the Museum of Fine Arts, in Budapest.
