= Aert de Gelder =

Dutch painter

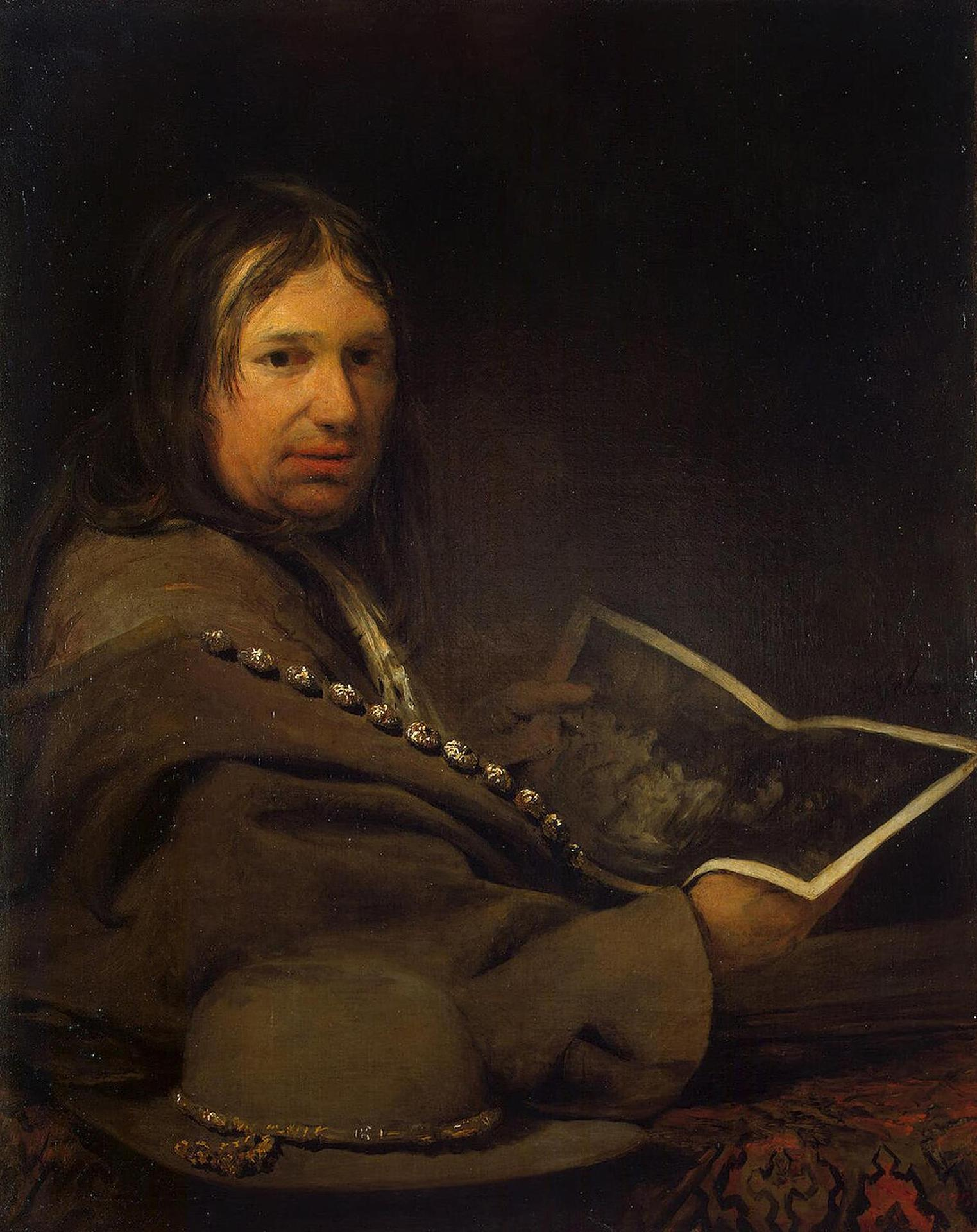
Aert de Gelder - Self-Portrait

Aert de Gelder (Dutch: [ˈaːr(d) də ˈɣɛldər]; October 26, 1645 – August 27, 1727), also known as Arent de Gelder, was a Dutch painter, the only Dutch artist to paint in the tradition of Rembrandt's late style into the 18th century.

== Biography ==
De Gelder was born and died in Dordrecht.

He first studied with Samuel Dirksz van Hoogstraten, one of Rembrandt's pupils and a fellow Dordrecht native, who sent him to his teacher. De Gelder was one of Rembrandt's last pupils, some say his last, studying in his studio in Amsterdam from 1661 to 1663. After Rembrandt's death in 1669, he returned to Dordrecht, where he lived the rest of his life.

He painted mostly biblical works and portraits. His paintings include The Baptism of Christ and Ahimelech Giving the Sword of Goliath to David.

== Works ==
- Esther and Mordecai (Budapest, Museum of Fine Arts)
- Judah and Tamar, c. 1681 (Vienna, Gemäldegalerie of the Academy of Fine Arts)
- King David, c. 1683 (Amsterdam, Rijksmuseum, inv A 2695)
- The Toilet of Esther, c. 1684 (Munich, Alte Pinakothek )
- Portrait of Tsar Peter the Great (Amsterdam, Rijksmuseum?)
- Self Portrait as Zeuxis (Frankfurt am Main, Städel, inv. no. 1015)
- Passion Series c. 1715 (22 paintings, including ten in Aschaffenburg, Schloss Johannisburg, and two in Amsterdam, Rijksmuseum)
- Portrait of Hermannus Boerhaave with his wife and daughter, c. 1724 (Amsterdam, Rijksmuseum, inv A 4034)
- The Marriage Contract, c. 1670 (Brighton Museum & Art Gallery)
- Simeon's song of praise. 1700–1710 (The Hague, Royal Picture Gallery Mauritshuis)
- Baptism of Christ, c. 1710 (Cambridge, Fitzwilliam Museum)
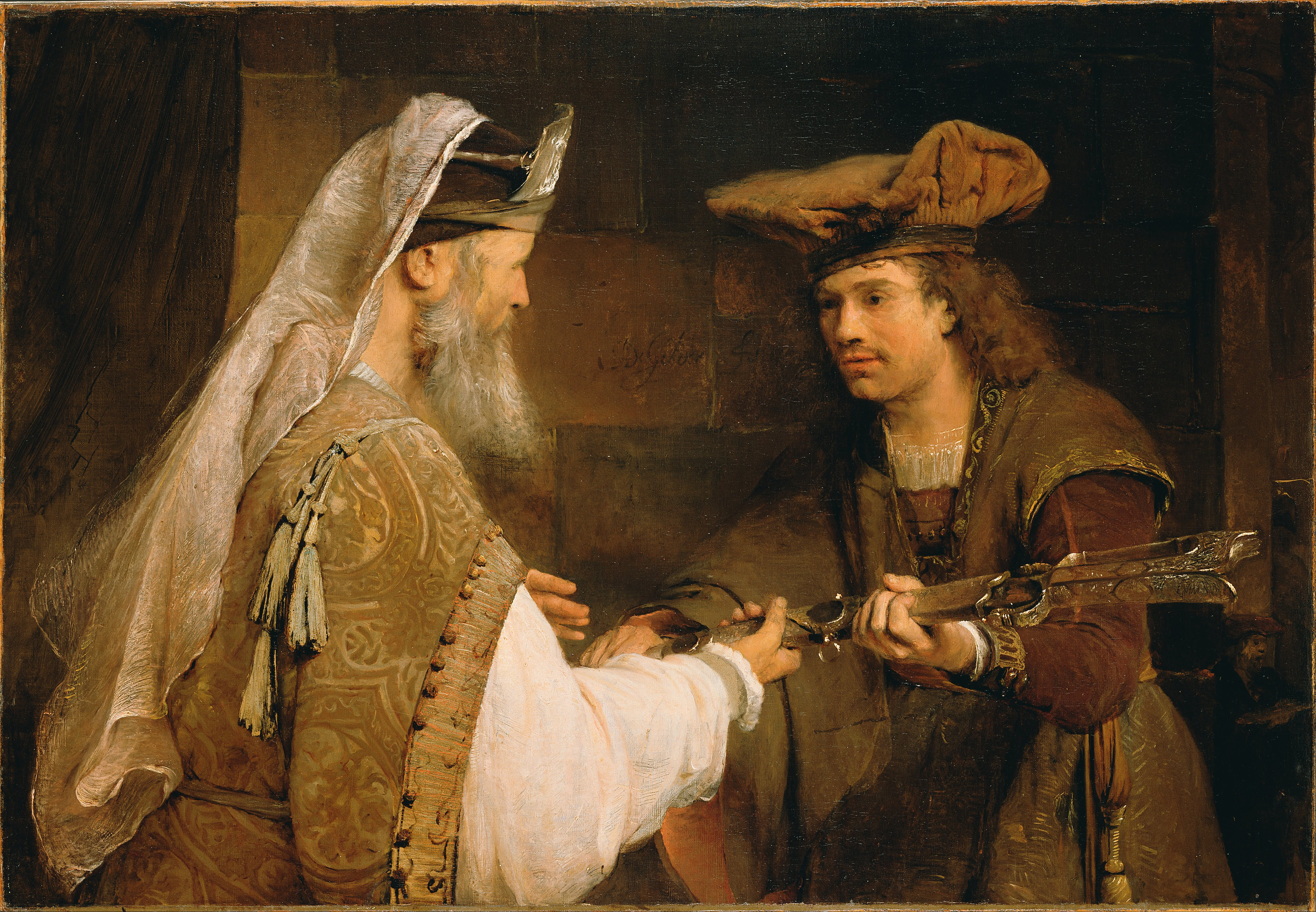
Ahimelech Giving the Sword of Goliath to David

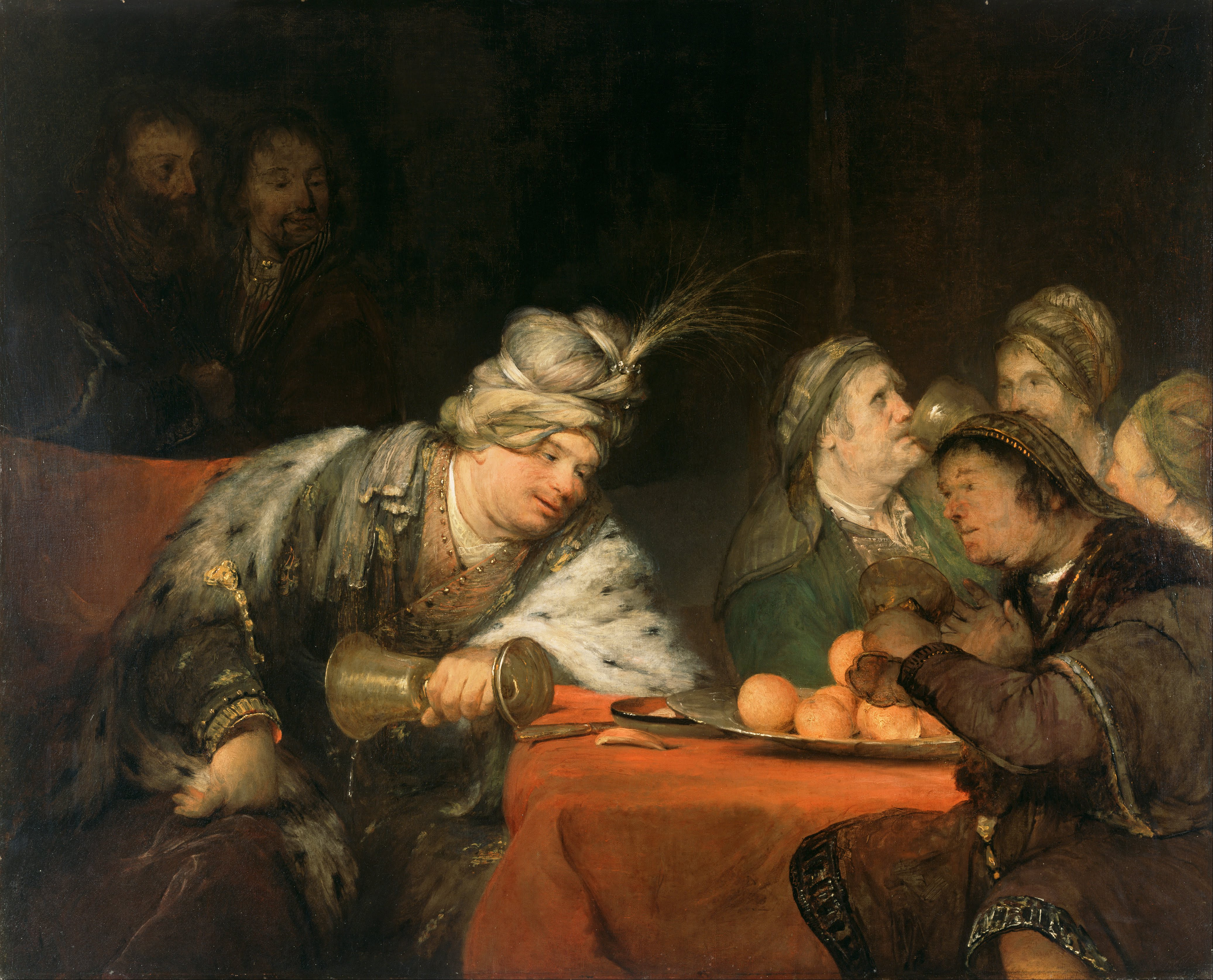
The Banquet of Ahasuerus

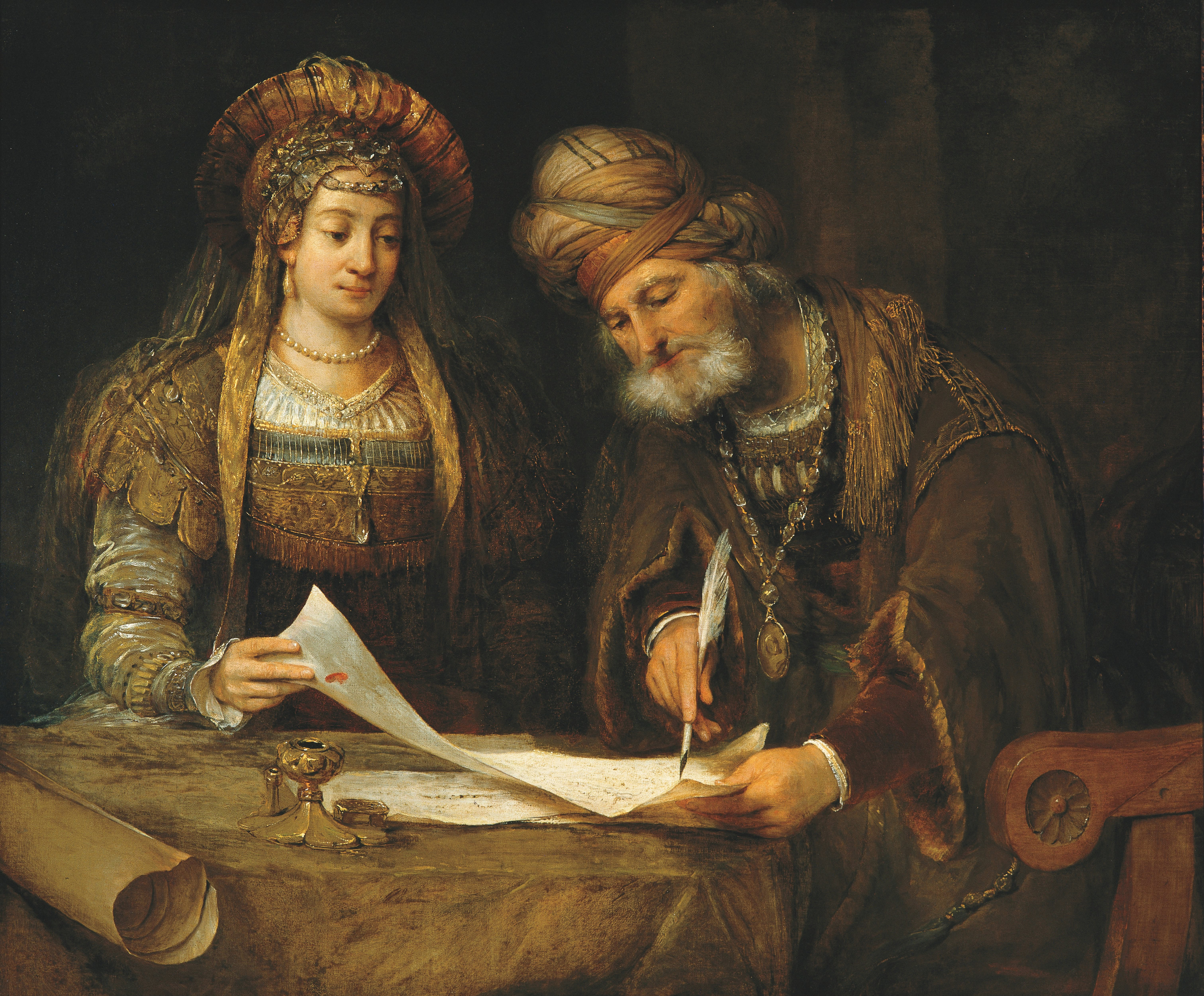
Esther and Mordecai

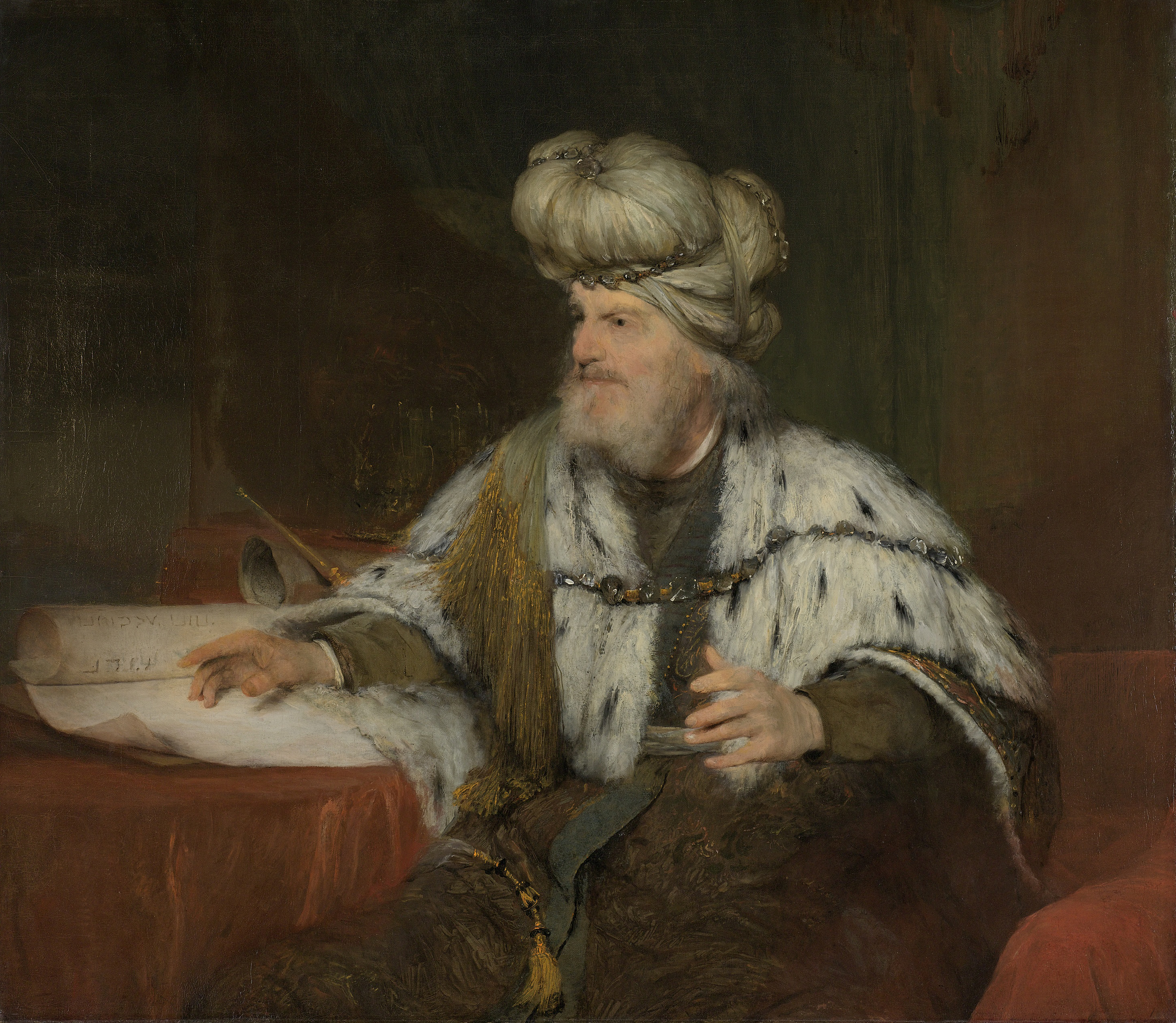
King David

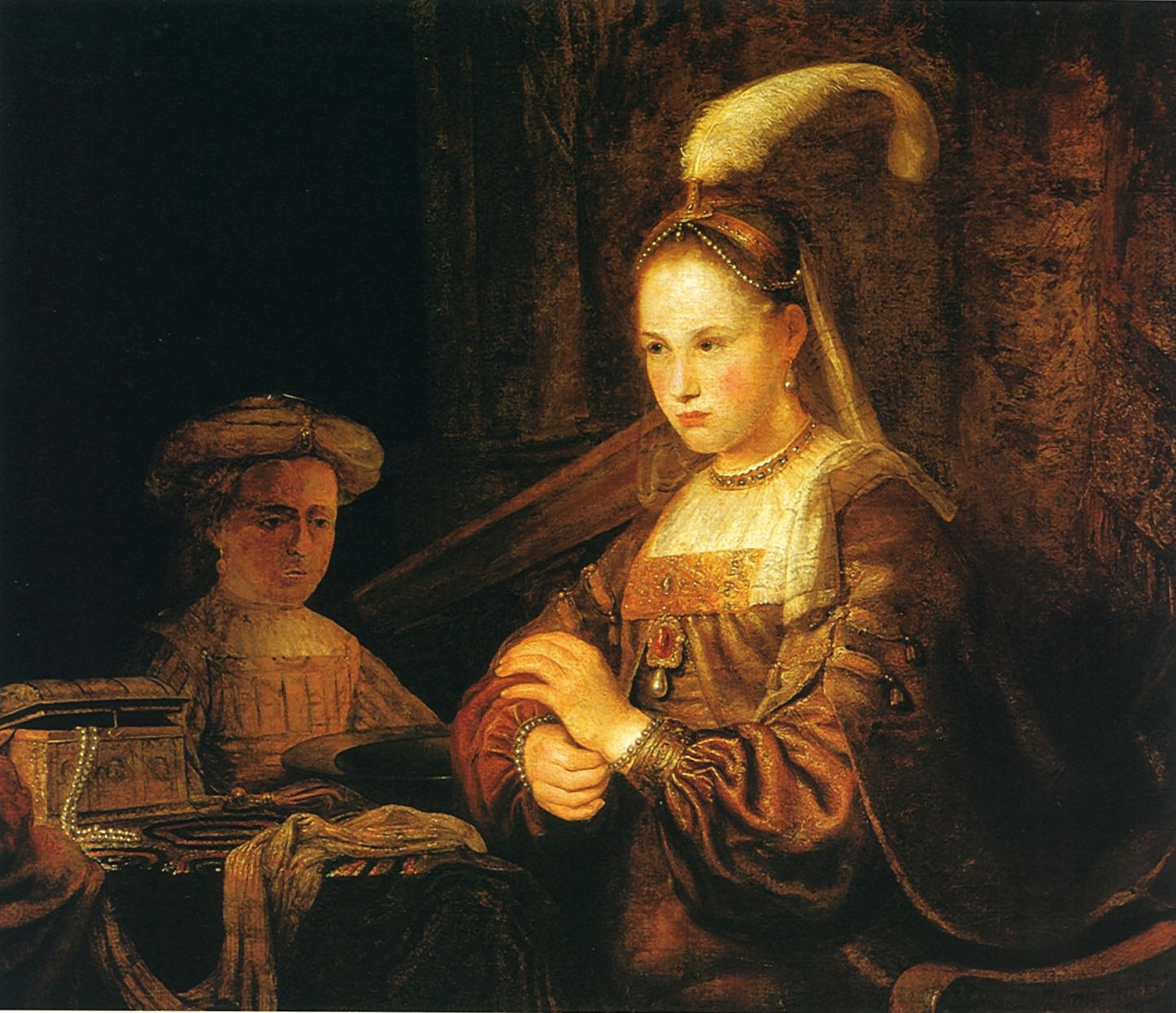
A lady at her toilet

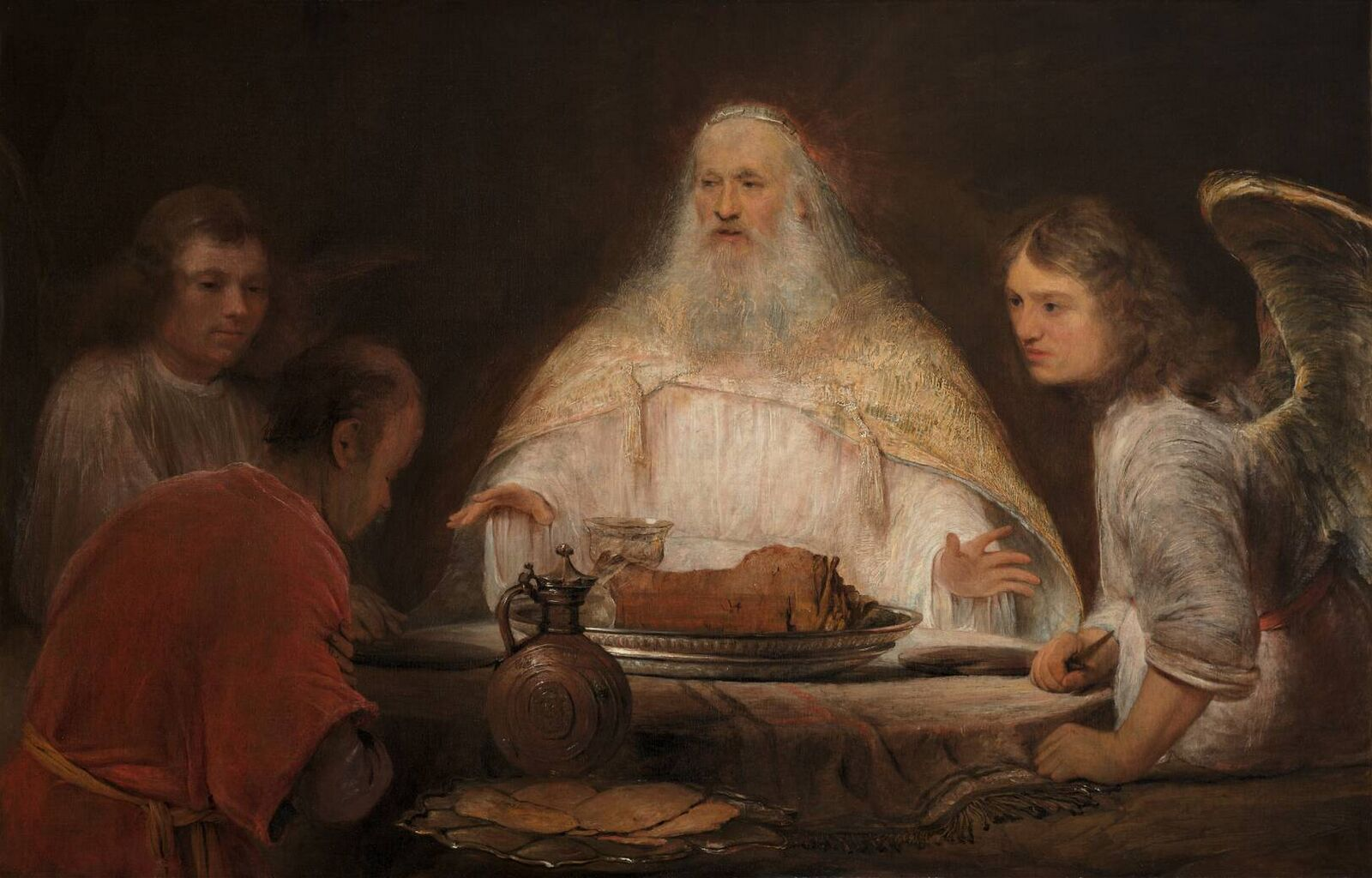
Abraham and the Angels

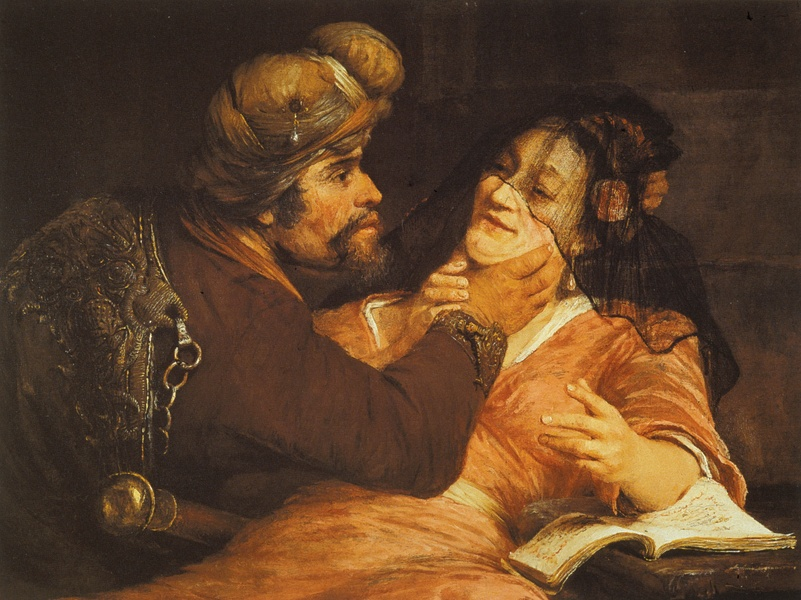
Tamar and Judah

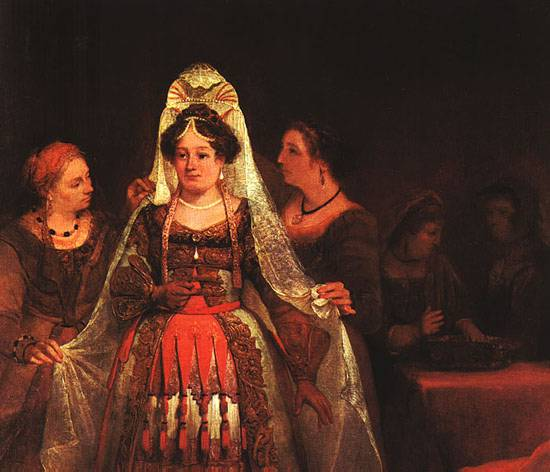
Bride (Esther Bedecked)

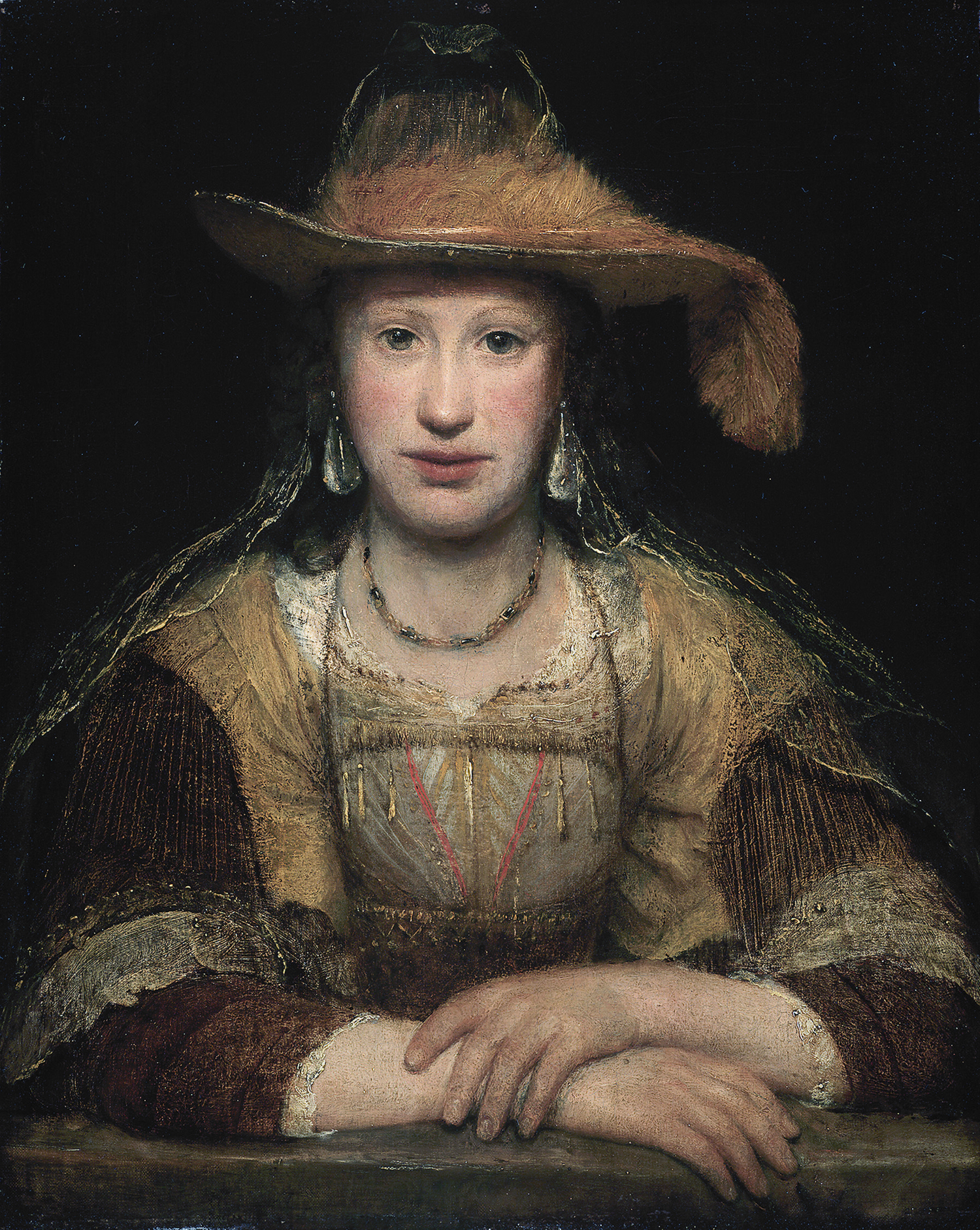
Portrait of an unknown woman (c. 1685)

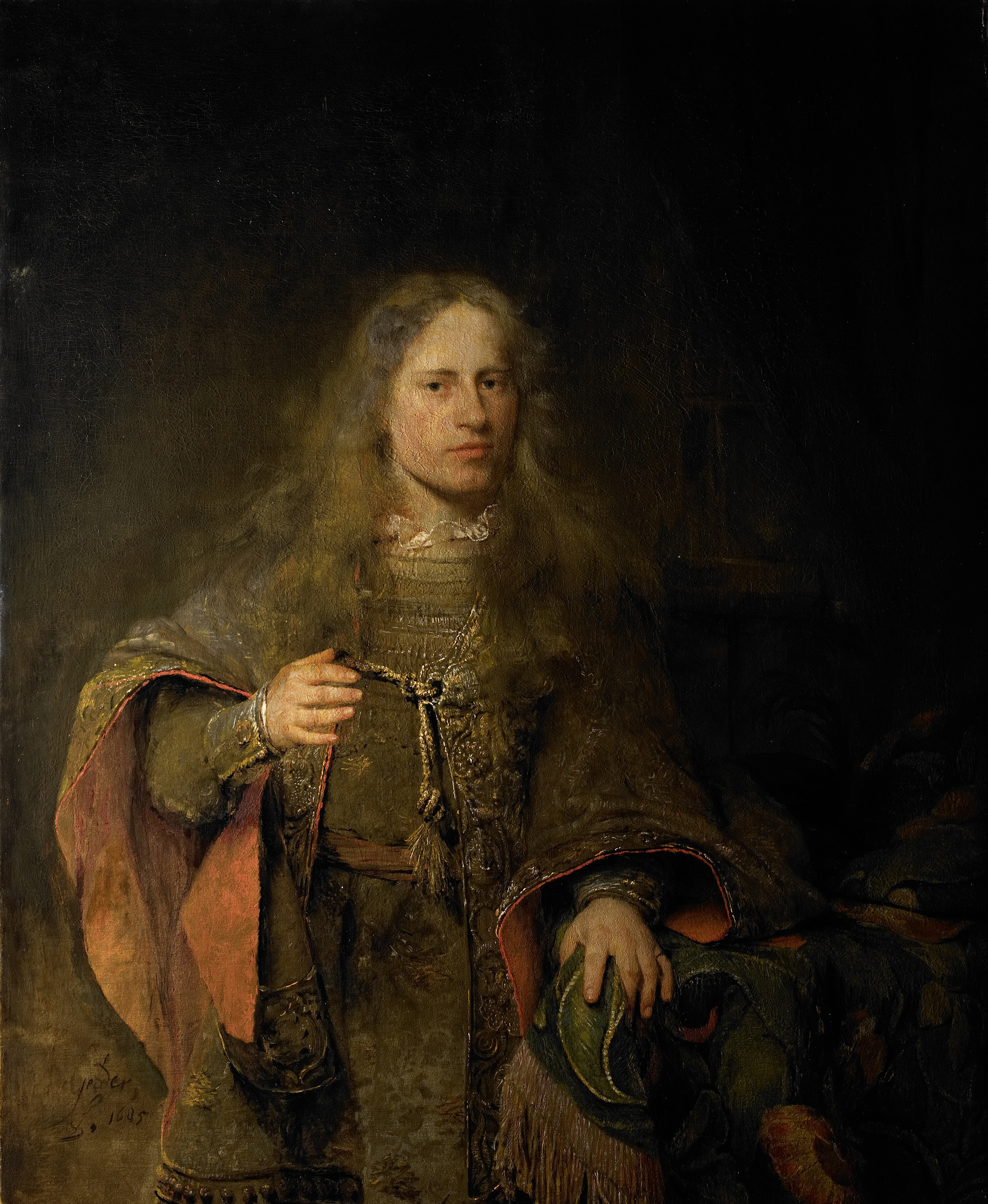
Portrait of Ernst van Beveren (1660–1722)

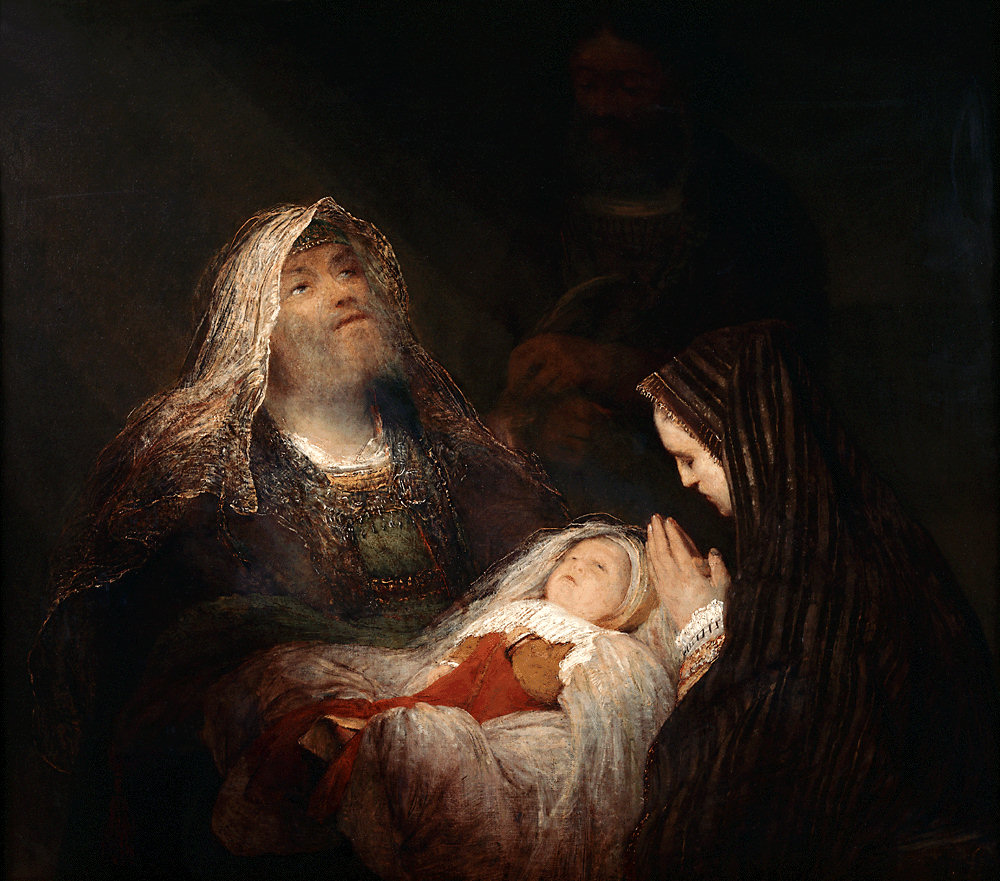
Simeon's Song of Praise (1700–1710)

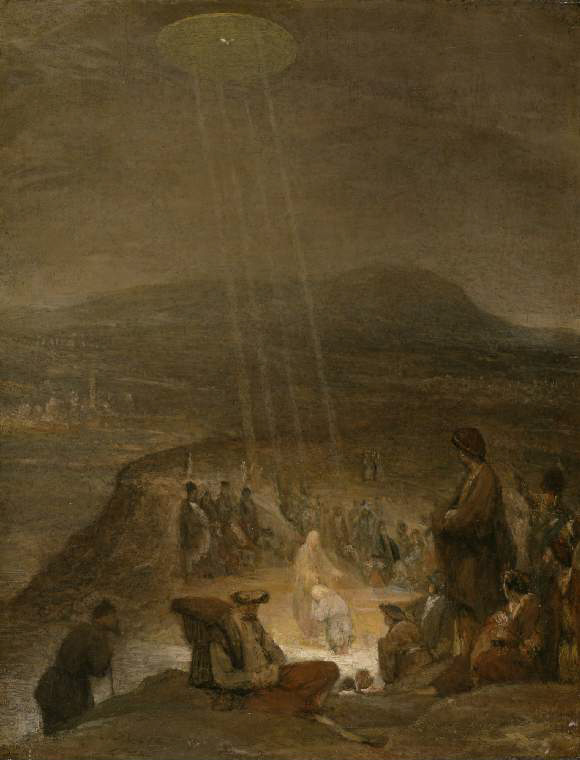
The Baptism of Christ (c. 1710)

== See also ==
- Chiaroscuro
