= St Catharine's Convent, Augsburg =

Former monastery of Dominican nuns in Augsburg, Bavaria, Germany

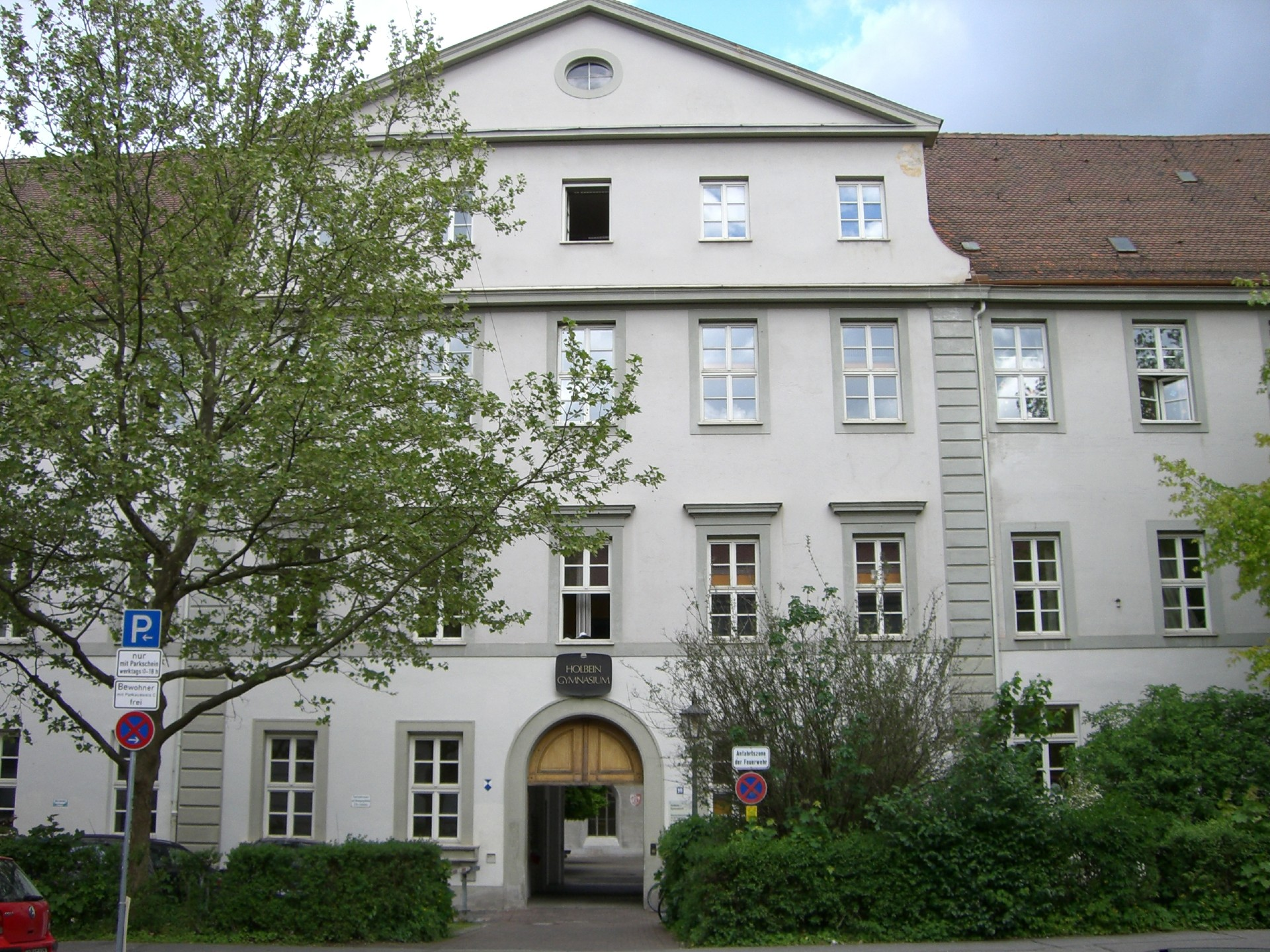
Former monastery buildings

St Catharine's Convent in Augsburg, Germany was a community of Dominican nuns.

It was founded in the Am Gries suburb of the city in 1243 before moving into the city centre eight years later. It was dissolved in 1802, and the nuns vacated the monastery in 1807. In 1834, some of the convent buildings were re-used to house the Königliche Polytechnische Schule and a trade school. In 1835, the former convent church was converted into the Staatsgalerie Altdeutscher Meister, a branch of the Bavarian State Painting Collections, which is still there today. In 1877, the building was taken over by a district primary school, now known as the Holbein-Gymnasium.
