= Lucie Adelsberger =

German internist

Lucie Adelsberger

Lucie Adelsberger (12 April 1895 – 2 November 1971) was a German Jewish physician who was imprisoned during the Second World War at Auschwitz and Ravensbrück concentration camps, where she provided medical care to other prisoners. She specialised in immunology.

== Early life and career ==
Adelsberger was born on 12 April 1895 in Nuremberg. After studying medicine at Erlangen, she began practicing in 1920 and moved to Berlin's Wedding neighbourhood in 1925, where she practiced in internal medicine and paediatrics, specialising in immunology and allergy. In 1927, she joined a serological research group at the Robert Koch Institute, but she was dismissed in 1933 due to the introduction of anti-Semitic laws. She was stripped of her medical license in 1938.

== Concentration camps ==
Adelsberger was sent to Auschwitz concentration camp from Berlin on 17 May 1943. There, she provided medical care in the camp's infirmary, in particular to prisoners suffering from typhus. She also performed many abortions, since pregnancy was forbidden in the camp, and if a baby was born alive it would be killed. Adelsberger collected poison to use for these feticides, and when it ran out some mothers strangled or drowned their newborns. Adelsberger was later transferred to Ravensbrück, and was liberated on 2 May 1945.

== Later life ==
Adelsberger emigrated to the United States in 1946, and resumed practicing medicine in New York, where she eventually died on 2 November 1971. She published a memoir about her time in Auschwitz in 1956; it was translated into English in 1995.

== Literature ==
- Hermann Langbein: Menschen in Auschwitz. Ullstein, Frankfurt am Main, Berlin, Nürnberg 1980, ISBN 3-548-33014-2.
- Eduard Seidler: Jewish Pediatricians: Victims of Persecution 1933–1945, S. Karger Basel New York 2007, ISBN 978-3-8055-8284-1.
- Gedenkbuch Berlins der jüdischen Opfer des Nationalsozialismus, 1995, S. 19.
- Leo Baeck Institute: AR 10089, collection Lucie Adelsberger
- Kurtz, Benjamin: Lucie Adelsberger: Ärztin – Wissenschaftlerin – Chronistin von Auschwitz, Hentrich & Hentrich, Leipzig 2020

== See also ==
- Berta Berkovich Kohut
