= Abraham Adelsberger =

German businessman and art collector

Abraham Adelsberger (23 April 1863 – 24 August 1940) was a German toy factory owner, councillor of commerce and art collector.

== Toy manufacturer ==
Adelsberger was born in Hockenheim and settled in Nuremberg in 1897 with his wife Clothilde née Reichhold (1872-1954), who came from Fürth. The couple had two children, Paul and Sofie. Adelsberger operated a shop until the 1930s. He created one of the first toy factories in the world, "Heinrich Fischer & Cie". The export-oriented company with about 300 employees mainly manufactured movable toys with flywheel or clockwork drive. In 1909, he was admitted to the Nuremberg Masonic Lodge Albrecht Dürer.

== Art collector ==
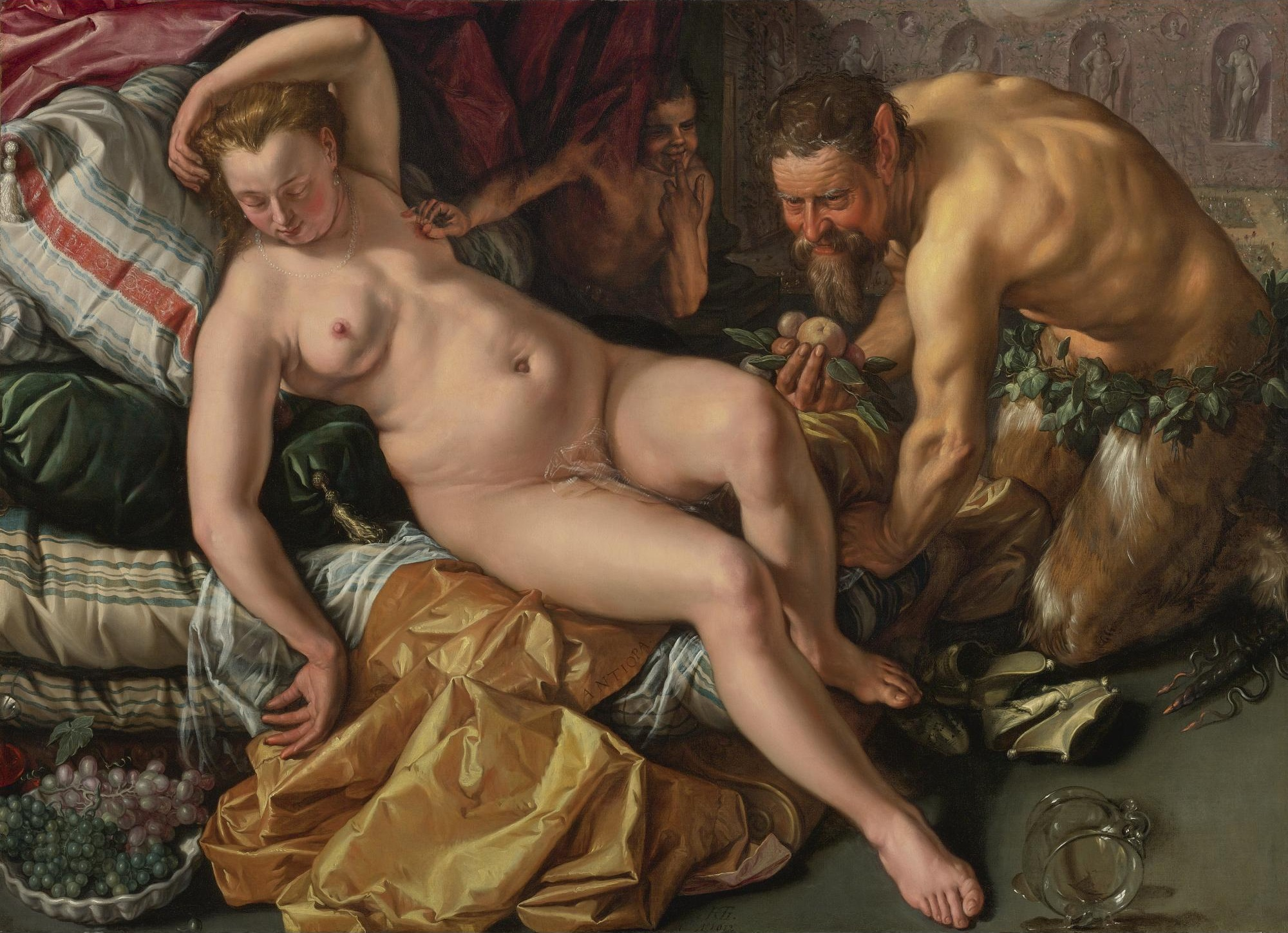
"Jupiter and Antiope" by Hendrick Goltzius

His thriving business enabled Adelsberger to build a villa and to collect art, including porcelain and 19th century works as well as valuable paintings by Peter Paul Rubens, Gustav Schönleber, Georg Jakobides, Carl Spitzweg, Paul Weber. The painting "Jupiter and Antiope" by the Dutch painter Hendrick Goltzius was also in his collection.

== Nazi persecution ==
When the Nazis came to power in Germany in 1933, Adelsbeger and his family were persecuted due to their Jewish heritage.

His son Paul emigrated to America in 1934. His daughter Sofie fled to Amsterdam with her husband, Adelsberger and his wife remained in Nuremberg.

In 1937, Adelsberger had to sell his house and other real estate; his toy factory was Aryanized.

In 1939 they fled to Amsterdam to join their daughter. Adelsberger carried a few works of art with him when he fled, including the painting by Goltzius. In August 1940, Abraham Adelsberger died in Amsterdam. In 1941, Hermann Göring took possession of the painting through a forced sale in order to decorate his country estate Carinhall with it. Adelsberger's wife was deported to the Bergen-Belsen concentration camp in 1943. She survived the Holocaust and applied for reparations after the Second World War, in which her husband's art collection played only a minor role. She did not get back the painting "Jupiter and Antiope"; it remained in the Netherlands. In 2009, it was returned to Adelsberger's heirs by the Dutch government, and in 2010 it was auctioned off by the Sotheby's auction house for $6.8 million.

== Restitution of Nazi-looted art ==
In 2020, the Bayerische Staatsgemäldesammlungen restituted an oil painting by Joseph Wopfner, Fischerboote bei Frauenchiemsee (fig. 1), to the heirs of Adelsberger's son in law, Alfred Isay (1885-1948).

In 2019 the German Lost Art Foundation has approved a new research project at Freie Universität Berlin to research Adelsberger's art collection.

== Literature ==
- Die Geschichte der Adelsbergers. In Frank-Uwe Betz: Verfolgte, Widerständige, Ausgebeutete – über die Nazizeit in der Region Schwetzingen – Hockenheim. HRSG. Arbeitskreis Freundliches Schwetzingen – Verein für regionale Zeitgeschichte e.V. Verlag Regionalkultur, Ubstadt-Weiher 2015, ISBN 978-3-89735-924-6. Text online hier.
- Manfred H. Grieb (Hrsg.): Nürnberger Künstlerlexikon: Bildende Künstler, Kunsthandwerker, Gelehrte, Sammler, Kulturschaffende und Mäzene vom 12. bis zur Mitte des 20. Jahrhunderts. Walter de Gruyter, Berlin 2007, ISBN 978-3-5981176-3-3.

== See also ==
- Aryanization
- List of claims for restitution for Nazi-looted art
- History of Jews in Germany
