= Schloss Johannisburg =

Schloss in Bavaria, Germany

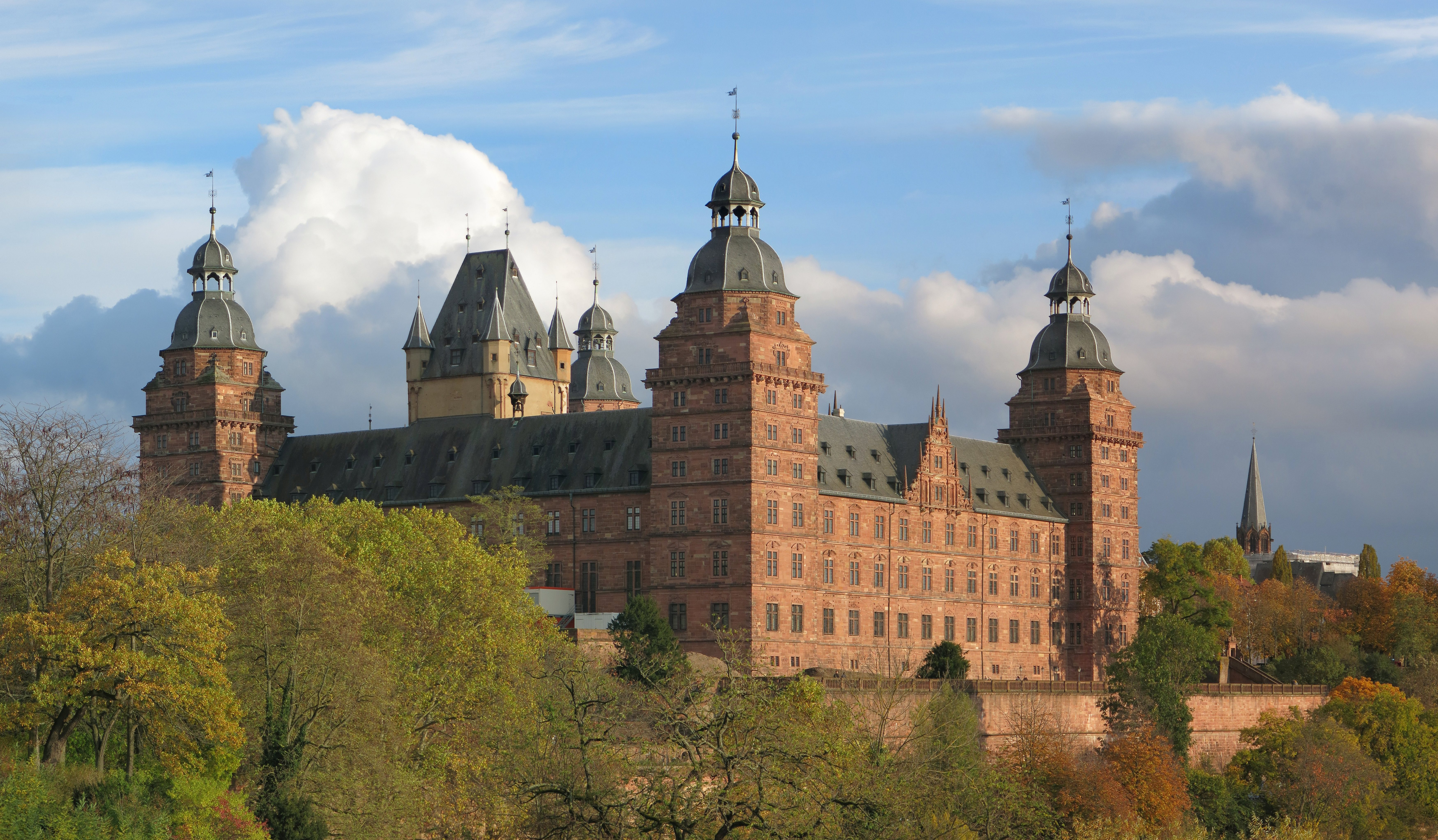
- Schloss Johannisburg in Aschaffenburg
- Interactive map of the Schloss Johannisburg area

General information
- Architectural style: Renaissance
- Location: Aschaffenburg, Germany
- Coordinates: 49°58′34″N 9°8′30″E
- Construction started: 1605
- Completed: 1614
- Inaugurated: 1614
- Client: Johann Schweikhard von Kronberg; Archbishop of Mainz
- Owner: Bayerische Verwaltung der staatlichen Schlösser, Gärten und Seen

Design and construction
- Architect: Georg Ridinger

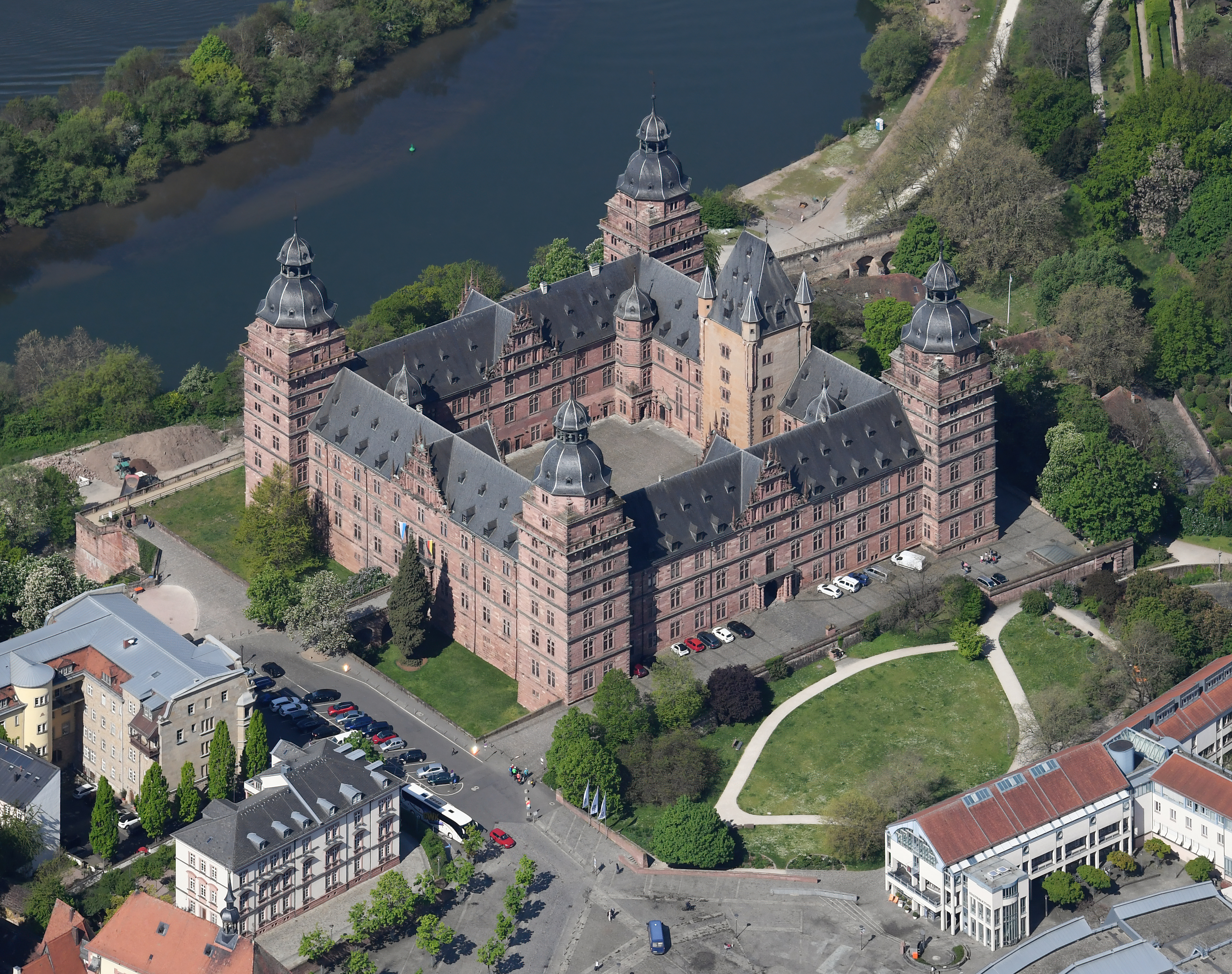
Aerial view from the east

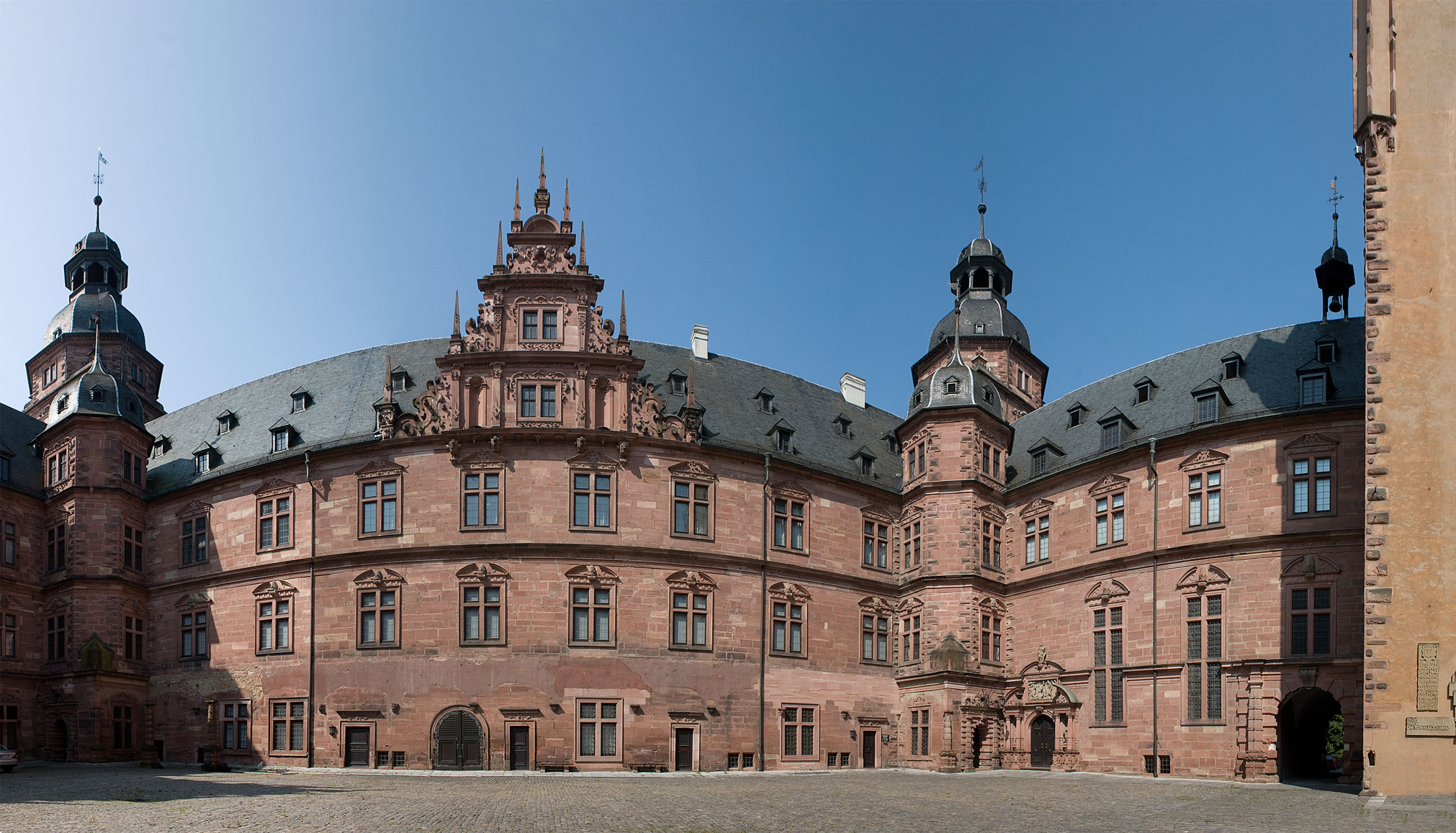
Inner courtyard

Schloss Johannisburg (German pronunciation: [ˈʃlɔs joˈhanɪsbʊʁk]) is a schloss in the town of Aschaffenburg, in Franconia, in the state of Bavaria, Germany. It was erected between 1605 and 1614 by the architect Georg Ridinger for Johann Schweikhard von Kronberg, Prince Bishop of Mainz. Until 1803, it was the second residence of the Archbishop and Prince Elector of Mainz. It is constructed of red sandstone, the typical building material of the Spessart, the hills near Aschaffenburg.

== Location ==
Schloss Johannisburg is located in the city of Aschaffenburg, in the district of Lower Franconia of the state of Bavaria, Germany. It is situated in the center of the city, overlooking the river Main.

== History ==
The palace was erected between 1605 and 1614 by the architect Georg Ridinger for Johann Schweikhard von Kronberg, Archbishop of Mainz. The considerable expense came from the taxes of his fief: Eichsfeld, Erfurt and the Mainzer Oberstift (the part of the Electorate administered from Aschaffenburg) made the largest financial contributions. A keep from the destroyed 14th-century castle that had formerly stood on the site was included in the construction and is the oldest part of the castle. The prior castle had been burned down along with most of the town on 10 August 1552 by the troops of Albert Alcibiades, Margrave of Brandenburg-Kulmbach.

Until the end of the ecclesial principalities in Germany in 1803, Schloss Johannisburg was the second residence of the Prince Bishop of Mainz, the first residence being the Electoral Palace in Mainz. At the end of the 18th century, the interior had been restructured in the style of Classicism (or Neoclassicism) by Emanuel Herigoyen.

Karl Theodor von Dahlberg, Archbishop of Mainz in 1803, retained the territory of Aschaffenburg — turned into the newly created Principality of Aschaffenburg — and was awarded other territories in compensation for territories west of the Rhine, including Mainz, which were annexed by France. From 1810 to 1813, Aschaffenburg was part of the Grand Duchy of Frankfurt. Aschaffenburg and Schloss Johannisburg then passed to the Kingdom of Bavaria.

During the reign of Ludwig I, Schloss Johannisburg served as the summer residence of the King, who referred to Aschaffenburg as his "Bavarian Nice". He commissioned the construction of a Roman villa known as Pompejanum within sight of the palace.

The palace was nearly destroyed by US artillery in the closing days of World War II. Rebuilding started in 1951 and took more than twenty years.

== Description ==
Schloss Johannisburg is one of the few mostly symmetrical palace buildings of the German Renaissance. The castle sits on a terrace overlooking the river, which Ridinger expanded in area and height, elevating the castle above even the highest flood lines. Four wings surround an almost square interior court. The buildings have three floors each with the exterior structured only by fascia and a central three-tiered transverse gable in each roof. A tower is located on each the four corners, extending outward beyond the building line. From a square foundation the towers turn octagonal from the seventh floor upwards. The towers are topped by slate roofs with roof lanterns. The symmetry of the structure is only broken by the old keep which extends into the courtyard from the north wing. It is crowned by a steep roof with four small decorative towerlets at the corners. This roof design was in contrast to Ridinger's plans, who had intended the central keep to mirror the appearance of the castle's corner towers.

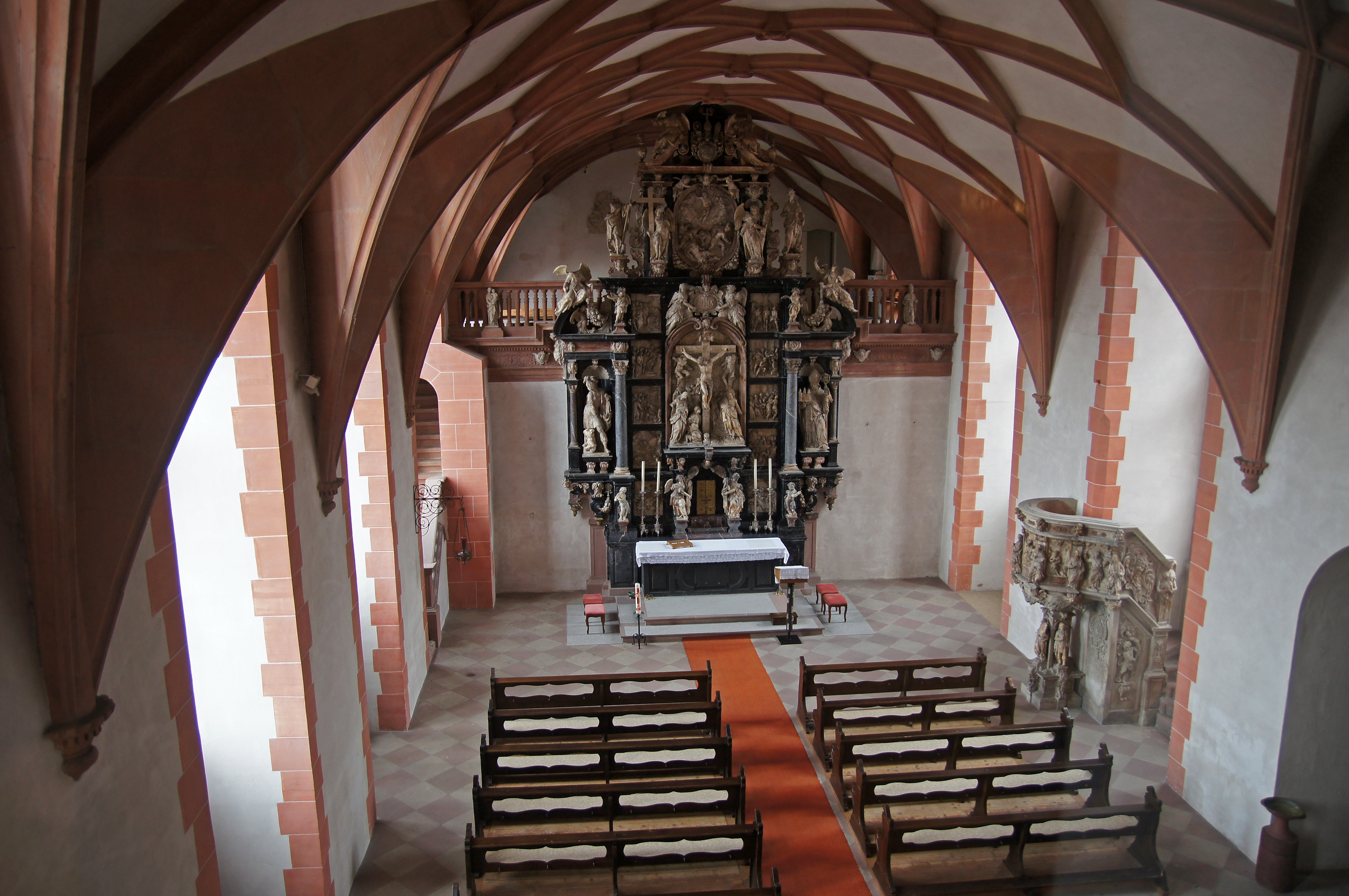
Chapel with rib vault inspired by Gothic architecture

Small round stairway towers are located in the four corners of the court. The Schlosskirche or chapel is in the north wing. It extends through the ground and upper floor, with a rib vault referencing Gothic style. The chapel's altar, made from alabaster and marble, is by Hans Juncker. It features a statue of Johann Schweikhard von Kronberg, holding a model of the castle.

The castle is built from Buntsandstein, notably from the quarries of Obernburg and Miltenberg. Although the exterior walls are largely devoid of ornamentation, numerous artistic carvings were added to the gables and the gateways.

== Today ==
The castle is one of the main attractions of Aschaffenburg and its landmark. Schloss Johannisburg is one of the most important buildings of the Renaissance period in Germany.

Schloss Johannisburg is open to the public and hosts several museums: Staatsgalerie Aschaffenburg, a gallery of paintings (with works by Lucas Cranach the Elder), the Paramentenkammer of the palace chapel (with vestments from the former treasury of Mainz Cathedral), the residential rooms (furnished in Neoclassical style) and the Municipal Palace Museum (arts and handicraft). There is also the world's largest collection of architectural models made from cork, built by court confectioner Carl May and his son after 1792.
