= Roman cryptoporticus, Vicenza =

1st-century BC architectural structure

Roman Cryptoporticus (Vicenza)
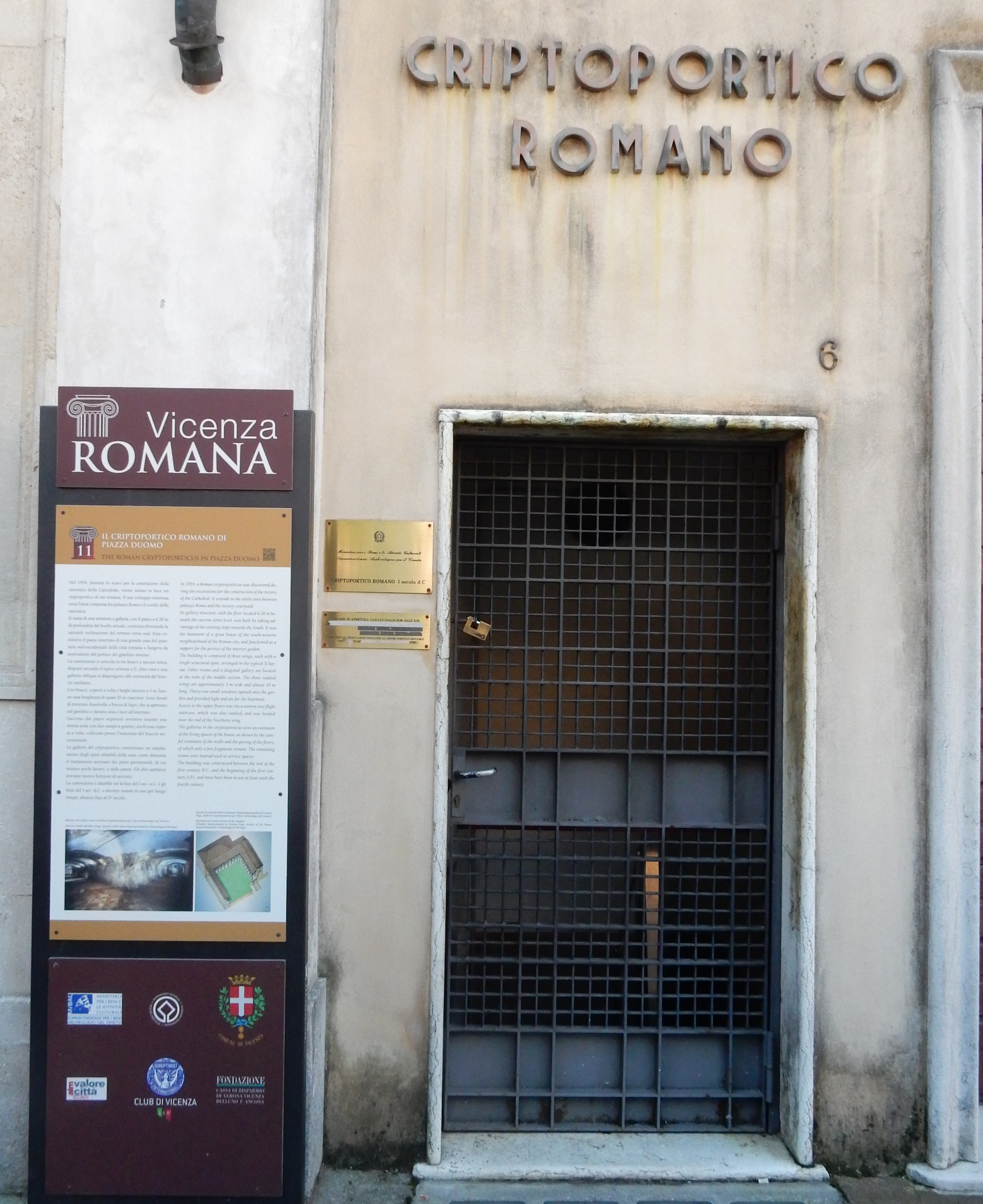
- The entrance to the crypoporticus.
- Interactive map of Roman Cryptoporticus (Vicenza)
- 45°32′44.25″N 11°32′39.08″E
- Type: Cryptoporticus
- Cultures: Roman
- Location: Italy, Vicenza

History
- Built: 1st century BC
- Abandoned: 4th century AD

Site notes
- Discovered: 1954
- Owner: Diocese of Vicenza
- Management: Superintendence of archaeology, fine arts and landscape for the provinces of Verona, Rovigo and Vicenza
- Public access: yes

The Roman cryptoporticus of Vicenza is a cryptoporticus from ancient Vicetia (today Vicenza), dating back to the end of the 1st century BC. The cryptoporticus, perfectly preserved, is accessed through the entrance located in the current Piazza Duomo and it extends under the rectory of the cathedral and Palazzo Roma.

The cryptoporticus was used at least until the 4th century A.D., first as a place to cool off, then as a food pantry.

It is the best preserved example of a Roman cryptoporticus of private dwelling in the north of the Po.

== Description ==
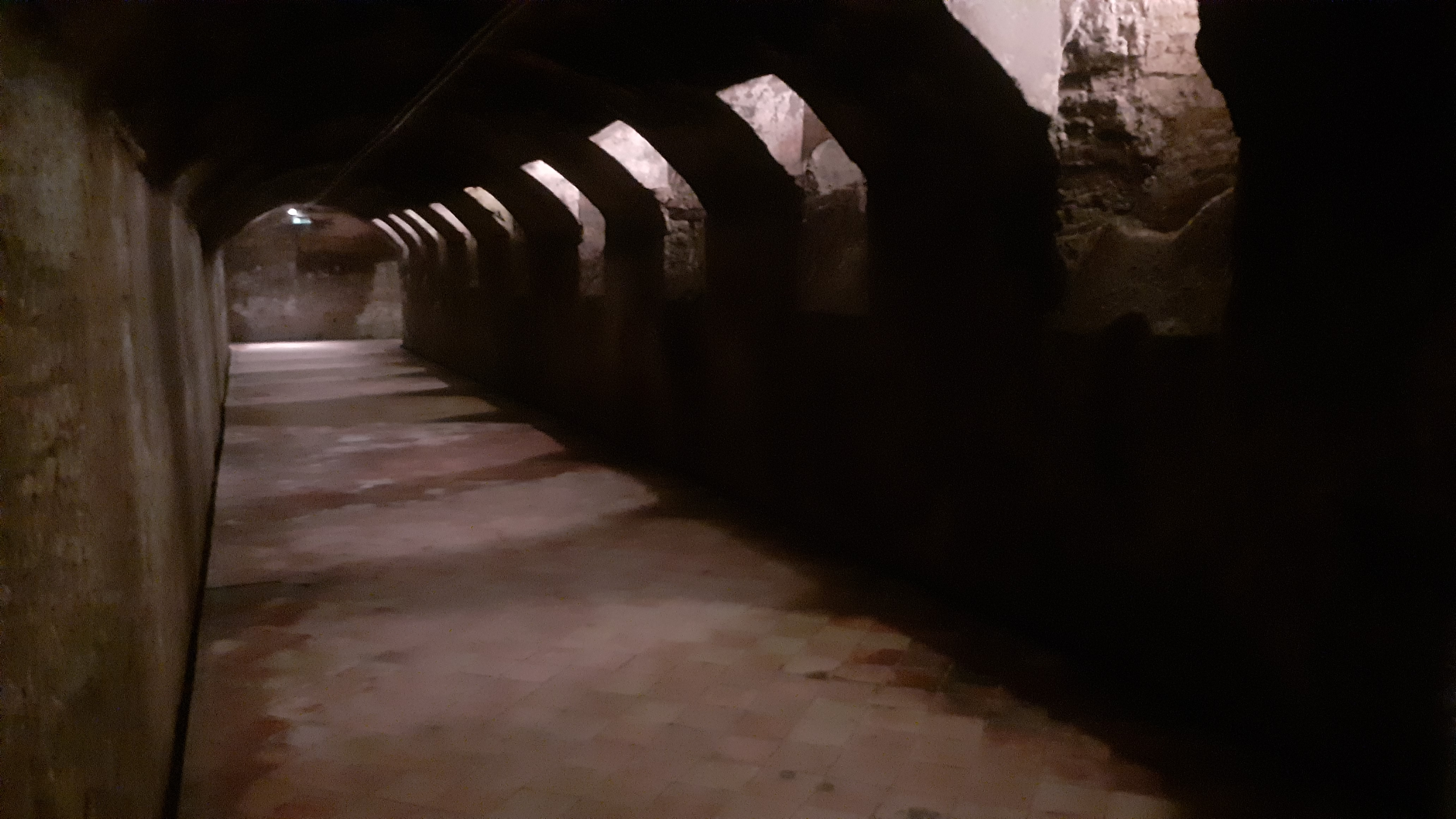
One of the branches of the cryptoporticus

The cryptoporticus belonged to a Roman domus, not preserved (but certainly rich, given the size of the cryptoporticus), located in the southwestern area of the Roman city. It consists of three corridors arranged in a U-shape. The base floor is located at a depth of 6.31 m compared to the current floor of the square. The central branch, the one facing west and the longest, measures 29.5 m in length and 3.28 m in width, while the adjacent rooms both measure 27.35 m in length and 2.98 m in width. The branches have a single nave and are covered with a barrel vault made of opus caementicium. The cryptoporticus is about 2.75 m high and the thickness of the vault and walls is of about 1 m.

The cryptoporticus received light from 31 small windows open to the street, located in the upper part of the inner sides, most likely corresponding with the garden of the peristyle above. It could be accessed via a narrow staircase, partly corresponding to the one still in use, which led into the northern branch. The last four stone steps are original; as for the others, the brick structure has been reconstructed using the slope indicated by the background of the fresco located on the wall to the left side of who descends.

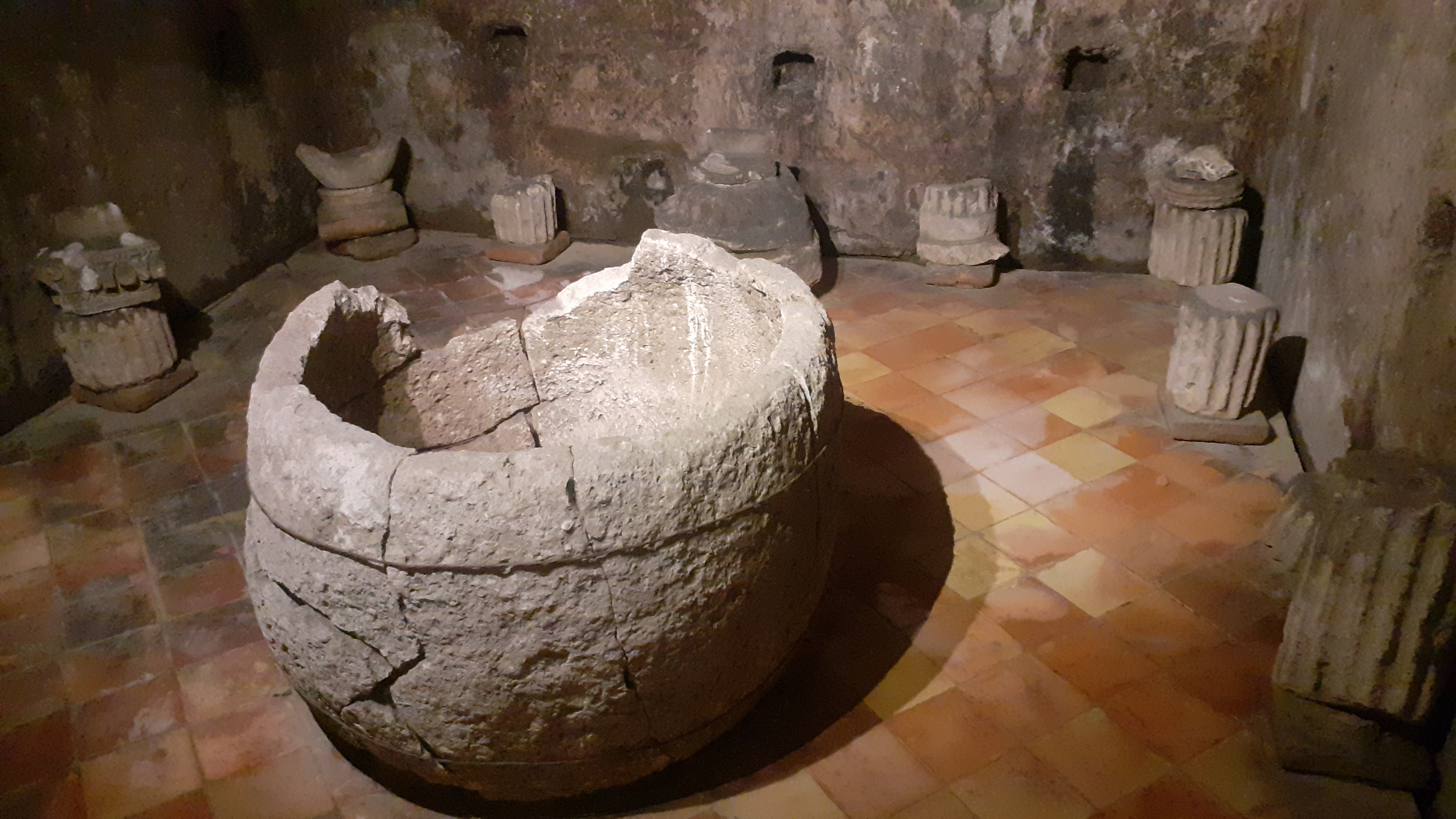
The compartment used as a warehouse

At the two ends of the central branch there are two compartments in a symmetrical position, which had different functions. The northern one, usually called compartment A, had to be used for the storage of materials; in fact, on the three walls there is a double row of recessed holes for the placement of beams intended to support wooden shelves that ran across the room. Access to this area is limited by a stone entrance threshold about half a meter high, probably to work as flood protection. In the same threshold and in the upper architrave some chamfers for the closing door were made, that thus was used to seal the environment. All these precautions indicate that this compartment was intended to accommodate materials or objects that had to be absolutely protected from water. Considering the size of the holes in the walls, the beams that had to be embedded in them had to be very sturdy, therefore intended to support rather big weights, but made from not very bulky materials, as the distance between the two rows of holes is about half a metre. This room contains fragments of columns and a stone pool for water, dating back to the late ancient period, after the end of the Roman Empire.

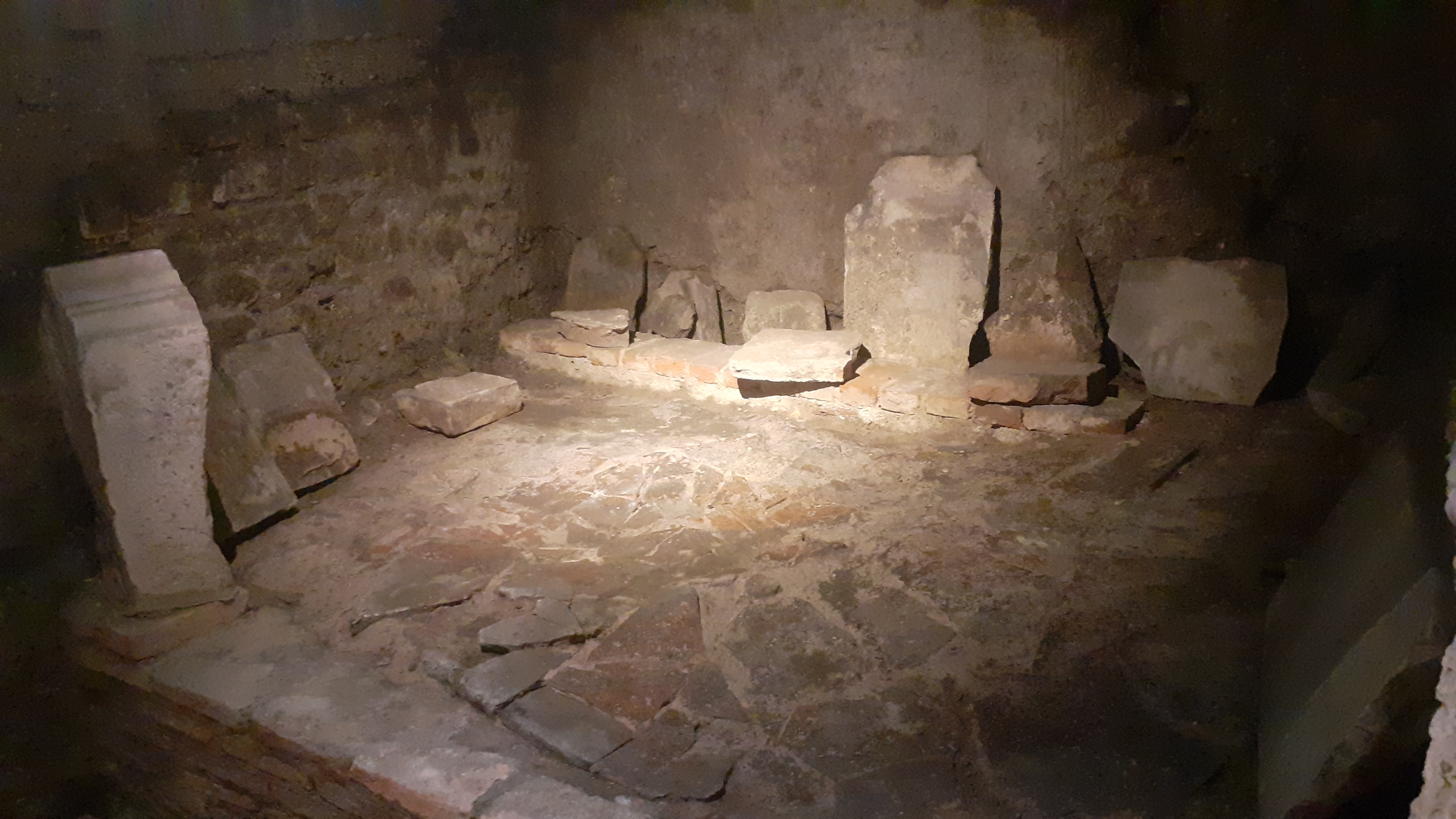
The southern compartment

The southern compartment B is accessed through a low threshold, therefore only intended to isolate the environment from any rain that could wet the floor of the corridor. In this room there are no holes on the walls that indicate the presence of shelves. From here you can access a second room C open to a 1.8 m wide ramp, only partially investigated. In these two rooms two plaster remains of the pavements found during the excavation works were placed.

The original flooring consisted of a mosaic of roman hexagonal bricks, alternated with rhomboidal components. The thickness, the uneven finish and the differences between the various pieces indicate that the hexagons were handmade from the brick mould before the baking. A white stone tile was placed in a small incision in the middle of each hexagon. The original flooring was then covered with a mosaic of white tiles alternated with sparse black tiles. This second floor was laid on top of the previous one, raising the height of the walkway (the first laying was -2.75 m from the intrados of the vault, the second at -2.70 m). In one of the compartments there is part of a third floor in a raised position, located at an altitude of -2.30 m from the intrados, and consisting of larger sesquipedal bricks of a foot and a half length, that is, approximately half a meter. The use of this structure, which has been assumed to be used as workshop or laboratory, is unclear.

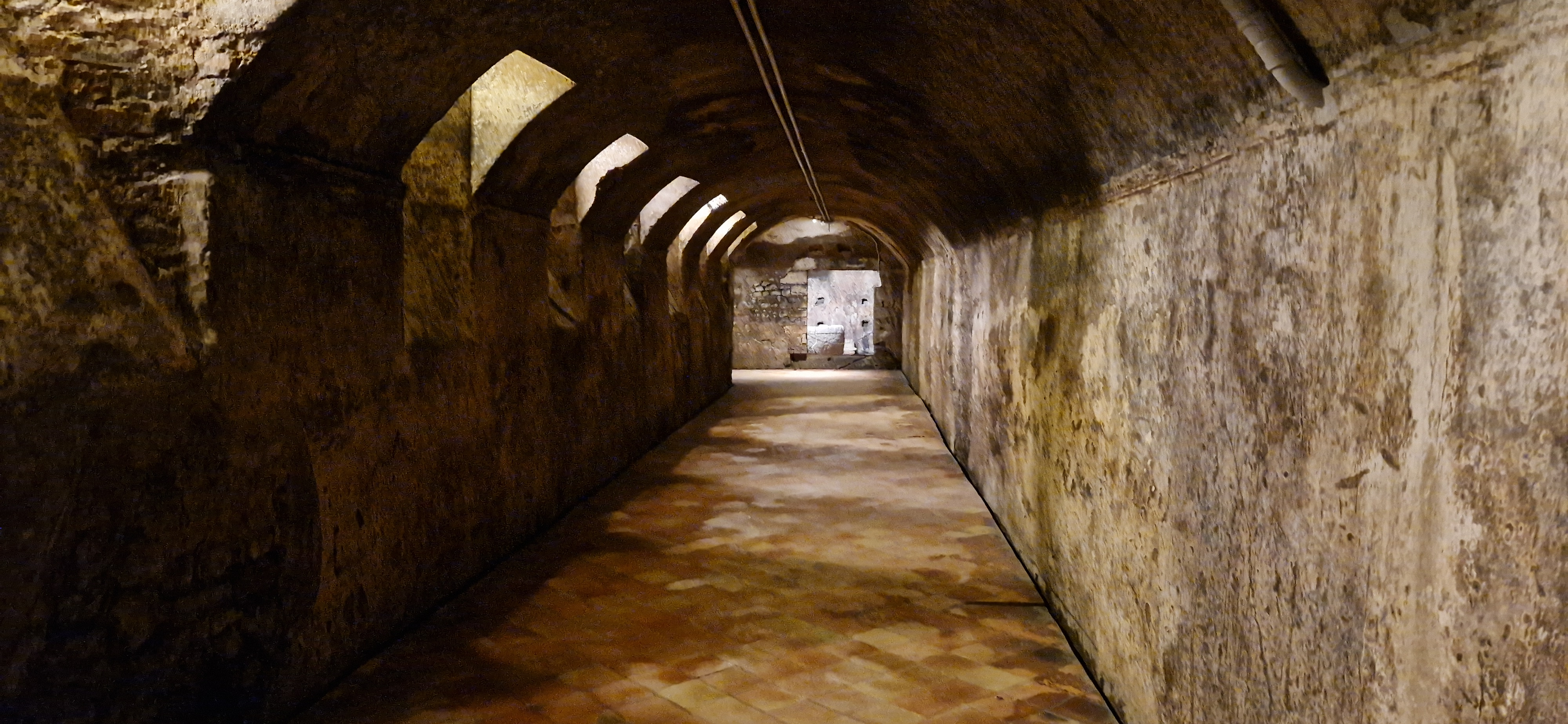
View of one of the branches of the cryptoporticus

The current flooring is modern and is located 0.15 m above the old flooring. The elevation is due to the need to provide a drain for rainwater infiltration on the side, since the floor is about 6 meters below the current road level and is also located below the city's water table, with consequent problems of percolation in case of violent storms. The choice of tiles was made in order to reproduce the appearance of the original flooring,

The walls have a light marmorino plastering superimposed on a layer of coarser plaster. At the top, at the edge of the intrados of the vault, the plaster is delimited by a band in Pompeian red about three fingers wide, to which is superimposed a stucco cornet in the shape of an inverted staircase with three protruding steps. This clearly indicates that it was a very well-kept environment and that it was used by the family for household activities. The use of the cryptoporticus, therefore, at least for part of its life, was not limited to a storage room.

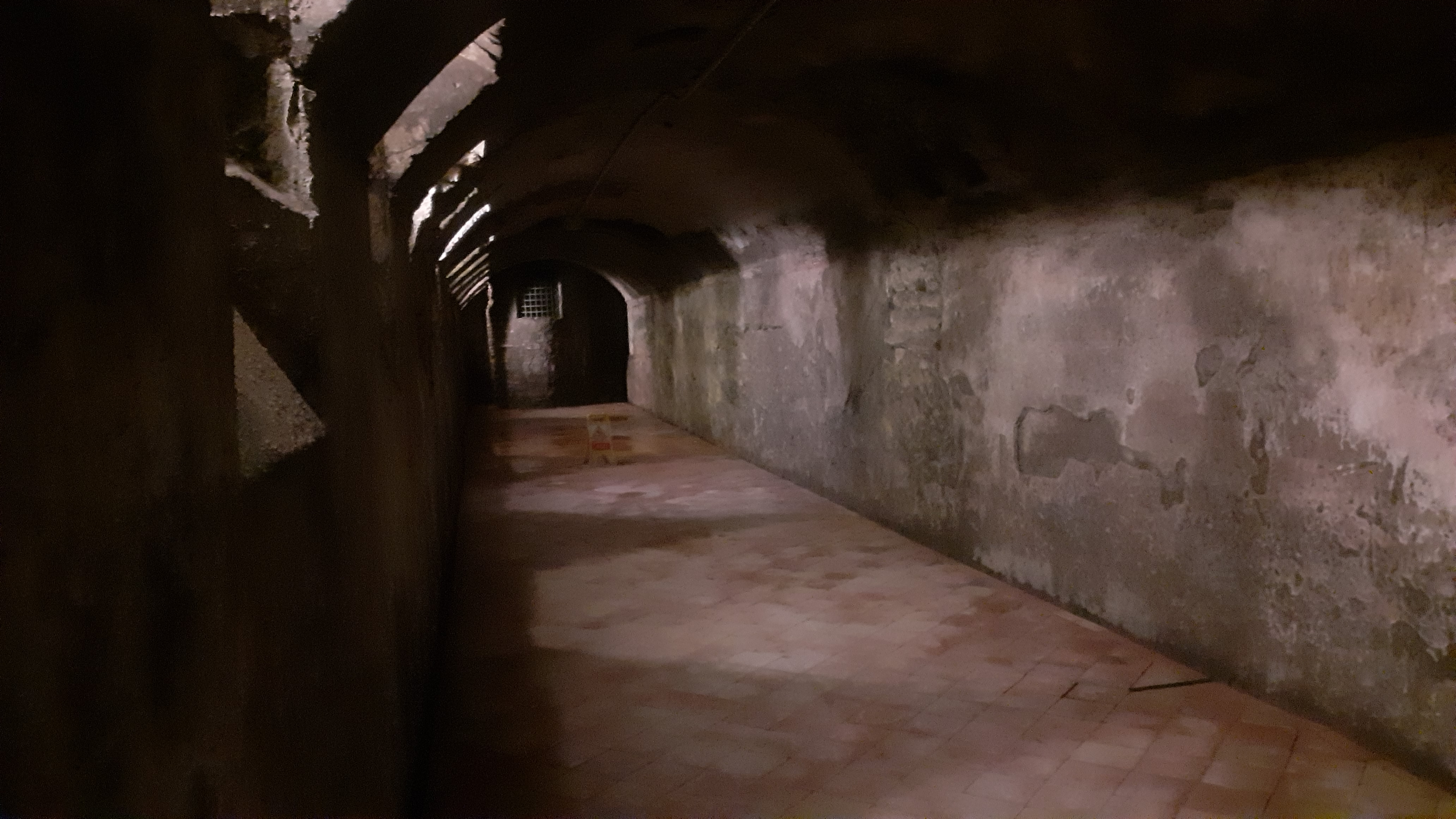
Southern arm, at the bottom you can see the shaft of the well, probably medieval.

In the most frequent examples of Roman cryptoporticus present in southern Italy, where the climate is definitely warmer, these spaces offered refreshment in summer as environments with a more pleasant temperature. In the case of Vicenza, the problem of summer heat was less pressing, but on the other hand this space could offer shelter also during the winter, when the temperature inside was milder than those of the unheated rooms of the domus on the upper floor.

At the end of the southern branch there is the barrel of a brick well, certainly not part of the original Roman structure and of probable medieval origin, which flows into the courtyard of the above Palazzo Roma. The well was probably built to draw the water of the environment below. During the restoration works following the discovery of 1954, an opening was made in the wall of the well, providing it with a protective grate. With this measure, an air flow has been established, that is then channeled towards the gate at the entrance, thus favoring the ventilation of the underground environment and helping to reduce the formation of mold.

== Discovery ==
The cryptoporticus was discovered at the beginning of summer of 1954 during the construction of the rectory of the cathedral of Vicenza along the southern side of Piazza Duomo.

To build the cellars of the rectory, the works involved an excavation to a depth of up to 3.20 m. However, once the workers reached 3 meters, they came across a compact structure much harder than the surrounding earth and gravel, probably a floor fragment. When delimiting the structure, it was noticed that below it appeared to be empty. With the help of a flashlight what looked like a gutter appeared, shallow and not very long. The cleaning and consolidation work that were immediately scheduled, instead, revealed that it was a much more complex structure.

The experts of the Archaeological Superintendence, who were prmptly consulted, hypotesized that it could be a cryptoporticus from the Roman era. The cleaning, restoration, lighting and safety works that lasted for three years were therefore commissioned. In 1957, after laying the tiled floor, the cryptoporticus was finally opened to the public.

== Findings ==
The findings of the 1954 excavation are preserved in the Natural Archaeological Museum of Santa Corona. In particular were found terracotta antefixes, jars, lamps, an elliptical brick with a T. Delli Sereni stamp, a bronze wall lamp depicting a marine deity, and marble elements including those of a table. In the garden of the nearby bishop's palace, an Ionic capital was found, probably related to the peristyle above the cryptoporticus.

== See also ==
- Marmorino – Type of plaster or stucco
- Pompeian red – Reddish pigment

== Bibliography ==
- Forlati Tamaro, Bruna (1958). Il criptoportico di Vicenza. Vol. Studi in onore di Federico M. Mistrorigo. Vicenza.
- L'Italia - 11. Veneto. Vol. Touring Club Italiano - La biblioteca di Repubblica. Milan: Touring Editore. 2005. p. 313.
- Gullino, Giuseppe (2014). Storia di Vicenza dalla Preistoria all'Età Contemporanea. Verona: Cierre edizioni. pp. 48–49. ISBN 978-88-8314-759-3.
- Mattiello, Franco (2012). Vicenza Romana. Padova: Edizioni Messaggero. pp. 76–86. ISBN 978-88-250-3065-5.
