= The Two Foscari (painting) =

1855 painting by Eugène Delacroix

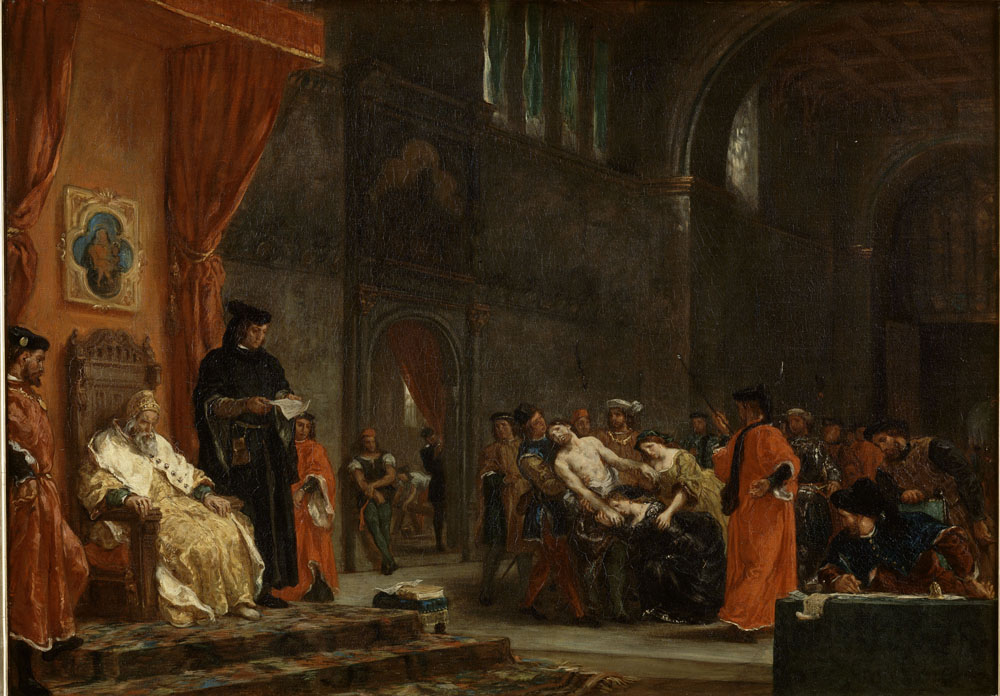
The Two Foscari (1855) by Eugène Delacroix. Oil on canvas. Musée Condé in Chantilly, France. Inventory Number: PE 456.

The Two Foscari (in French - Les deux Foscari) is an oil on canvas painting by the French Romantic artist Eugène Delacroix, executed in 1855, now in the Musée Condé in Chantilly, France.
