= Cryptoporticus =

Covered corrdior in ancient Roman architecture

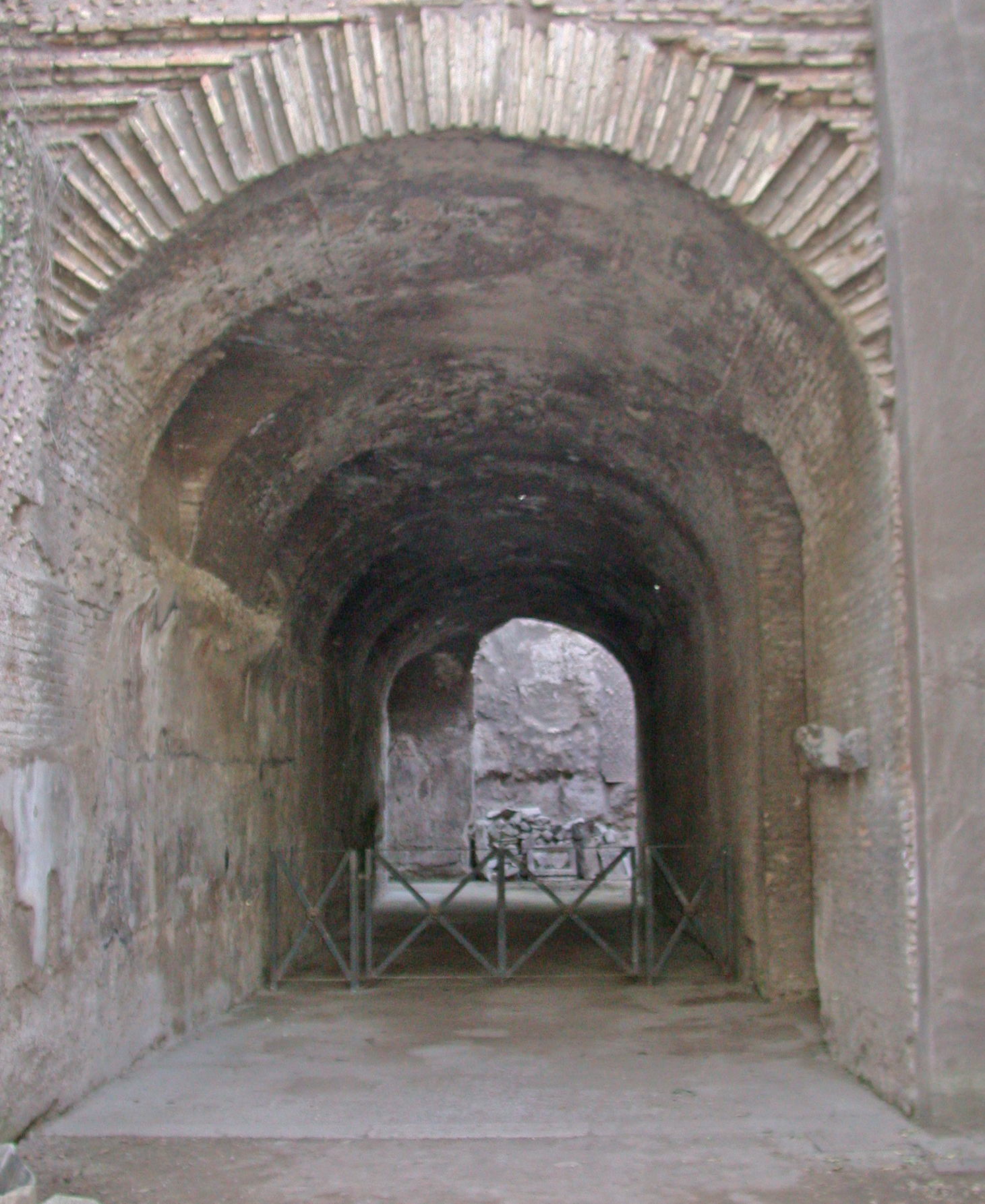
Cryptoporticus of Emperor Nero at Domus Transitoria, Palatine Hill

In Ancient Roman architecture a cryptoporticus (from Latin crypta and porticus) is a covered corridor or passageway. The usual English is "cryptoportico". The cryptoportico is a semi-subterranean gallery whose vaulting supports portico structures aboveground and which is lit from openings at the tops of its arches.

On sloping sites the open side of a cryptoporticus is often partially at ground level and supports a structure such as a forum or Roman villa, in which case it served as basis villae. It is often vaulted and lit by openings in the vault. In the letters of Pliny the Younger, the term is used as a synonym of crypt. The shade and semi-excavated site of a cryptoporticus provided cool and moderated temperatures useful for storage of perishables, while it offered a level and slightly raised podium for the superstructure.

== Examples ==
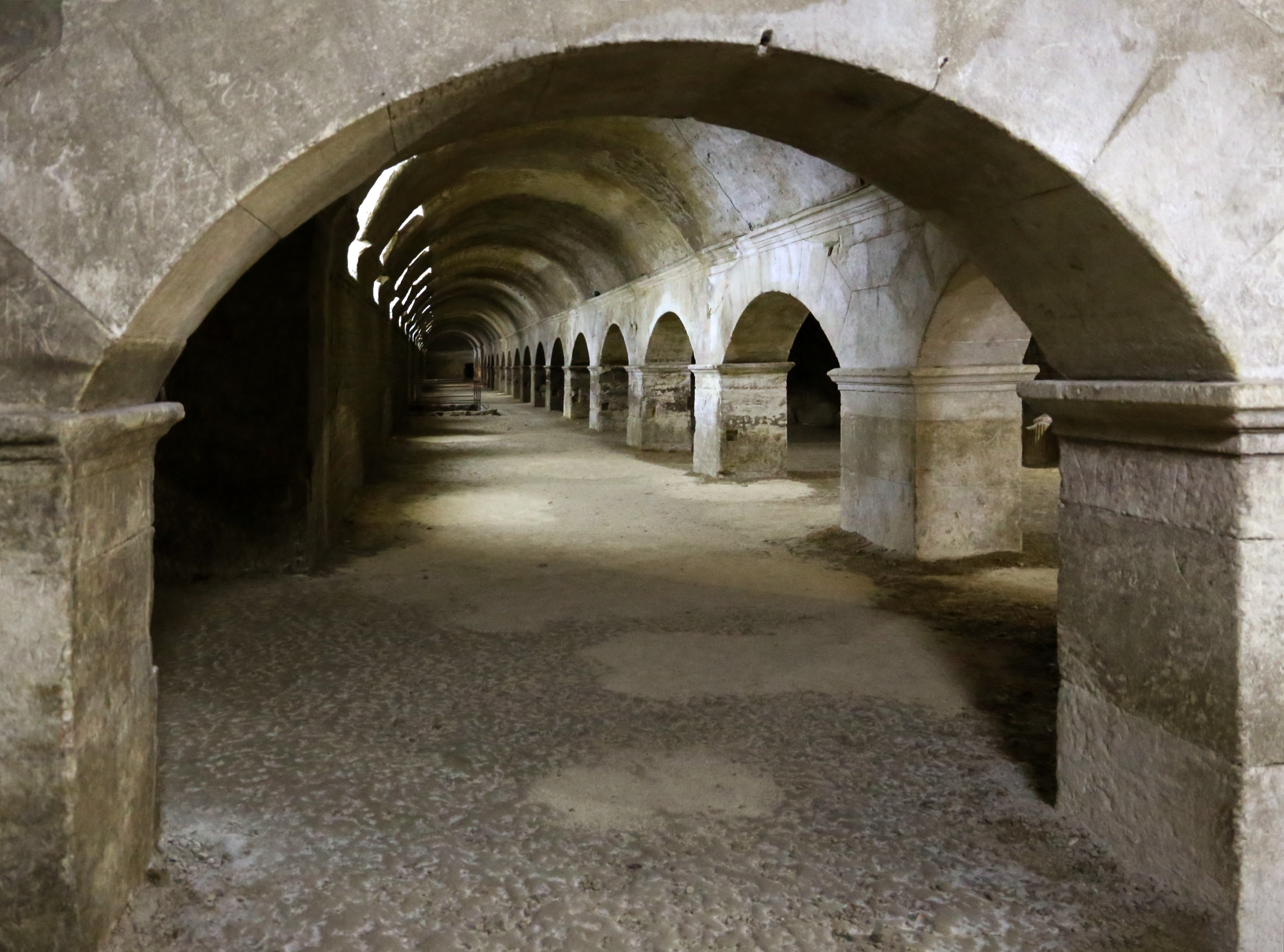
The cryptoporticus of Arles

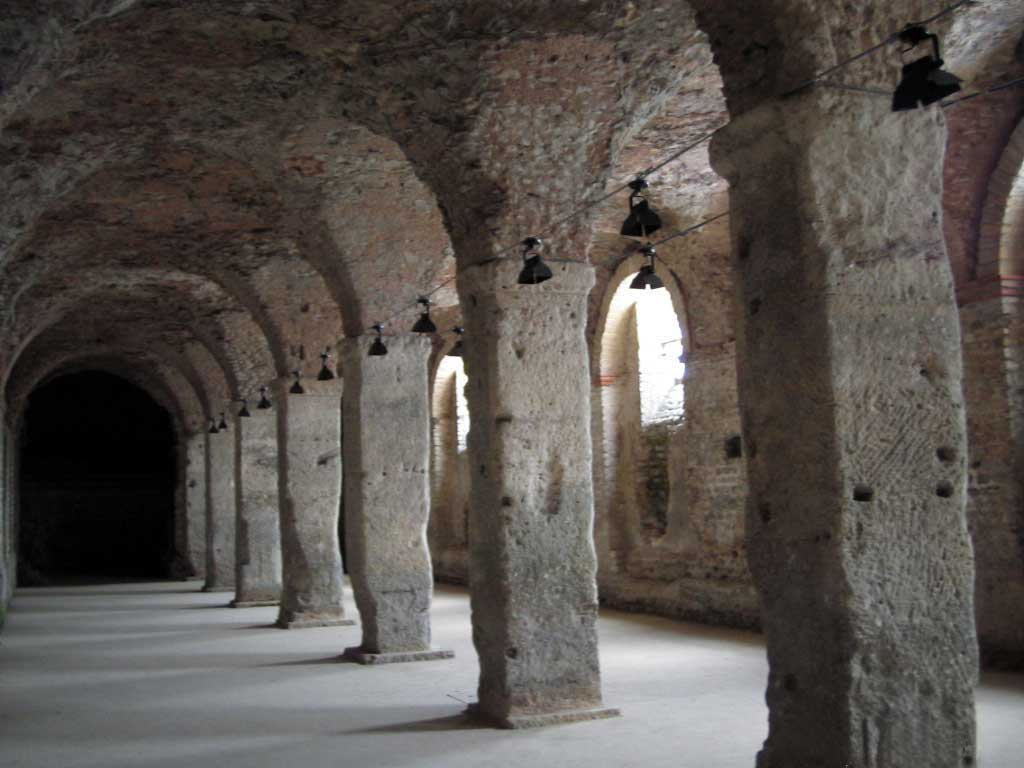
Cryptoportico in the Roman forum at Reims, built in the third century AD

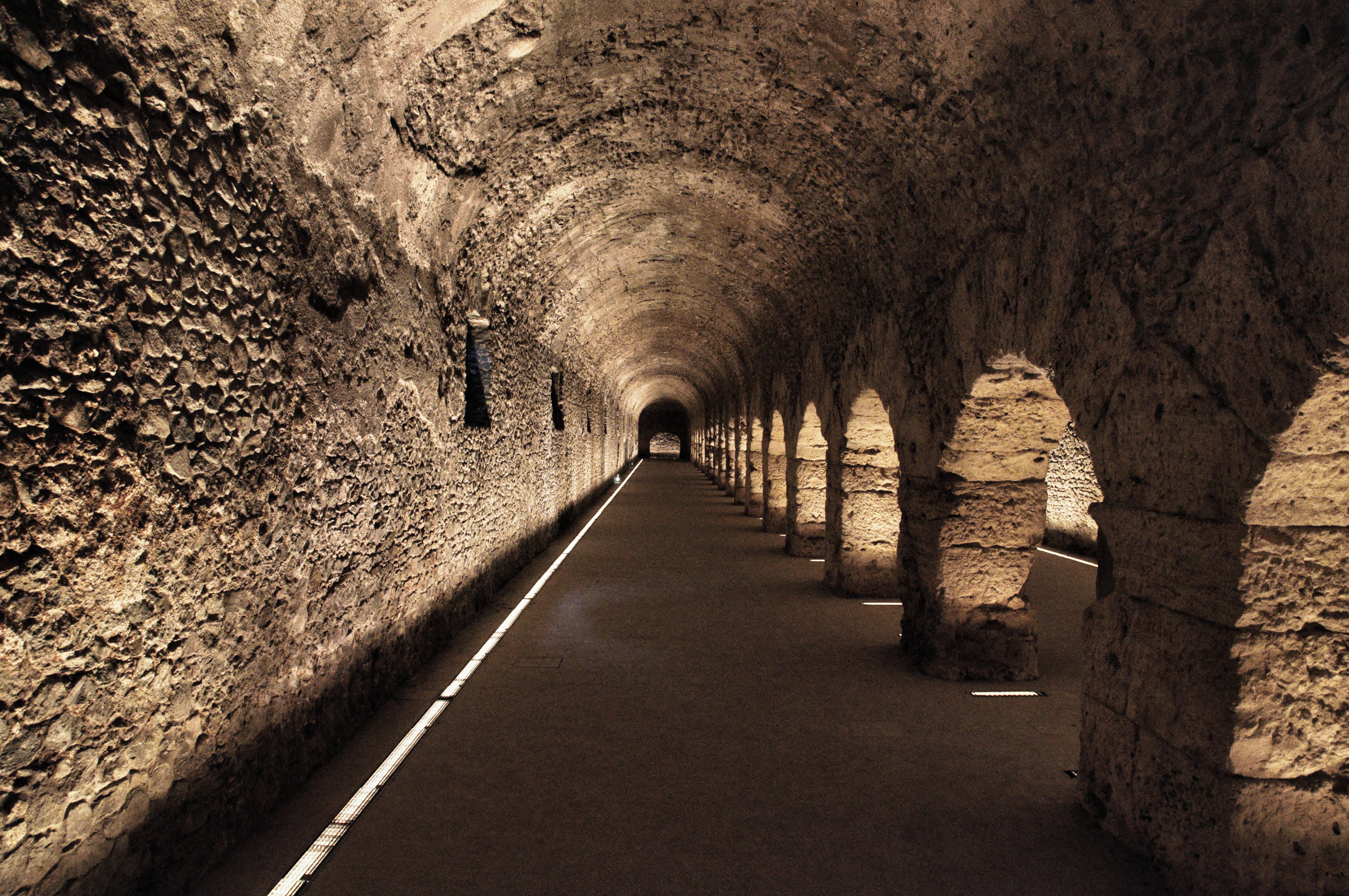
Cryptoporticus (Aosta)

=== Coimbra ===
The cryptoporticus of Coimbra, the old Roman city of Aeminium, was built to create an artificial platform over which the city's forum could be built. Later, the Bishop's Palace (still standing today as Machado de Castro National Museum) was built using the platform created by the structure thus preserving it in perfect condition.

=== Arles ===
The cryptoporticus of Arles, dating from the 1st century BC was built as foundation for the forum, which has since been replaced by the Chapel of the Jesuit College and the city hall. Three double, parallel tunnels arranged in the form of a U are supported by fifty piers. Masons' marks on the stonework indicate that it was built by Greeks, probably from Marseille. Similar structures in Narbonne, Reims, and Bavay were used as granaries. The cryptoporticus at Arles is, however, too damp for prolonged storage and may have served as a barracks for public slaves. The cryptoporticus of Arles is listed as a UNESCO World Heritage Site, together with other Roman buildings of the city, as part of the Arles, Roman and Romanesque Monuments group.

=== Reims ===
The cryptoporticus of Reims, formerly enclosing three sides of the forum, is of Gallo-Roman origin and was probably built during the 3rd century. Today, only its Eastern part remains, but this is unusually well preserved for a Gallo-Roman structure.

=== Vicenza ===
The Roman cryptoporticus of Vicenza is a well-preserved structure from ancient Vicetia dating to the late 1st century BC. Located beneath the cathedral's rectory and Palazzo Roma, it is accessible via an entrance in Piazza del Duomo.

=== Other places ===
Other well-known examples include the cryptoporticus of Hadrian's Villa and that of the House of the Cryptoporticus in Pompeii. A well-preserved cryptoporticus is also located at the Papal Summer Residence in Castel Gandolfo, Italy. In Rome, a cryptoporticus is located in the Catacomb of Priscilla, a remnant from a large Roman villa.
