= Pompejanum =

Replica of a Roman villa in Aschaffenburg, Bavaria, Germany

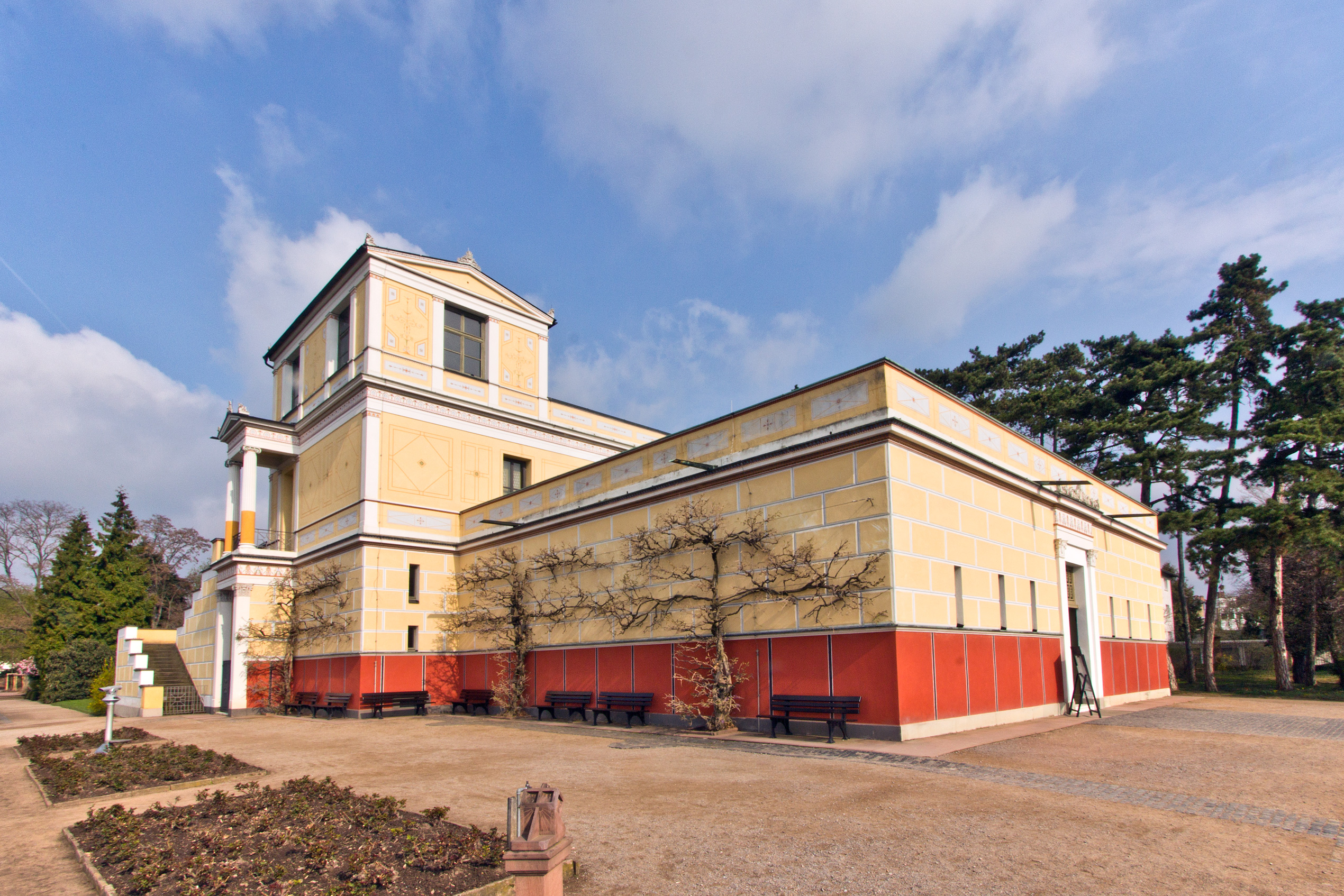
- The Pompejanum

- Location within Bavaria Location within Germany
- Interactive map of the Pompejanum area
- Alternative names: Pompeiianum

General information
- Architectural style: Roman
- Location: Aschaffenburg, Germany
- Coordinates: 49°58′41″N 9°08′10″E
- Construction started: 1840
- Completed: 1848
- Client: Ludwig I of Bavaria
- Owner: Bayerische Verwaltung der staatlichen Schlösser, Gärten und Seen

Design and construction
- Architect: Friedrich von Gärtner

The Pompejanum (or Pompeiianum) is an idealised replica of a Roman villa, located on the high banks of the river Main in Aschaffenburg, Bavaria, Germany. It was commissioned by King Ludwig I and built in the 1840s. The villa is a replica of a domus in Pompeii, the so-called House of Castor and Pollux (Casa dei Dioscuri).

== Location ==
The Pompejanum is situated on the high bank of the river Main in the city of Aschaffenburg, in the Lower Franconia region of Bavaria. It is located within sight of Schloss Johannisburg. The Pompejanum is surrounded by a small Mediterranean garden, first created in the 19th century when the building was constructed.

== History ==
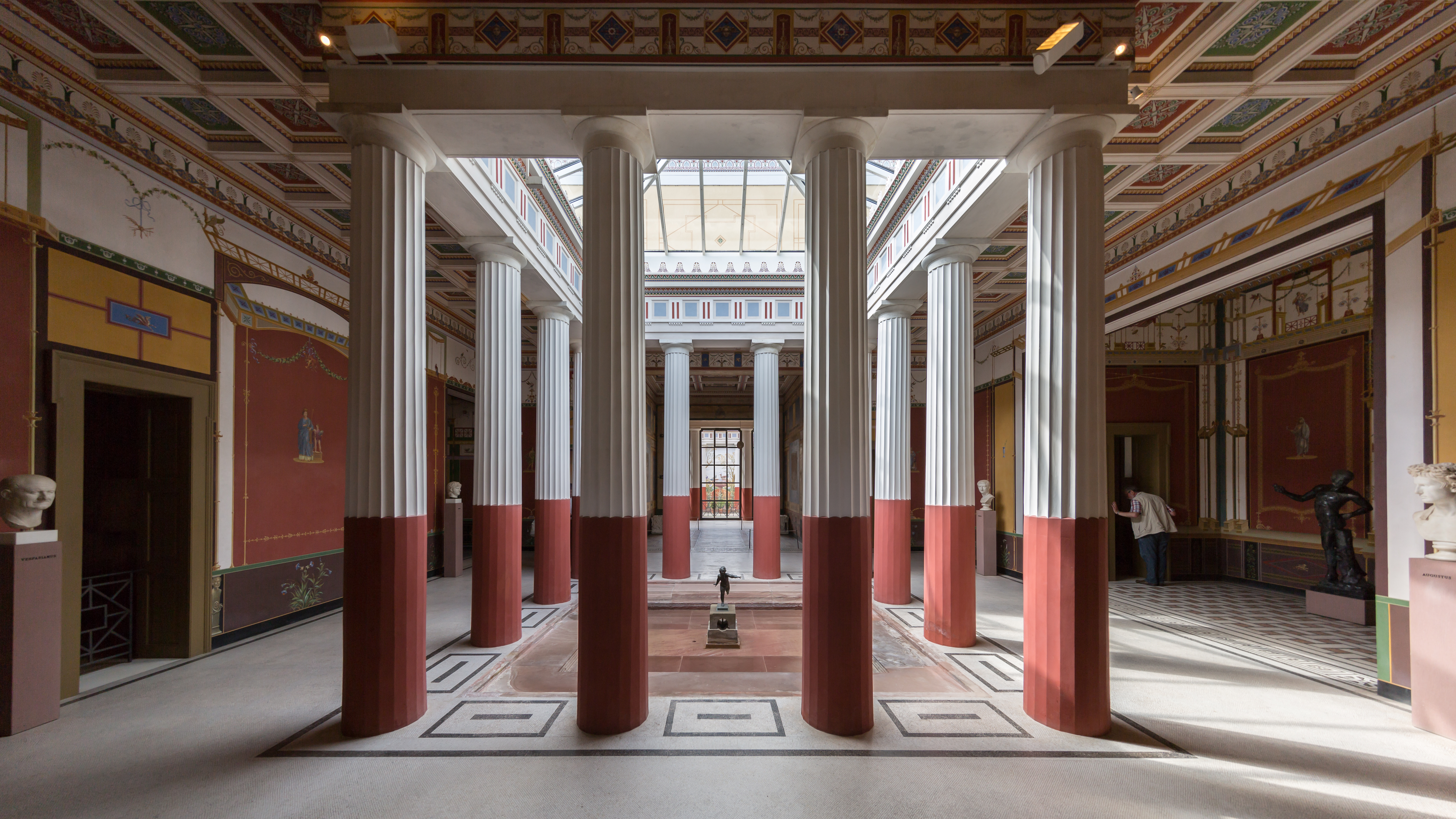
The inner courtyard

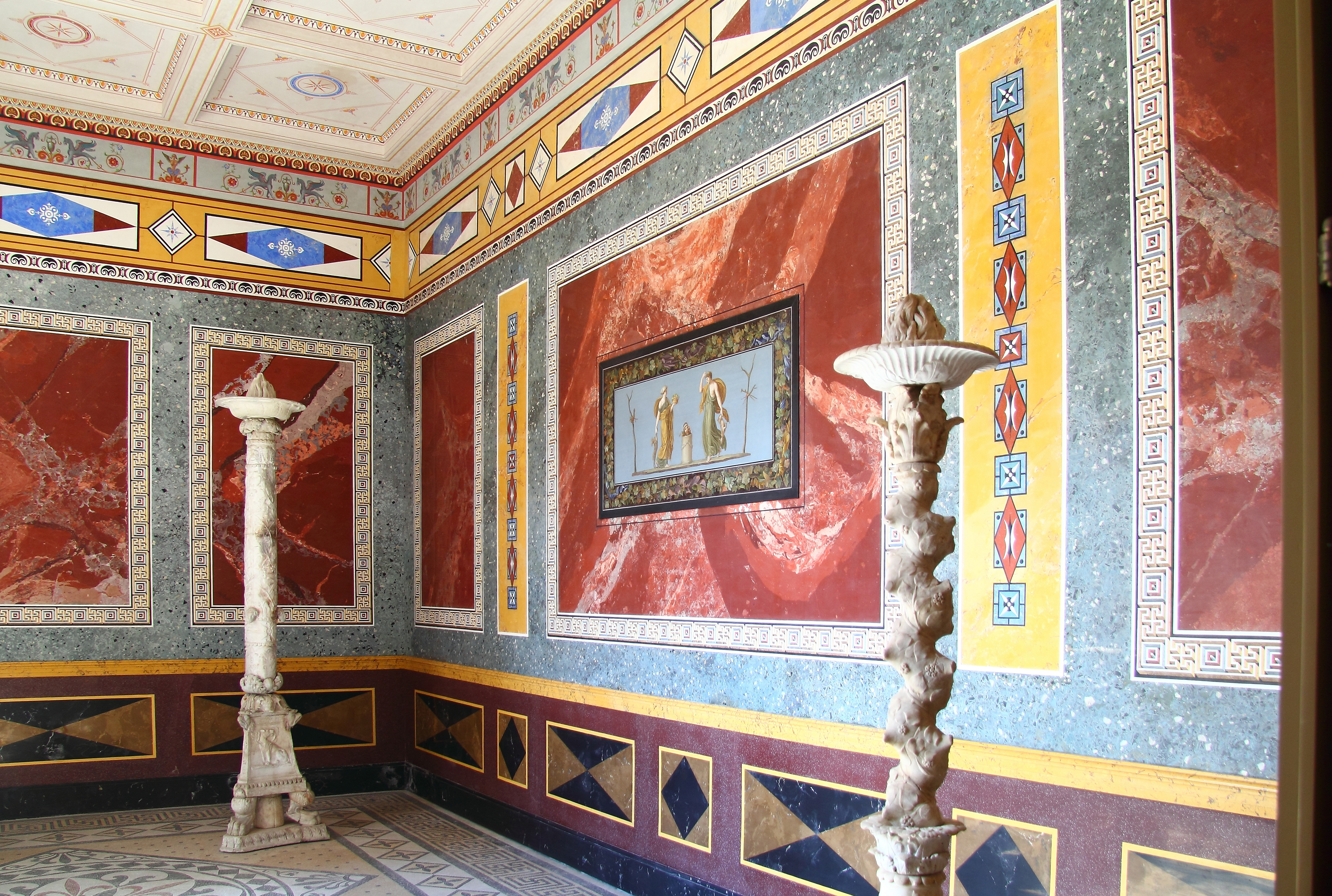
The interior with replicas of wall-painting

The Pompejanum was commissioned by King Ludwig I and built in the years 1840-1848 according to the plans of the court architect Friedrich von Gärtner. The Pompejanum was not intended as a royal villa, but as a demonstration that would allow art lovers in Germany to study ancient culture. The building is considered to be an example of the enthusiasm for classical antiquity in the 19th century.

During World War II the Pompejanum was heavily damaged and restored in phases beginning in 1960. A Roman bust found in Texas in 2018, believed to be of Sextus Pompeius, was returned to the museum in 2023.

== Today ==
Since 1994, the Pompejanum houses original Roman art works from the collections of the Staatliche Antikensammlungen and the Glyptothek in Munich. The building also hosts temporary exhibitions.

== See also ==
- Pompeian Red
