= Pompeian red =

Reddish pigment

Pompeian red refers to the color of iron oxide-based mineral pigment with a hue close to red ochre, so named because of its common use in ancient Roman painting and the fact that it is abundant in the murals of Pompeii. Studies have shown that walls with Pompeian red backgrounds were painted in various ways, of which the use of cinnabar was the most expensive.

This term also defines the ochre-red color of a plaster characteristic of Roman ceramics.

== History of the concept ==
The concept of Pompeian red was born with the real rediscovery of the site of Pompeii in the 18th century and its influence on art and taste in Europe. The Café Procope in Paris, redecorated in the 1980s in a style reminiscent of late eighteenth-century taste, was covered with Pompeian red walls. In the 19th century, museums often adopted Pompeian red for their walls. It was widely used in the decoration of residences and palaces built in the 19th century to emulate the great Roman villas, such as the Pompeian House (now gone) built by Prince Napoléon-Jérôme Bonaparte on Avenue Montaigne in Paris, or the Pompejanum built by Ludwig I of Bavaria in Aschaffenburg.

Pompeian red is not a color defined from a chromatic point of view or according to the pigments used, but an aesthetic and cultural reference.

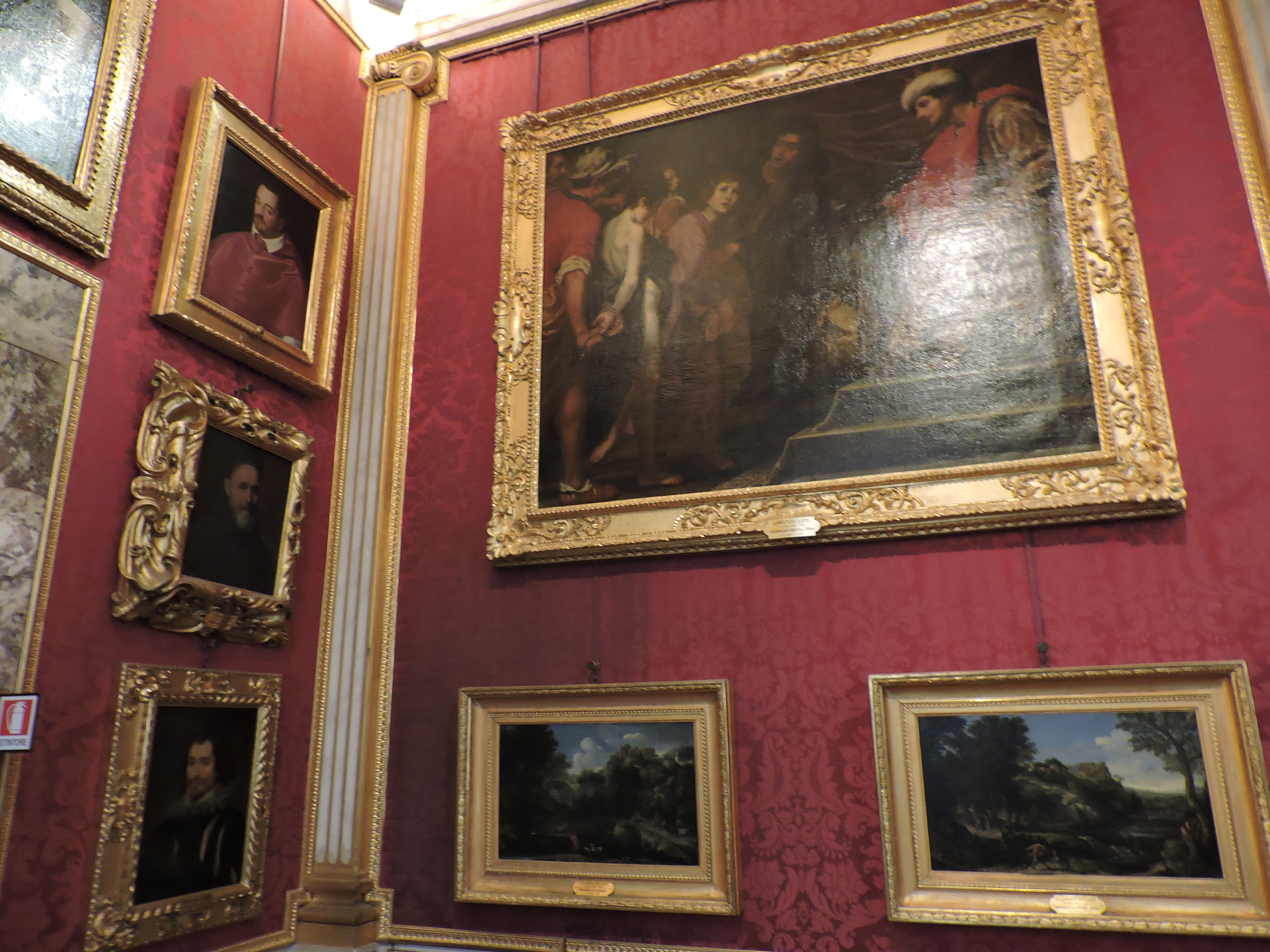
Palatine Gallery, Pitti Palace, Florence.

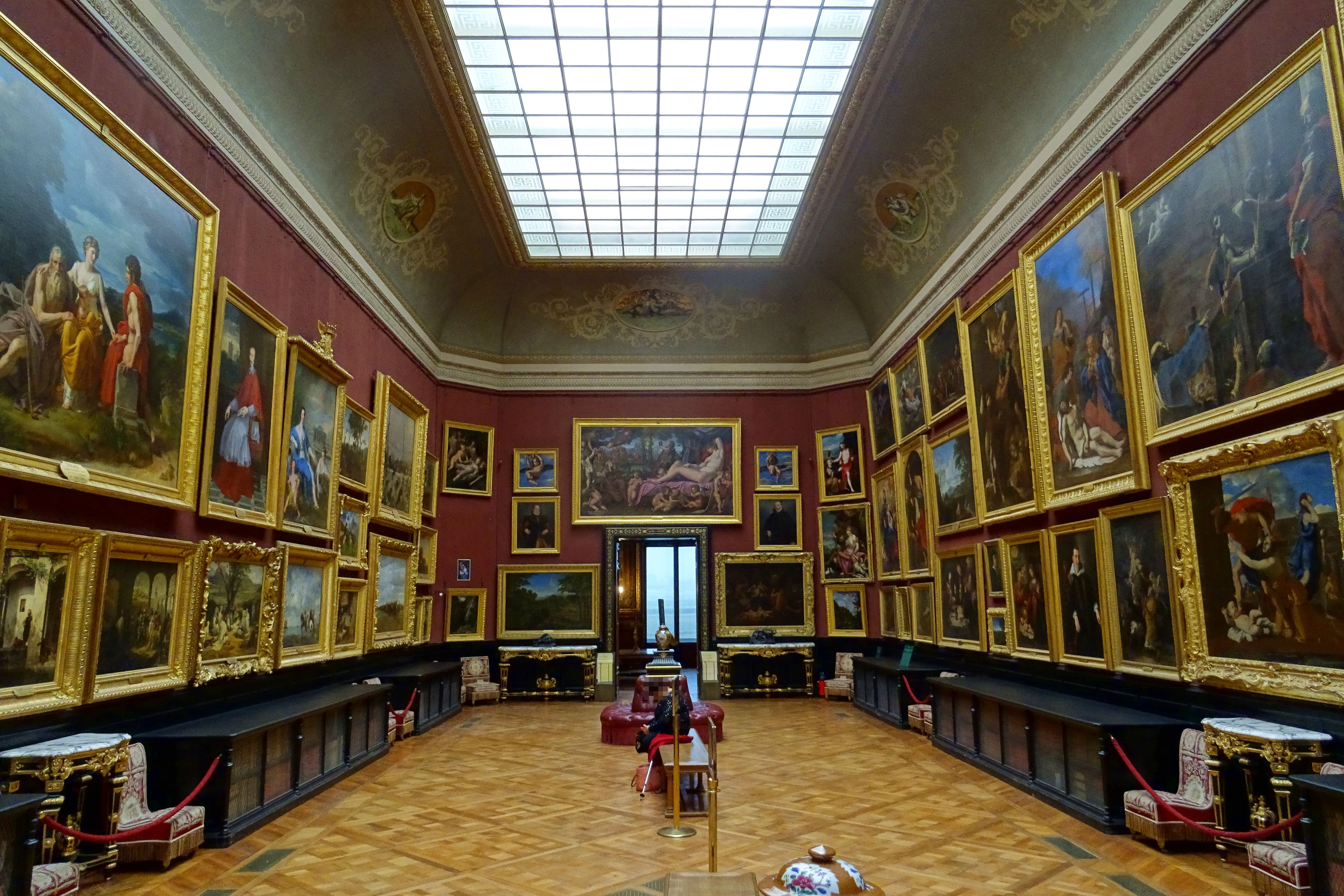
The Painting Gallery at the Condé Museum (Château de Chantilly).

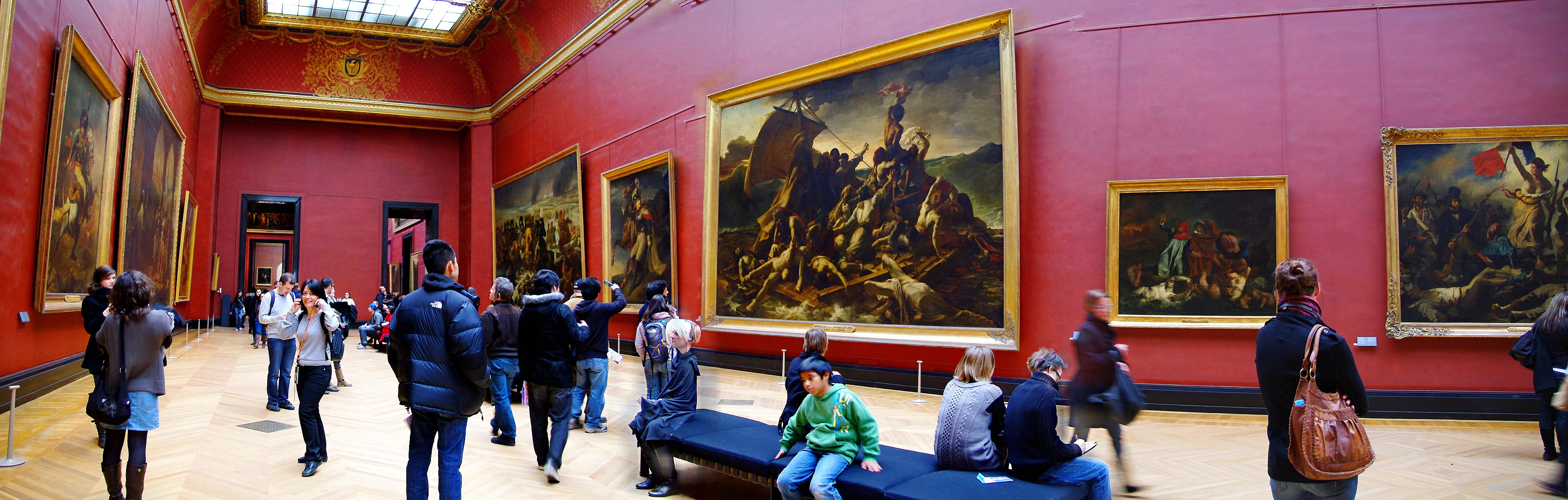
Louvre Museum, Red Mollien Room (Romanticism).

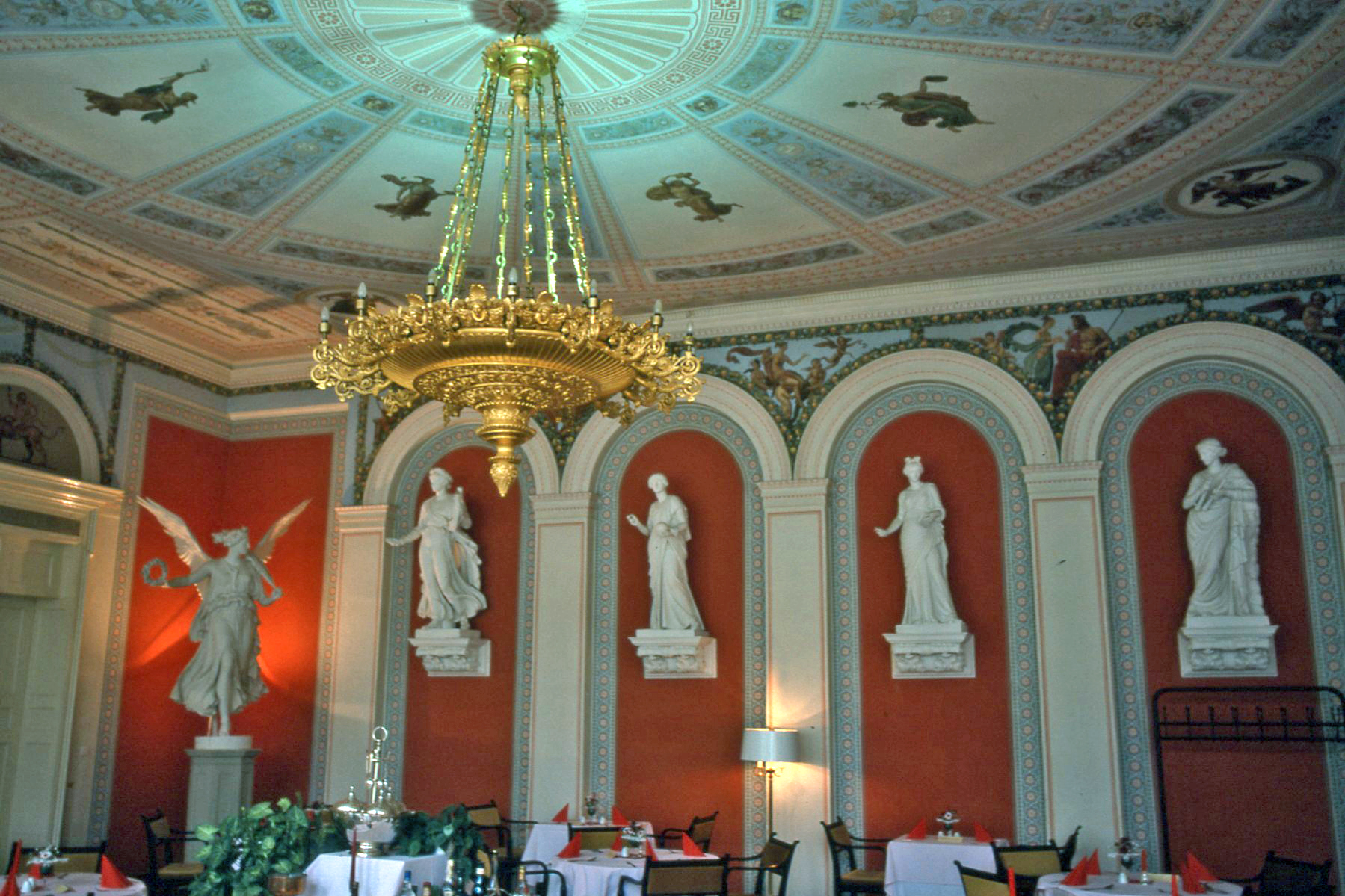
Neustrelitz Orangerie, Mecklenburg-Vorpommern (Germany). Red room.

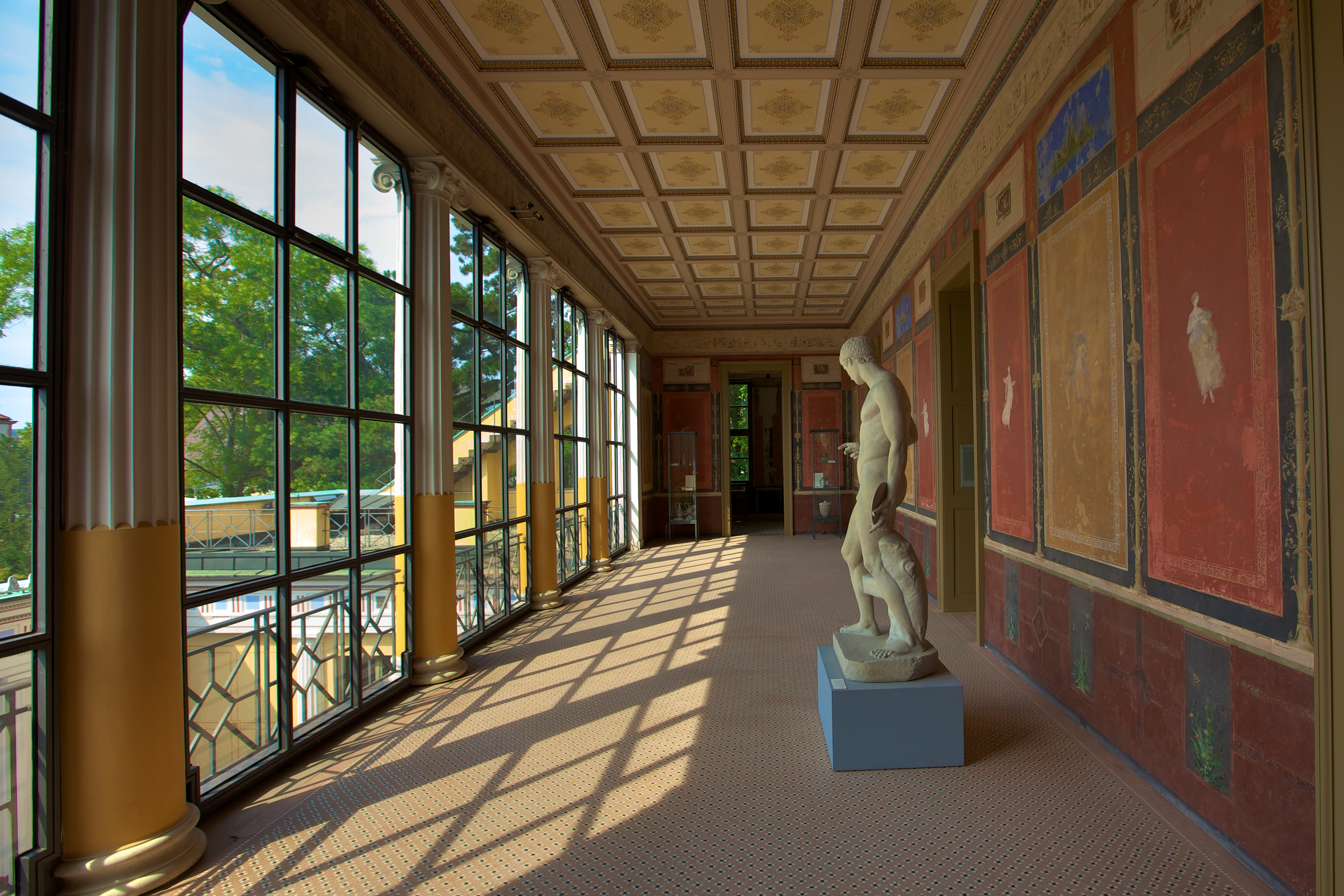
Pompejanum. Aschaffenburg, Bavaria (Germany).

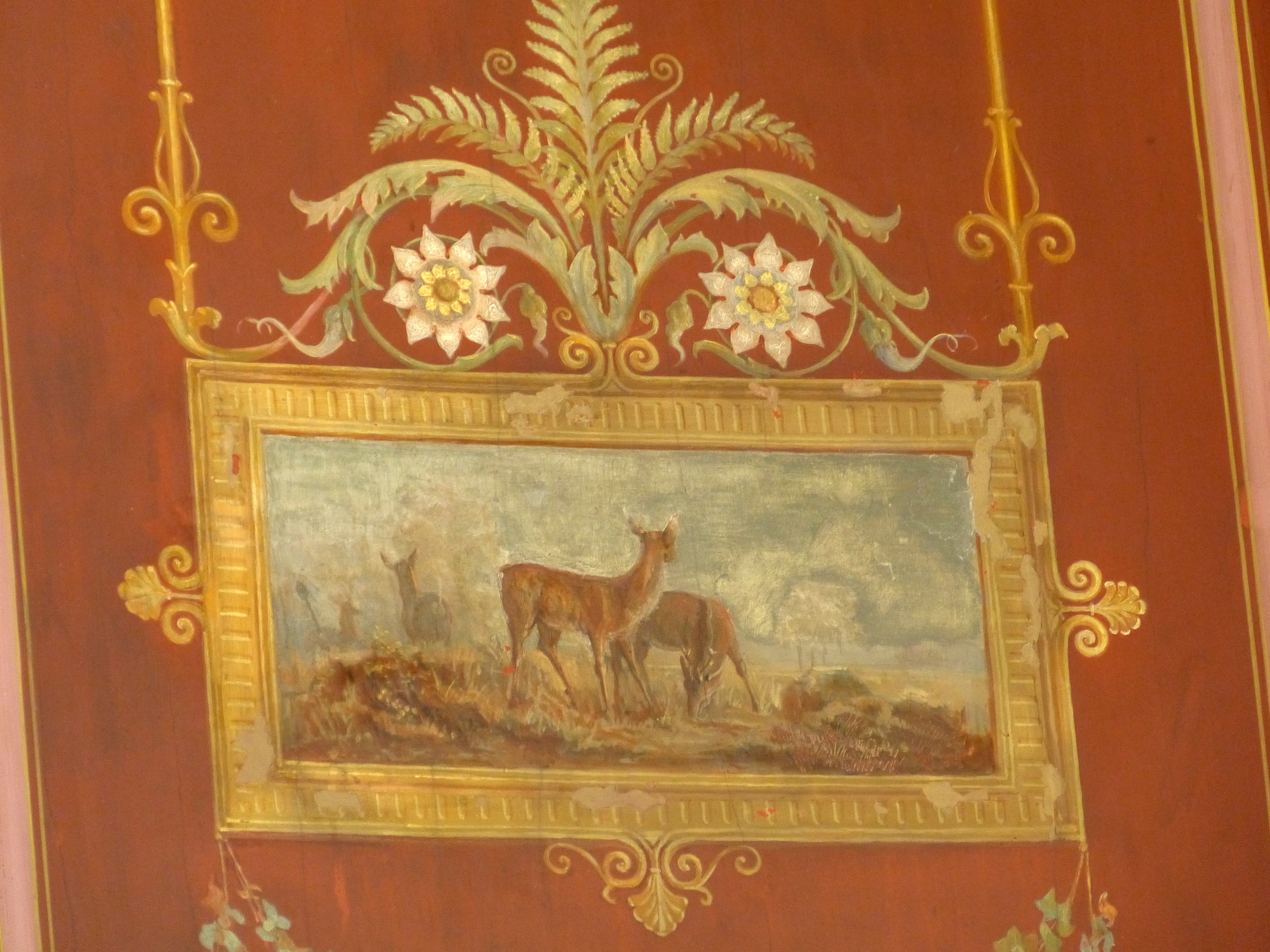
Schwerin Castle (Germany), Léandre's Chamber.

== Red pigments in Pompeii ==
It's important not to confuse the colors obtained with the pigments used to make them. The Latin vocabulary is imprecise in this area, and Pliny the Elder, who is the main source of colors in ancient painting, confuses the terms that designate one or the other. The French term rouge pompéien refers to a set of hues obtained, to dark reds varying roughly around red ochre, sometimes tending more or less toward brown ochre or violet, and not to a particular pigment.

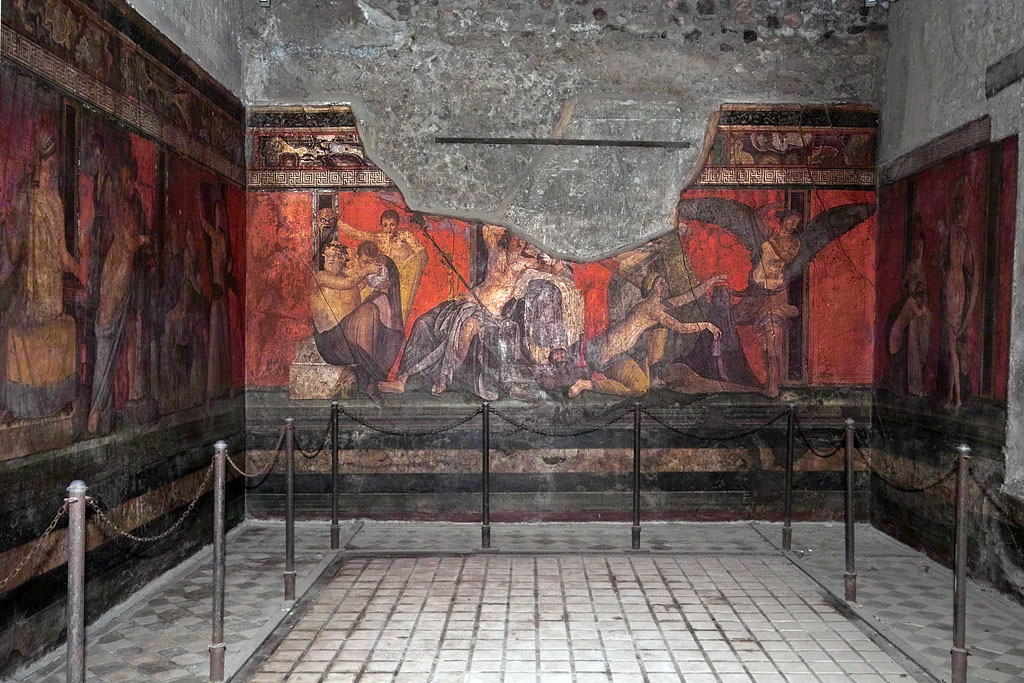
Villa of the Mysteries, Pompeii.

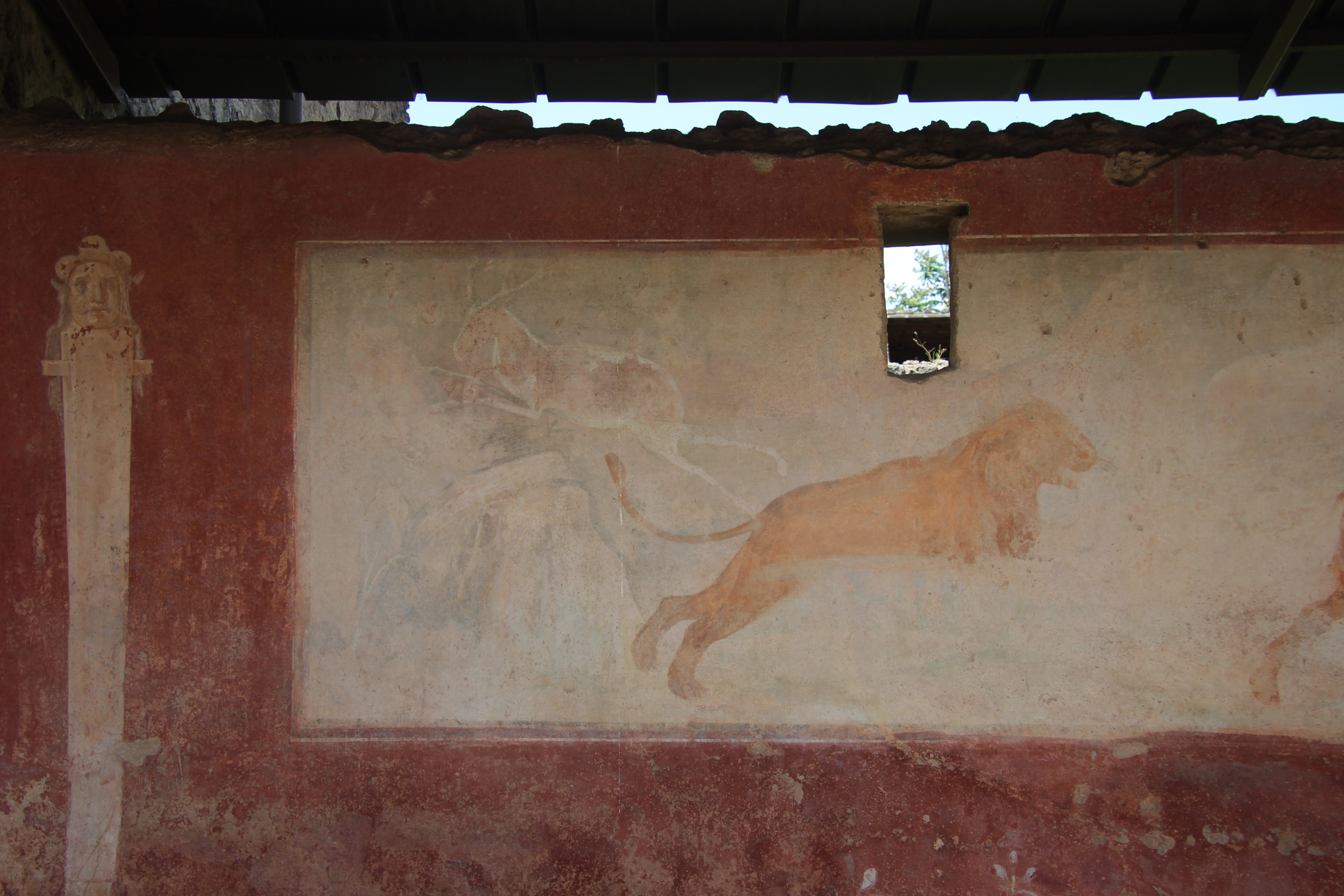
House of Octavius Quartio.

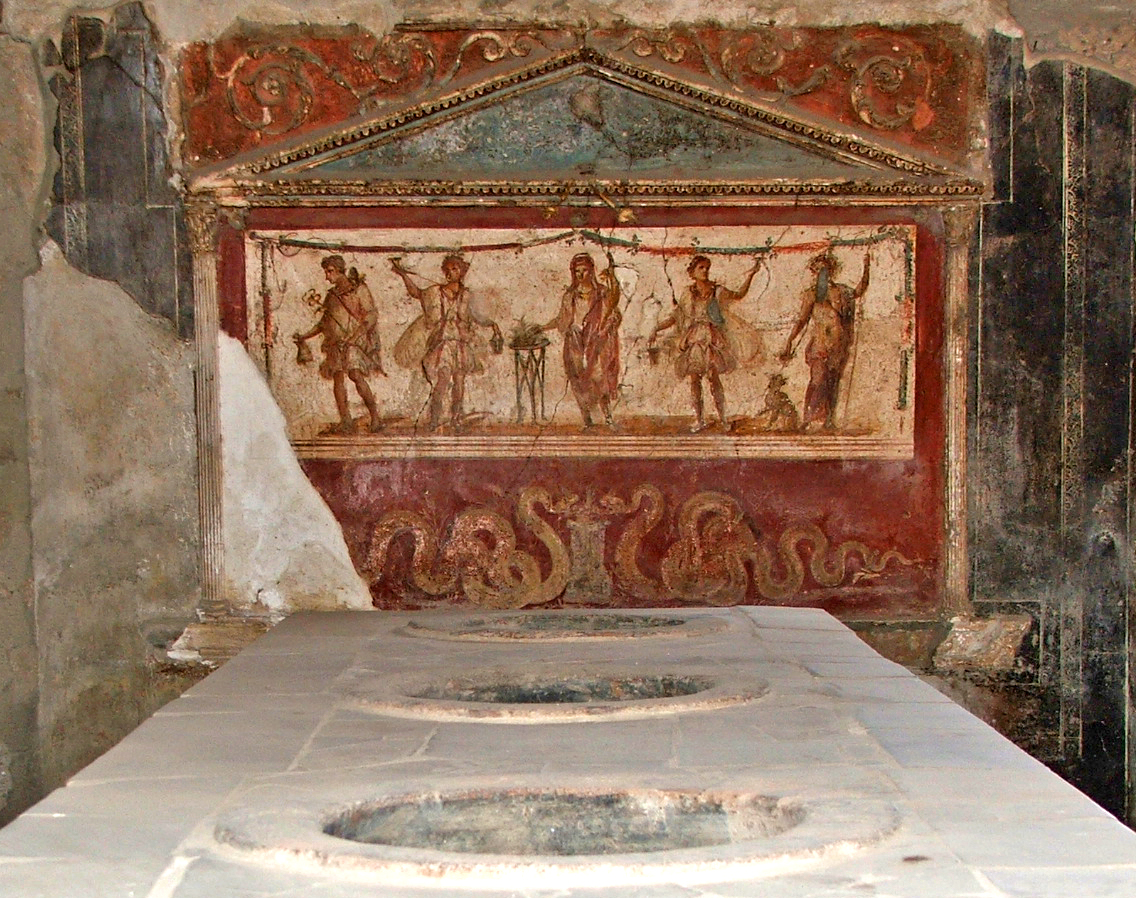
Thermopolium of Vetutius Placidus.

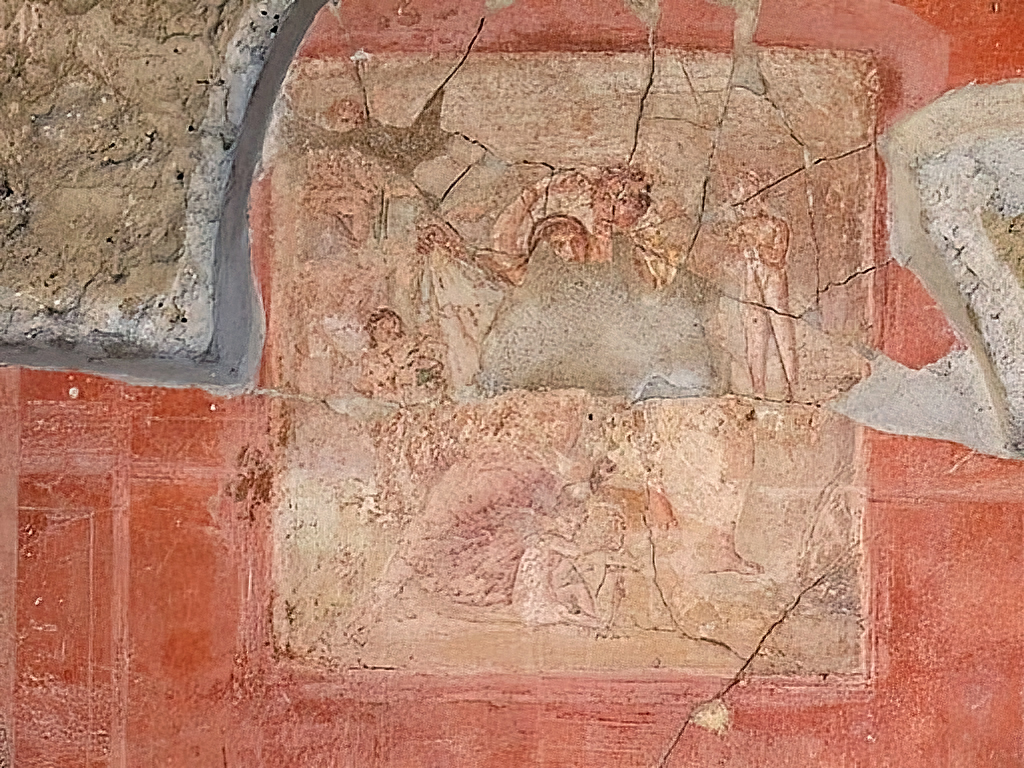
House of Greek epigrams.

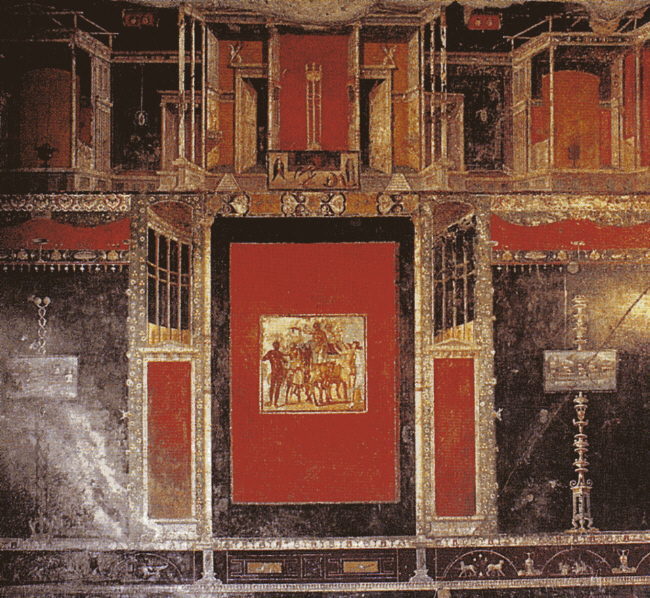
House of Lucretius Fronto.

The red pigments used in Pompeii to obtain Pompeian red include cinnabar, sinopis, and red ochre (rubrica). Painters also overlaid layers of different pigments.

It could also be yellow ochre, whose color was transformed into red ochre at the time of the eruption due to the effect of heat, a mutation already known to the ancients when exposed to heat above 700 °C. A team led by Sergio Omarini has shown that an important part of the red walls of Pompeii must have been yellow ochre before the eruption of 79; the impression we have today of a strong predominance of red, which gave rise to the expression Pompeian red, does not, therefore, correspond to the impression that contemporaries had.

== See also ==
- Red
- Sinopia
- Pompeian Styles

== Bibliography ==
- Augusti, Selim (1967). I Colori pompeiani (in Italian). Rome: De Luca Editore. p. 163.
- Eastaugh, Nicholas; Walsh, Valentine; Chaplin, Tracey; Siddall, Ruth (2004). The Pigment Compendium. A Dictionary of Historical Pigments. Elsevier Butterworth Heinemen.
- Croisille, Jean-Michel (2005). "Couleurs". La peinture romaine (in French). Paris: Picard. pp. 289 and following.
- Montagna, Giovanni (1993). I Pigmenti (in Italian). Florence: Nardini.
