= Musée Condé =

Museum in Chantilly, France

Coordinates: 49°11′38″N 2°29′07″E

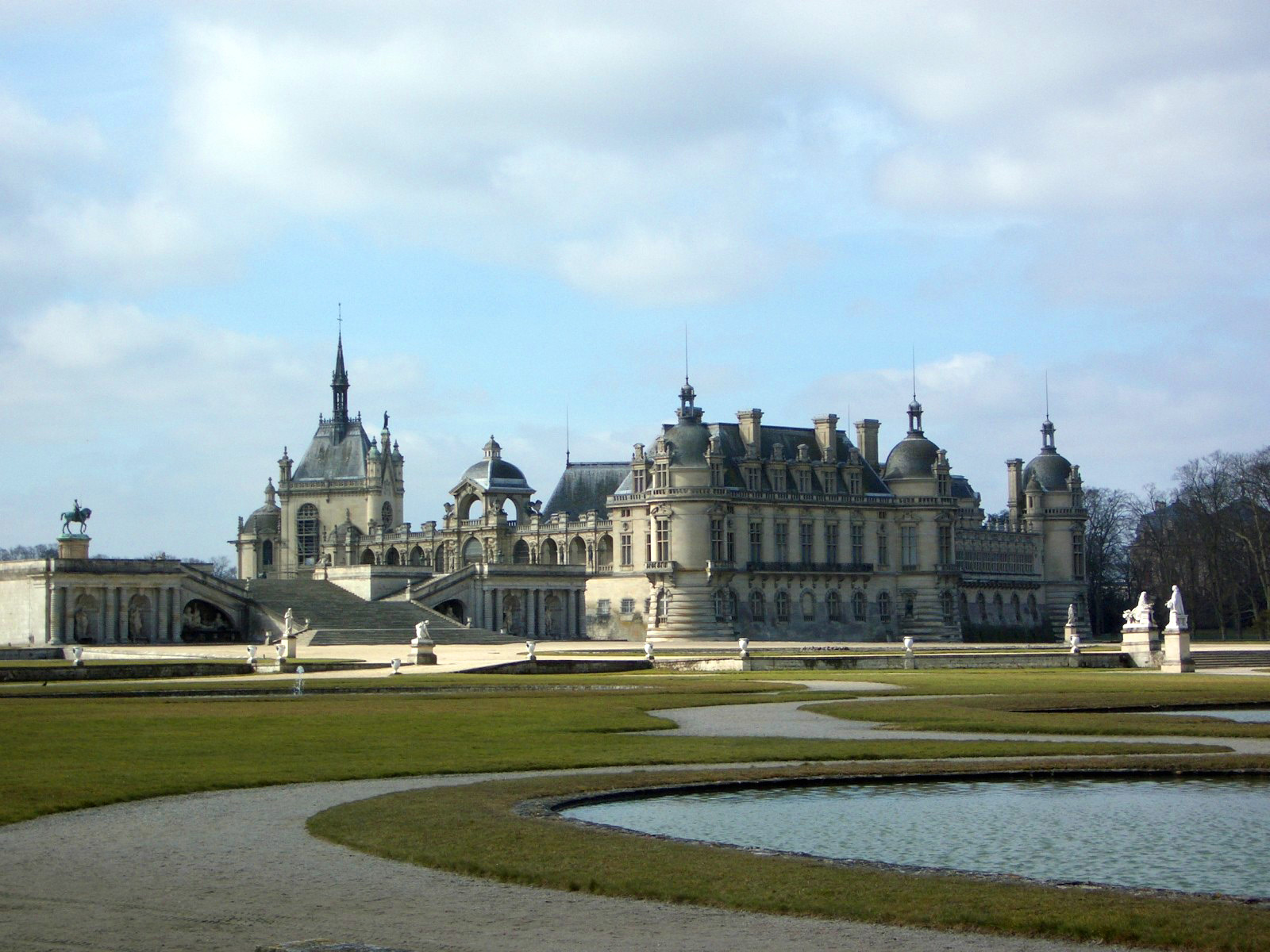
The Château de Chantilly

The Musée Condé (French: [myze kɔ̃de]) – in English, the Condé Museum – is a French museum located inside the Château de Chantilly in Chantilly, Oise, 40 km (24.8 mi) north of Paris. In 1897, Henri d'Orléans, Duke of Aumale, son of Louis Philippe I, bequeathed the château and its collections to the Institut de France. It included rooms remodeled as museum spaces and those left as residential quarters in the styles of the 18th and 19th centuries.

== Collections ==
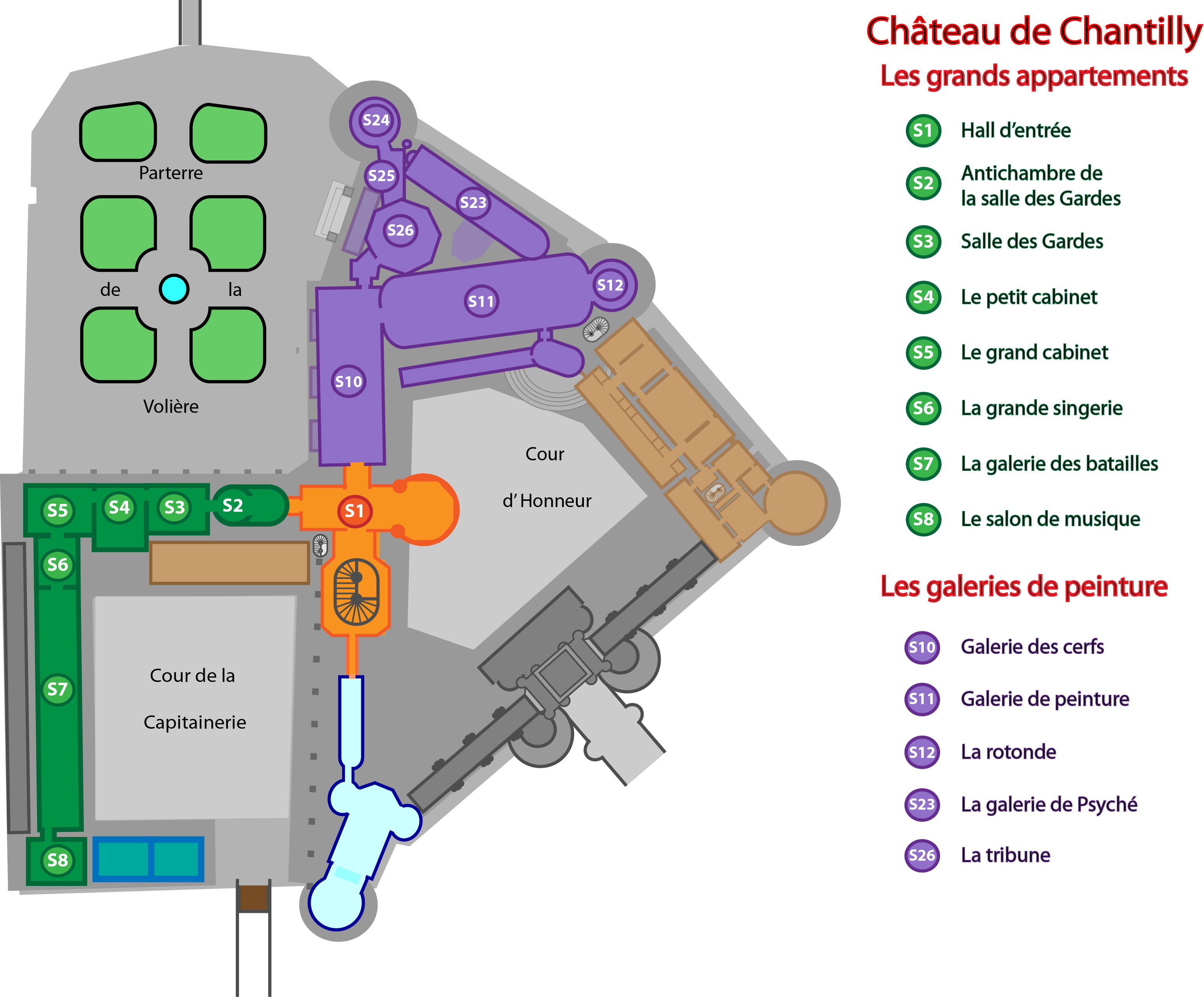
Museum map

The collection of old master paintings is among the most important in France. It consists predominantly of Italian and French works and includes three paintings by Fra Angelico, three by Raphael, five by Nicolas Poussin, four by Antoine Watteau and five signed by Jean-Auguste-Dominique Ingres.

The museum harbors a collection of 2,500 drawings and a library including 1,500 manuscripts, of which 200 are illuminated. The most renowned of the latter are the Très Riches Heures du Duc de Berry. In addition to these, there are collections of prints, portrait miniatures, sculptures, antiques, old photographs, decorative arts, furniture and porcelain.

The collection may only be seen at Chantilly due to the conditions attached to the bequest by the Duke d'Aumale. These conditions forbid the loaning of artworks to other institutions as well as insisting that the exhibition spaces not be modified in any way. As a result, the museum remains almost unchanged since it was opened in 1898. About 250,000 visitors come to the museum each year.

Also in the museum's collection is the Chantilly codex (MS 564), the primary manuscript of ars subtilior music.

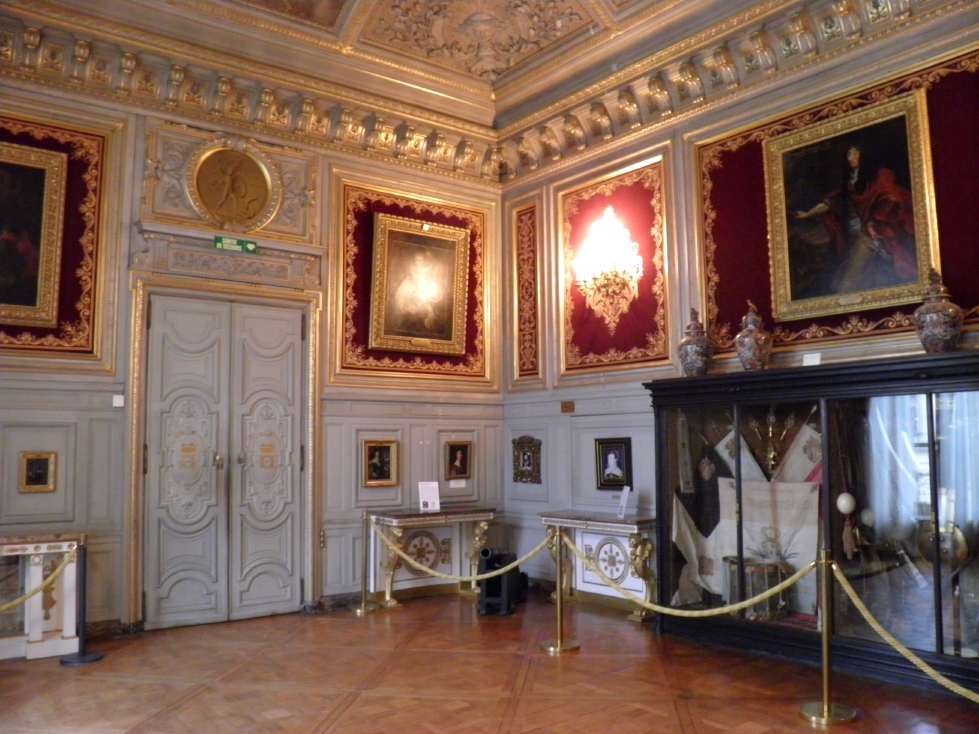
Salle des gardes

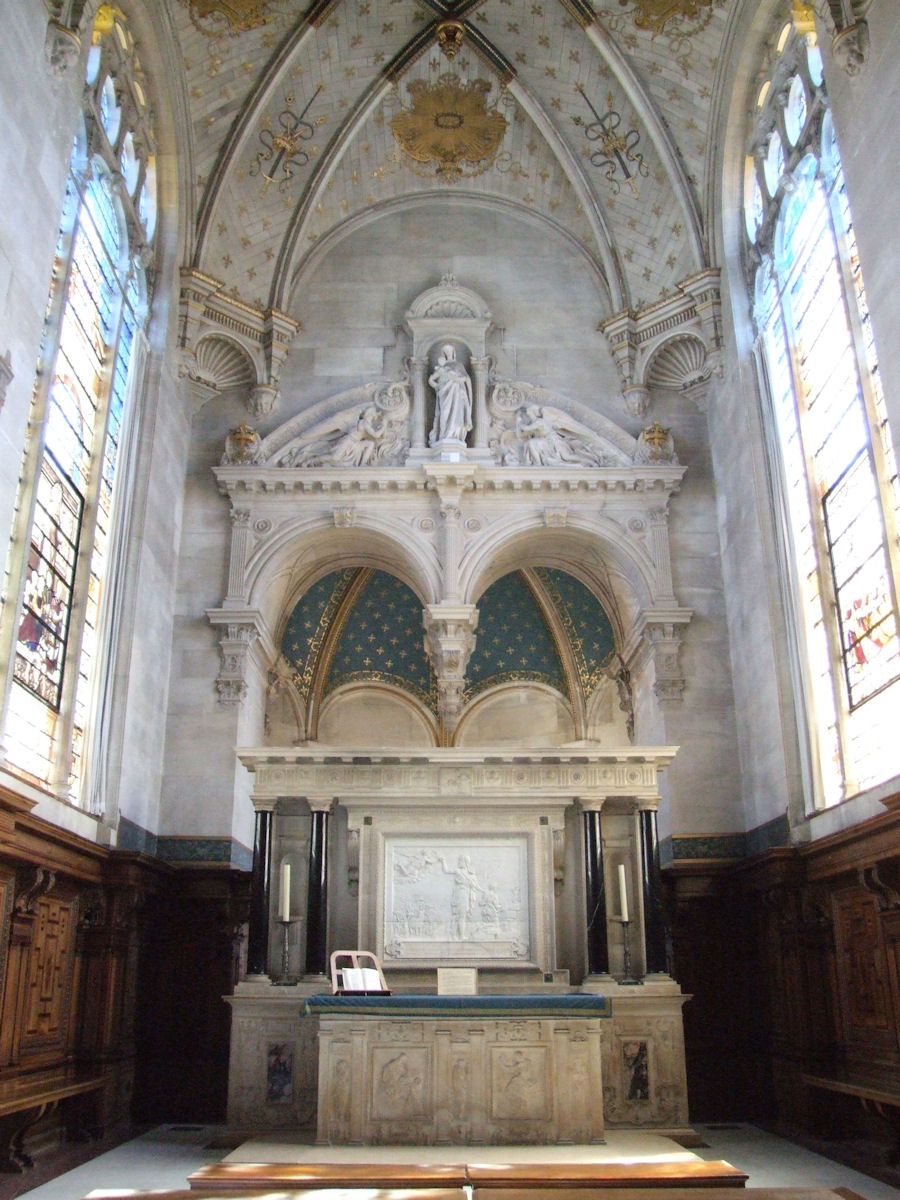
Chapelle Saint-Louis

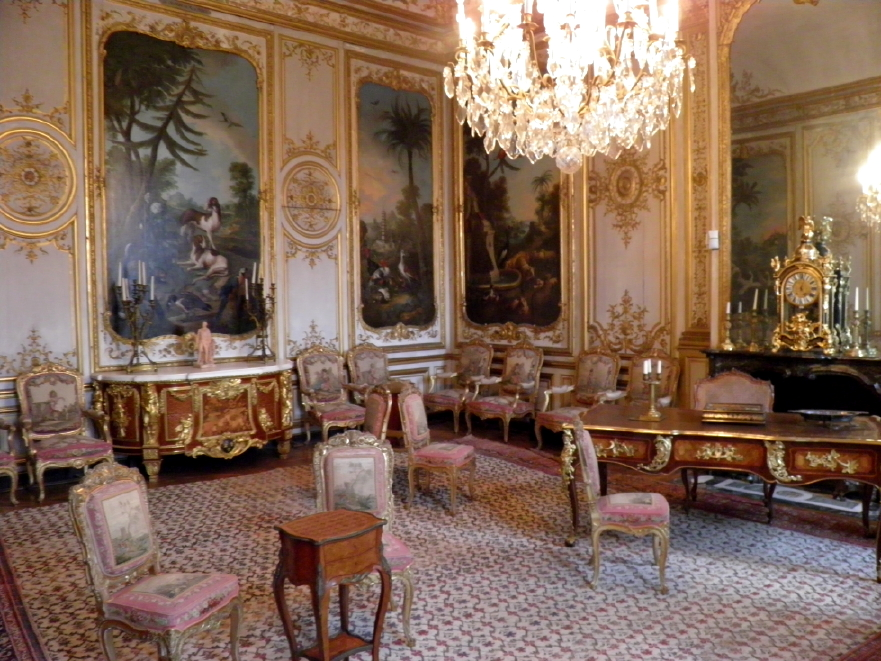
Chambre de Monsieur le Prince

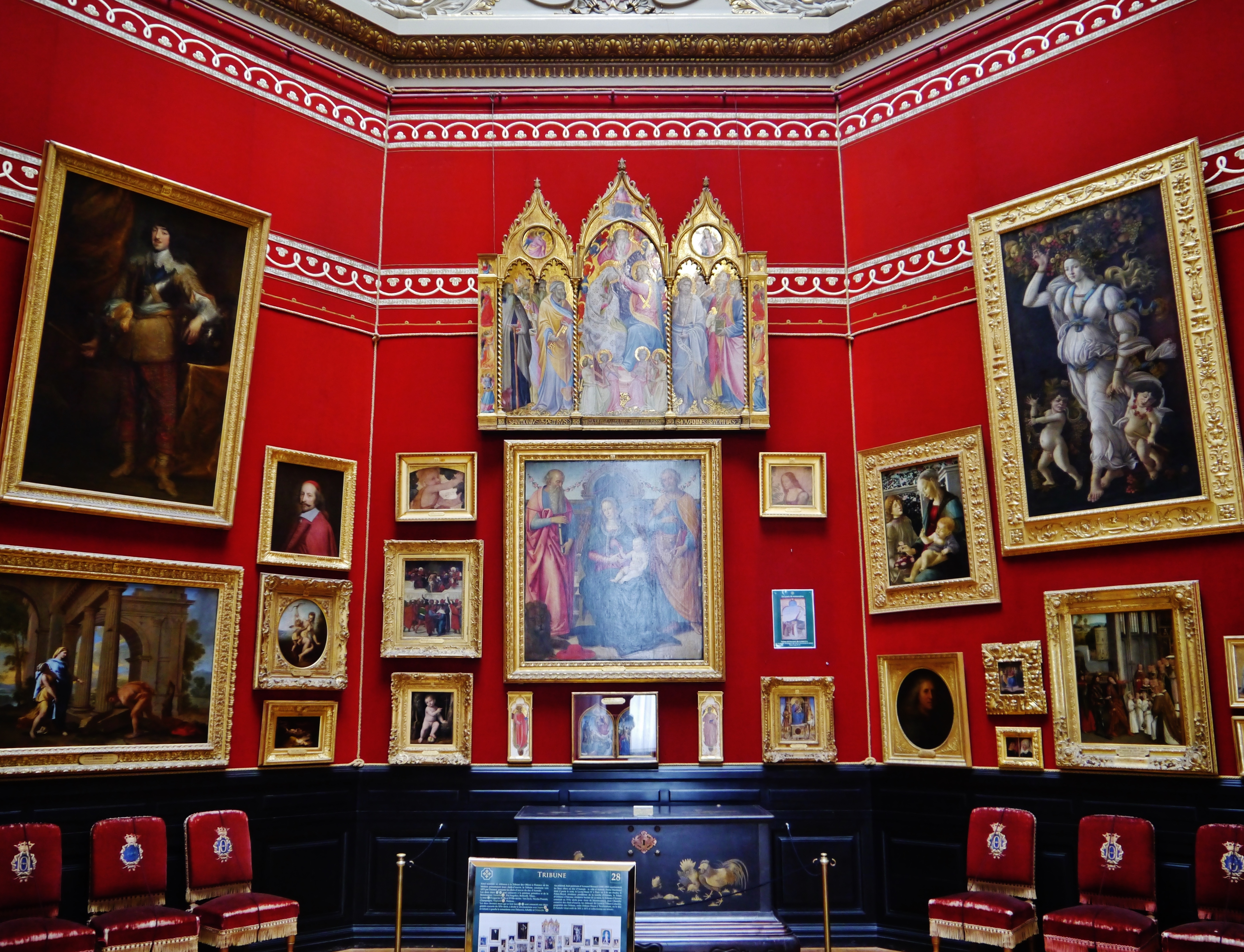
La Tribune

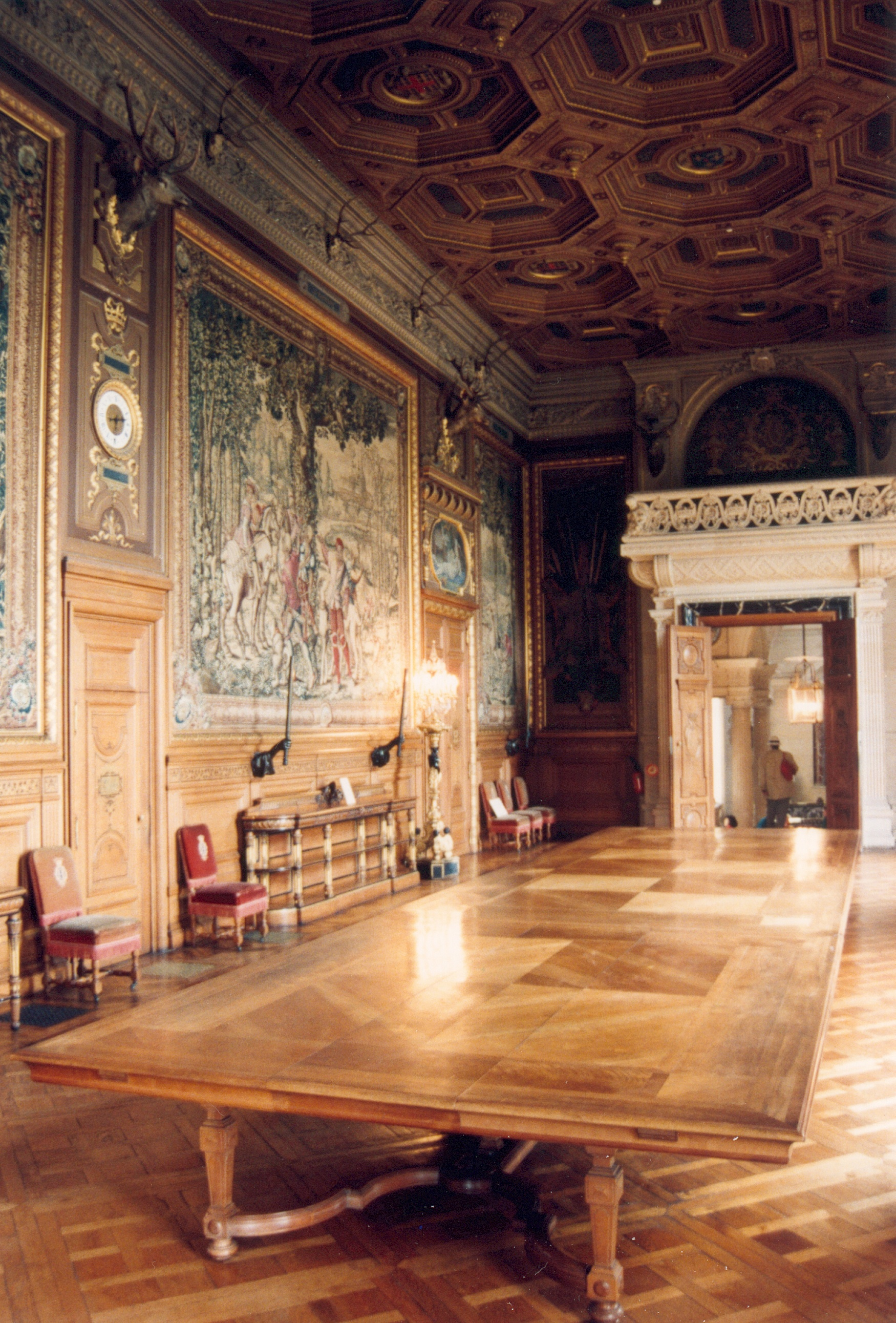
Galerie des cerfs

== See also ==
- Paul Dubois (sculptor)

== Related articles ==
- Pompeian Red
