= Galley =

Ship mainly propelled by oars

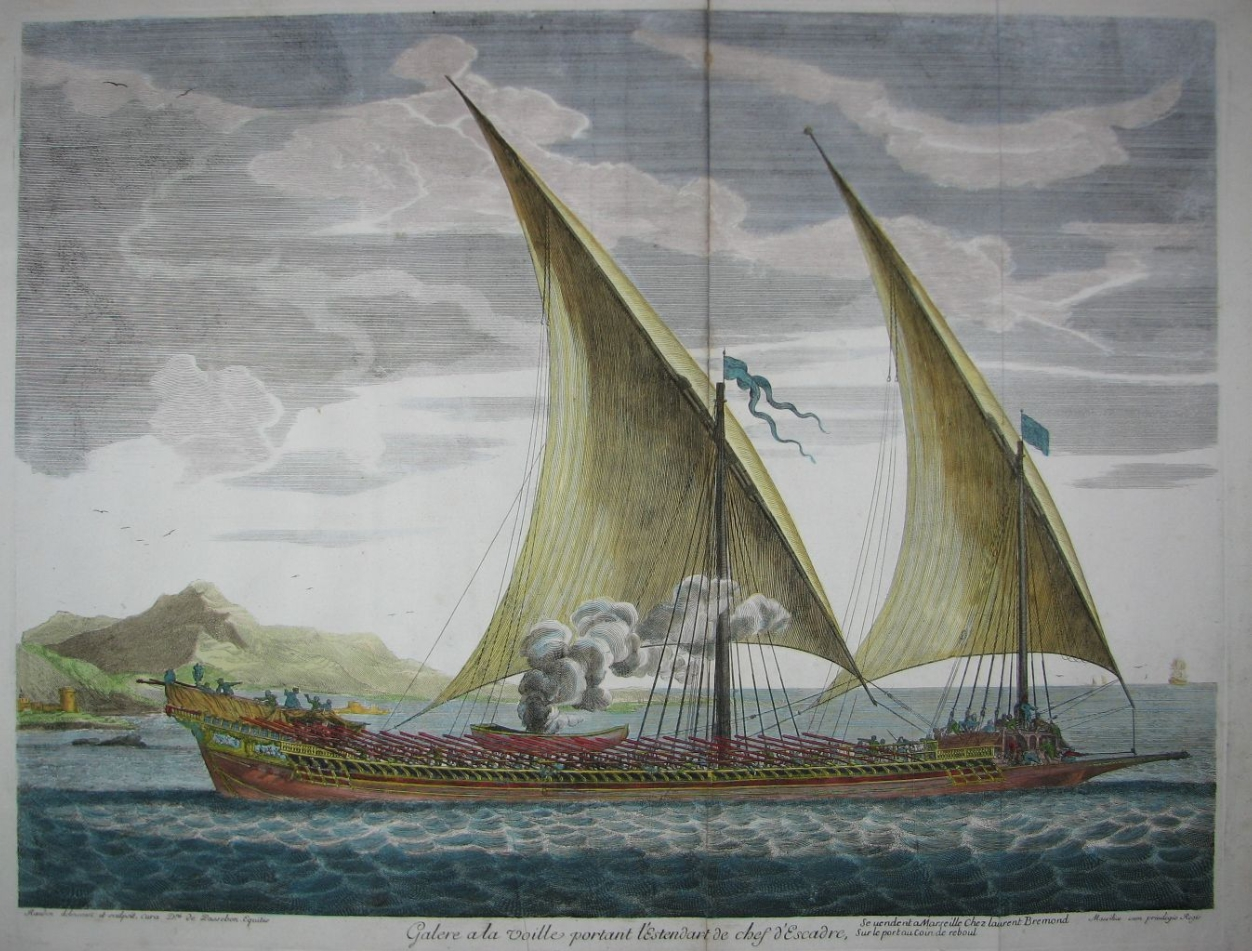
Colourised engraving of a French galley (27 pairs of oars) built according to the design that was standard in the Mediterranean from the early 17th century; Henri Sbonski de Passebon, 1690

A galley is a type of ship optimised for propulsion by oars. Galleys were historically used for warfare, trade, and piracy mostly in the seas surrounding Europe. It developed in the Mediterranean world during antiquity and continued to exist in various forms until the early 19th century. It typically had a long, slender hull, shallow draft, and often a low freeboard. Most types of galleys also had sails that could be used in favourable winds, but they relied primarily on oars to move independently of winds and currents or in battle. The term "galley" originates from the Ancient Greek word "galea" which was used to describe a narrow vessel with resemblance to the shape of a dogfish. It is believed the English form of the term came into use around 1300. It has occasionally been used for unrelated vessels with similar military functions as the galley but which were not Mediterranean in origin, such as medieval Scandinavian longships, 16th-century Acehnese ghalis and 18th-century North American gunboats.

Galleys were the primary warships used by the ancient Mediterranean naval powers, including the Phoenicians, Greeks and Romans. The galley remained the dominant type of vessel used for war and piracy in the Mediterranean Sea until the start of the early modern period. A final revival of galley warfare occurred during the 18th century in the Baltic Sea during the wars between Russia, Sweden, and Denmark. In the Mediterranean, they remained in use until the very end of the 18th century, and survived in part because of their prestige and association with chivalry and land warfare. In war, galleys were used in landing raids, as troop transports and were very effective in amphibious warfare. While they usually served in wars or for defense against piracy, galleys also served as trade vessels for high-priority or expensive goods up to the end of the Middle Ages. Its oars guaranteed that it could make progress where a sailing ship would have been becalmed, and its large crew could defend it against attacks from pirates and raiders. This also made it one of the safest and most reliable forms of passenger transport, especially for Christian pilgrims during the High and Late Middle Ages.

For naval combat, galleys were equipped with various weapons: rams and occasionally catapults until late antiquity, Greek fire during the Early Middle Ages, and cannons from the 15th century. However, they relied primarily on their large crews to overpower enemy vessels through boarding. Galleys were the first vessels to effectively use heavy gunpowder artillery against other ships and naval fortifications. Early 16th-century galleys had heavy guns in the bow which were aimed by manoeuvring the entire vessel. Initially, gun galleys posed a serious threat to sailing warships, but were gradually made obsolete by the development of full-rigged ships with superior broadside armament. Galleys were unsuitable in the wider ocean, far from land and bases of resupply. They had difficulty in rough weather. Their role as flexible cruisers and patrol craft in the Mediterranean was also taken over by xebecs and other oar-sail hybrids.

Oars on ancient galleys were usually arranged in 15–30 pairs, from monoremes with a single line of oars to triremes with three lines of oars in a tiered arrangement. Occasionally, much larger polyremes had multiple rowers per oar and hundreds of rowers per galley. Ancient shipwrights built galleys using a labour-intensive, shell-first mortise and tenon technique up until the Early Middle Ages. It was gradually replaced by a less expensive skeleton-first carvel method. The rowing setup was also simplified and eventually developed into a system called alla sensile with up to three rowers sharing a single bench, handling one oar each. This was suitable for skilled, professional rowers. This was further simplified to the a scaloccio method with rowers sharing a bench but using just a single large oar, sometimes with up to seven or more rowers per oar in the very largest war galleys. This method was more suitable for the use of forced labour, both galley slaves and convicts. Most galleys were equipped with sails that could be used when the wind was favourable: basic square sails until the Early Middle Ages and later lateen sails.

== Etymology ==
The word galley has been attested in English from about 1300. Variants of the same term were established in many other European languages from around 1500 both as a general term for oared warships or more specifically for the Mediterranean-style vessel. (Note: See for example: "galär". Svenska Akademiens ordbok [The Swedish Academy's dictionary] (in Swedish); "galei". Woordenboek der Nederlandsche Taal [Dictionary of the Dutch Language] (in Dutch); Wolfgang Pfeifer; et al. (1993). "Galeere". Etymologisches Wörterbuch des Deutschen [Etymologisches Dictionary of German] (in German); Pryor 1988, p., "galeja".) The term derives from the Medieval Greek galea, a smaller version of the dromon, the prime warship of the Byzantine navy. The origin of the Greek word is unclear but could possibly be related to galeos, the Greek word for dogfish shark.

== Terminology ==
Throughout history, there has been a wide variety of terms used for different types of galleys. In modern historical literature, a galley is defined as a vessel relying primarily on oars, but which can also use sails when necessary, and which developed in the Mediterranean. "Galley" is also occasionally used as a generic term for any type of oared vessels that are larger than boats and with similar functions but which are built according to other shipbuilding traditions.

It was only from the Late Middle Ages that a unified galley concept started to come into use. Ancient galleys were named according to the number of oars, the number of banks of oars or rows of rowers. The terms are based on contemporary language use combined with recent compounds of Greek and Latin words. The earliest Greek single-banked (Note: The meaning of the word "banked", as in "single banked", "double banked" is different in the context of galleys from the propulsion of small boats by oar. See Rowing#Forward-facing systems for an explanation of the small boat terminology.) galleys are called triaconters (from triakontoroi, "thirty-oars") and penteconters (pentēkontoroi, "fifty-oars"). For later galleys with more than one bank of oars, the terminology is based on Latin numerals with the suffix -reme from rēmus, "oar". A monoreme has one bank of oars, a bireme two, and a trireme three. A human-powered oared vessel is not practically feasible as four or more oars to a bank will either interfere with each other, or be too high above the waterline to be practicable. In describing galleys, any number higher than three did not refer to banks of oars, but to additional rowers per oar. Quinquereme (quintus + rēmus) was literally a "five-oar", but actually meant that there were more than one rower per oar in a bireme or trireme arrangement. For simplicity, many modern scholars refer to these as "fives", "sixes", "eights", "elevens", etc. Anything above six or seven rows of rowers was uncommon, but even an entirely unique "forty" has been attested from the 3rd century BC. Any galley with more than three or four lines of rowers is often referred to as a "polyreme".

Medieval and early modern galleys were described based on the changing designs that evolved after the ancient designs and rowing arrangement had been forgotten. Among the most important is the Byzantine dromon, the predecessor to the Italian galea sottile, the final form of the Mediterranean war galley. As galleys became an integral part of an advanced, early modern system of warfare and state administration, they were divided into a number of ranked grades based on the size of the vessel and the number of its crew. The most basic types were the large commander "lantern galleys", half-galleys, galiots, fustas, brigantines, and fregatas. Naval historian Jan Glete has described these as a sort of predecessor of the later rating system of the Royal Navy and other sailing fleets in Northern Europe.

=== Similar oared vessels ===
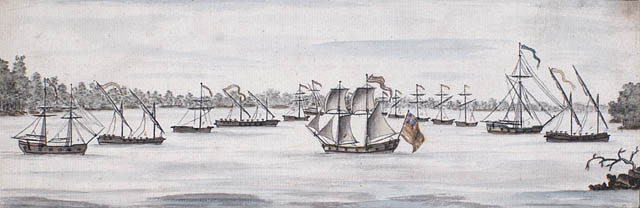
United States ships at the Battle of Valcour Island depicting several "row galleys" similar in function but based on very different designs from Mediterranean galleys; watercolour by Charles Randle

Classicist Lionel Casson has applied the term "galley" to oared Viking ships of the Early and High Middle Ages, both their well known longship warships and their less familiar merchant galleys. Oared military vessels built on the British Isles in the 11th to 13th centuries were based on Scandinavian designs, but were referred to as "galleys" because of the similarity in function. Many of them were similar to birlinns (a smaller version of the Highland galley), close relatives of longship types like the snekkja. By the 14th century, they were replaced with balingers in southern Britain while longship-type Highland and Irish galleys and birlinns remained in use throughout the Middle Ages in northern Britain.

The French navy and the Royal Navy built a series of "galley frigates" from around 1670–1690 that were small two-decked sailing cruisers with a single row of oarports on the lower deck, close to the waterline. The three British galley frigates also had distinctive names – James Galley, Charles Galley, and Mary Galley. In the late 18th century, the term "galley" was sometimes used to describe small oared gun-armed vessels. In North America, during the American Revolutionary War and other wars with France and Britain, the early US Navy and the navies they fought built vessels that were referred to "galleys" or "row galleys". These are today best described as brigantines or Baltic-style gunboats. The North American "galleys" were classified based on their military role, and in part due to technicalities in administration and naval financing. In the latter part of the 19th century, the Royal Navy term for the gig (Note: A gig is a type of ship's boat optimised for propulsion by oar) reserved for the captain's use was "galley" even though it was issued to the ship by the navy dockyard as a "gig".

== Early history ==
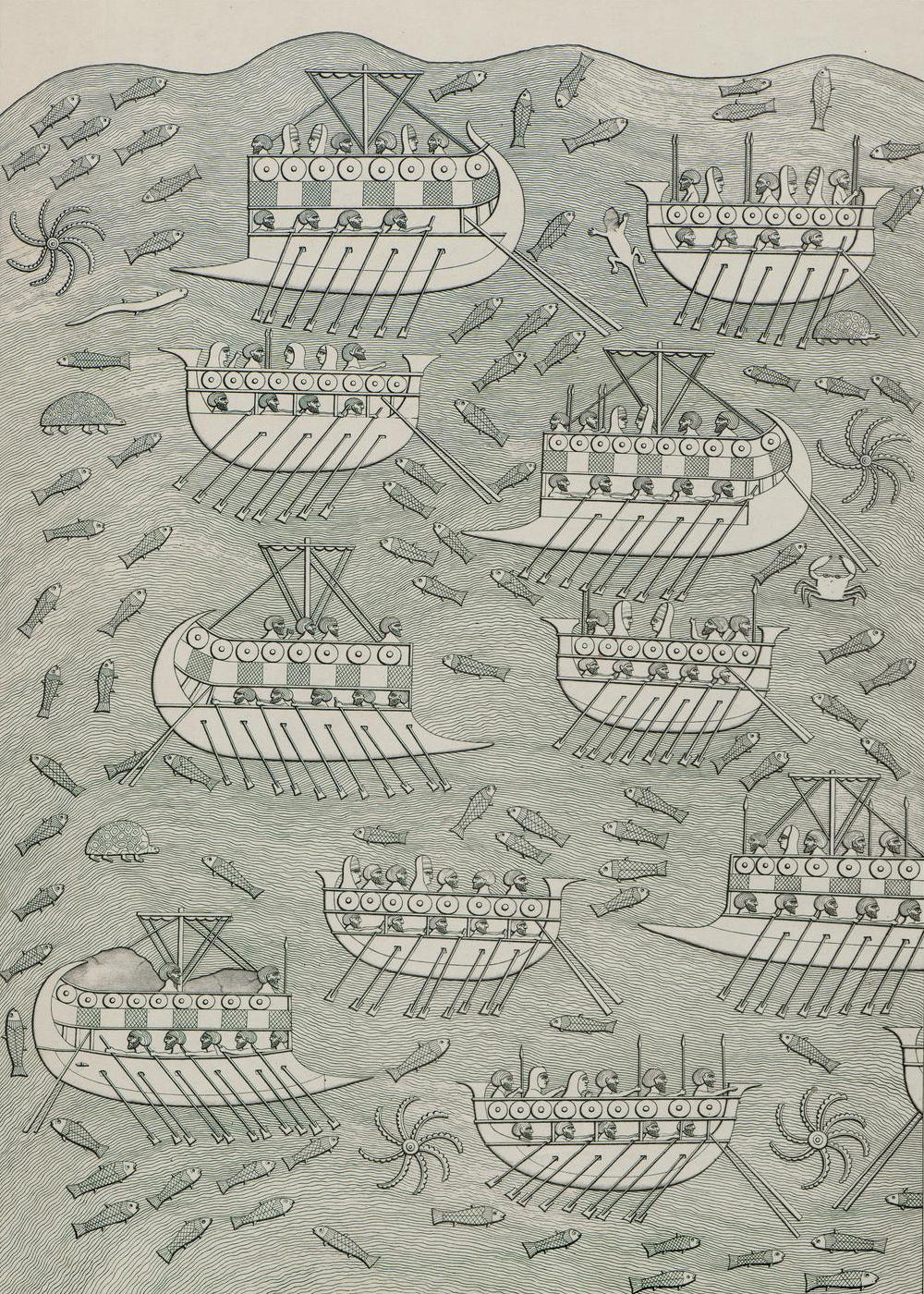
Drawing of warships (pointed bows) and trade ships (rounded bows); based on a wall relief from the Southwest Palace at Nineveh, circa 700 BC.

Among the earliest known watercraft were canoes made from hollowed-out logs, the earliest ancestors of galleys. Their narrow hulls required them to be paddled in a fixed sitting position facing forward, a less efficient form of propulsion than rowing with proper oars, facing backward. Seagoing paddled craft have been attested by finds of terracotta sculptures and lead models in the region of the Aegean Sea from the 3rd millennium BC. However, archaeologists believe that the Stone Age colonization of islands in the Mediterranean around 8,000 BC required larger seaworthy vessels that were paddled and possibly even equipped with sails. The first evidence of more complex craft considered prototypes for later galleys comes from Ancient Egypt during the Old Kingdom (about 2700–2200 BC). Under the rule of pharaoh Pepi I (2332–2283 BC) these vessels were used to transport troops to raid settlements along the Levantine coast and to ship back slaves and timber. During the reign of Hatshepsut (about 1479–1457 BC), Egyptian galleys traded in luxuries on the Red Sea with the enigmatic Land of Punt, as recorded on wall paintings at the Mortuary Temple of Hatshepsut at Deir el-Bahari.

The first Greek galley-like ships appeared around the second half of the 2nd millennium BC. In the epic poem, the Iliad, set in the 12th century BC, oared vessels with a single row of oarmen were used primarily to transport soldiers between land battles. The first recorded naval battle occurred as early as 1175 BC, the Battle of the Delta between Egyptian forces under Ramesses III and the enigmatic alliance known as the Sea Peoples. It is the first known engagement between organized armed forces using sea vessels as weapons of war, though primarily as fighting platforms.

The Phoenicians were among the most significant naval civilizations in early classical antiquity, but little detailed evidence has been found of what kind of ships they used. The best depictions found so far have been small, highly stylized images on seals which illustrate crescent-shaped vessels equipped with a single mast and bank of oars. Colorful frescoes at the Minoan settlement on Santorini (about 1600 BC) depict vessels with tents arranged in a ceremonial procession. Some of the vessels are rowed, but others are paddled. This has been interpreted as a possible ritual reenactment of more ancient types of vessels, alluding to a time before rowing was invented. Little is otherwise known about the use and design of Minoan ships.

Mediterranean galleys from around the 9th century BC typically had 15 and 25 pairs of oars ("triaconters" and "penteconters", respectively) with just one level of oars on each side, or "monoremes". Sometime during the 8th century BC the first bireme galleys were built by adding a second level of rowers, one level above the other. This created a second bank of oars, adding more propulsion power with the same length of hull. It made galleys faster, more maneuverable and sturdier. Phoenician shipbuilders were likely the first to build two-level galleys, and bireme designs were soon adopted and further developed by the Greeks. A third bank of oar was added by attaching an outrigger to a bireme. The outrigger was a projecting frame that gave additional leverage for a third rower to handle an oar efficiently. It has been hypothesized that early forms of three-banked ships may have existed as early as 700 BC, but the earliest conclusive written reference dates to 542 BC. These new galleys were called triērēs (literally "three-fitted") in Greek. (Note: The corresponding Greek term for a two-banked galley,diērēs ("two-fitted") is not attested until the 2nd century AD as a back-dated Greek adaptation of the Latin term.) Romans later applied the term triremis which is the origin of "trireme" and the name used most commonly today.

== Trade and travel ==
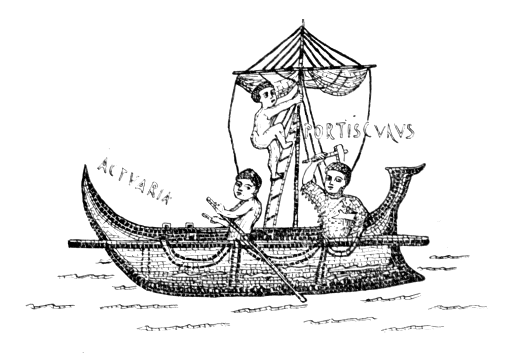
3rd-century depiction of an actuaria from the Altiburus mosaic. A figure is beating the time for the rowers with a mallet.

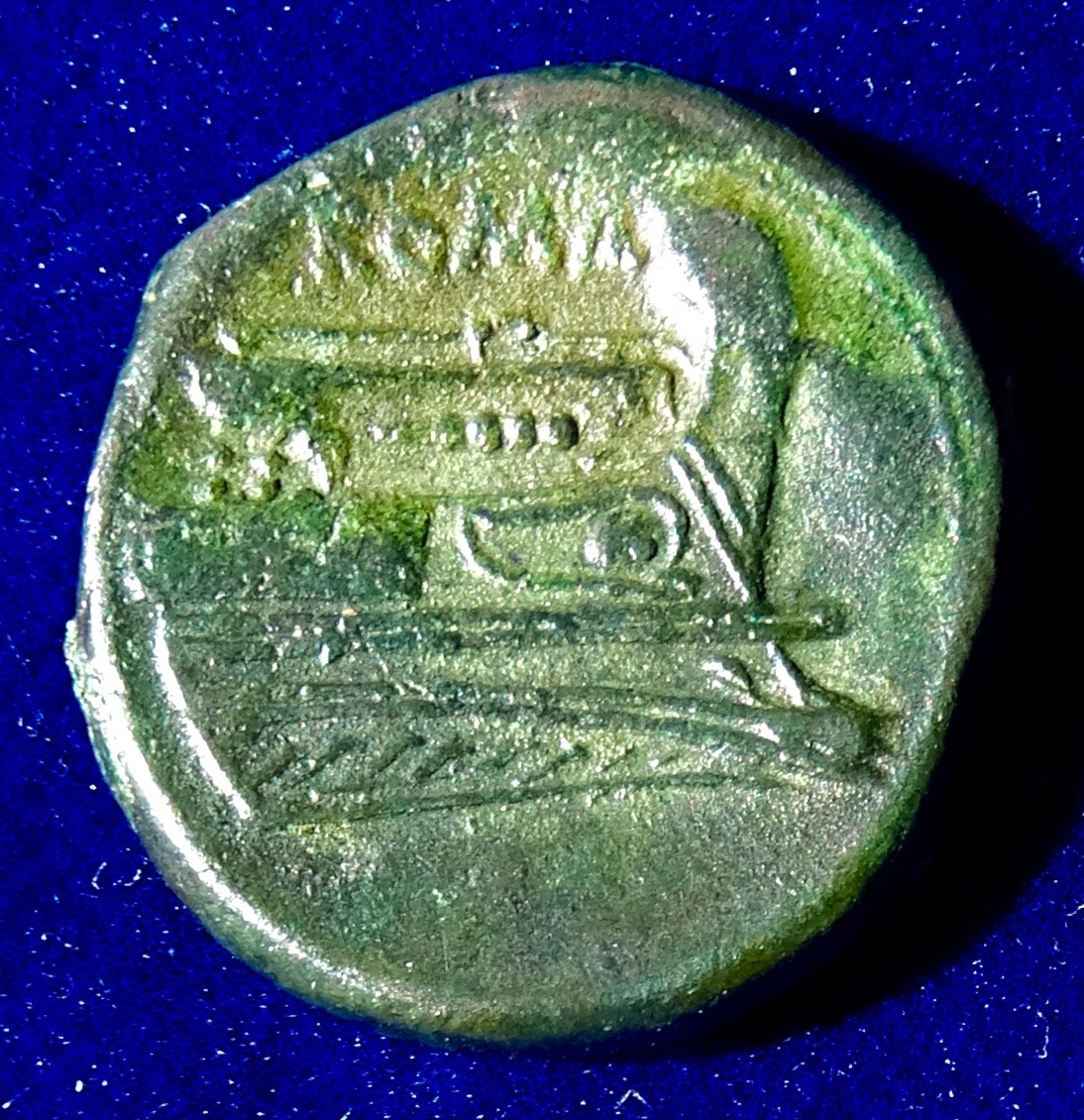
The prow of a galley on a coin of the Roman Republic of the 3rd century BC

Until at least the late 2nd century BC, there was no clear distinction between ships of trade and war other than how they were used. River boats plied the waterways of ancient Egypt during the Old Kingdom (2700–2200 BC) and seagoing galley-like vessels were recorded bringing back luxuries from across the Red Sea in the reign of pharaoh Hatshepsut. When rams or cutwaters were fitted to the bows of warships sometime around 700 BC, it resulted in a more distinct split between warships and trade ships. Phoenicians used galleys for trade that were less elongated, carried fewer oars and relied more on sails. Carthaginian trade galley wrecks found off Sicily that date to the 3rd or 2nd century BC had a length to breadth ratio of 6:1, proportions that fell between the 4:1 of sailing merchant ships and the 8:1 or 10:1 of war galleys.

Most of the surviving documentary evidence comes from Greek and Roman shipping, though it is likely that merchant galleys all over the Mediterranean were highly similar. In Greek they were referred to as histiokopos ("sail-oar-er") to reflect that they relied on both types of propulsion. In Latin they were called actuaria (navis), "(ship) that moves", stressing that they were capable of making progress regardless of weather conditions. As an example of the speed and reliability, during an instance of the famous "Carthago delenda est" speech, Cato the Elder demonstrated the close proximity of the Roman arch enemy Carthage by displaying a fresh fig to his audience that he claimed had been picked in North Africa only three days past. Other cargoes carried by galleys were honey, cheese, meat, and live animals intended for gladiator combat. The Romans had several types of merchant galleys that specialized in various tasks, out of which the actuaria with up to 50 rowers was the most versatile, including the phaselus (lit. "bean pod") for passenger transport and the lembus, a small-scale express carrier. Many of these designs continued to be used until the Middle Ages.

After the fall of the Western Roman Empire around the 5th century AD, the old Mediterranean economy collapsed and the volume of trade went down drastically. The Eastern Roman Empire neglected to revive overland trade routes, but was dependent on keeping the sea lanes open to keep the empire together. In 600–750 AD bulk trade declined while luxury trade increased. Galleys remained in service, but were profitable mainly in the luxury trade, which set off their high maintenance cost. In the 10th century, there was a sharp increase in piracy which resulted in larger trade ships with more numerous crews. These were mostly built by the growing maritime republics of Italy which were emerging as the dominant sea powers, including Venice, Genoa, and Pisa. Their merchant galleys were similar to dromons, but without heavy weapons and both faster and wider. The largest types were used by Venice, based on galley types like the pamphylon and chelandion. They had tower-like superstructures and could be manned by crews of up to 1,000 men and could be employed in warfare when required. A further boost to the development of the large merchant galleys was the increase in Western European pilgrims traveling to the Holy Land. In Northern Europe, Viking longships and their derivations, knarrs, dominated trading and shipping. They functioned and were propelled similar to the Mediterranean galleys, but developed from a separate building tradition.

Animated 3D model of the basic hull structure of a Venetian "galley of Flanders", a large trading vessel of the 15th century. The reconstruction by archaeologist Courtney Higgins is based on measurements given in contemporary ship treatises.

In the Mediterranean, merchant galleys continued to be used during the High and Late Middle Ages, even as sailing vessels evolved more efficient hulls and rigging. The zenith in the design of merchant galleys came with the state-owned "great galleys" of the Venetian Republic, first built in the 1290s. The great galleys were in all respects larger than contemporary war galleys (up to 46 m) and had a deeper draft, with more room for cargo (140–250 tonnes). With a full complement of rowers ranging from 150 to 180 men, all available to defend the ship from attack, they were also very safe modes of travel. This attracted a business of carrying rich pilgrims to the Holy Land, a trip that could be accomplished in as little 29 days on the route Venice–Jaffa, despite landfalls for rest and watering, or to shelter from rough weather. Later routes linked ports around the Mediterranean, between the Mediterranean and the Black Sea, and between the Mediterranean and Bruges. In 1447 Florentine galleys could stop at as many as 14 ports on their way to and from Alexandria in Egypt.

== Ancient and medieval warfare ==
The earliest use for galleys in warfare was to ferry fighters from one place to another, and until the middle of the 2nd millennium BC had no real distinction from merchant freighters. Around the 14th century BC, the first dedicated fighting ships were developed, sleeker and with cleaner lines than the bulkier merchants. They were used for raiding, capturing merchants and for dispatches. During this early period, raiding became the most important form of organized violence in the Mediterranean region. Casson used the example of Homer's works to show that seaborne raiding was considered a common and legitimate occupation among ancient maritime peoples. The later Athenian historian Thucydides described it as having been "without stigma" before his time.

The development of the ram sometime before the 8th century BC changed the nature of naval warfare, which had until then been a matter of boarding and hand-to-hand fighting. With a heavy projection at the foot of the bow, sheathed with metal, usually bronze, a ship could incapacitate an enemy ship by punching a hole in its planking. The relative speed and nimbleness of ships became important, since a slower ship could be outmaneuvered and disabled by a faster one. The earliest designs had only one row of rowers that sat in undecked hulls, rowing against thole pins, or oarports, that were placed directly along the railings. The practical upper limit for wooden constructions fast and maneuverable enough for warfare was around 25–30 oars per side. By adding another level of oars, a development that occurred no later than c. 750 BC, the galley could be made shorter with as many rowers, while making them strong enough to be effective ramming weapons.

The emergence of more advanced states and intensified competition between them spurred on the development of advanced galleys with multiple banks of rowers. During the middle of the first millennium BC, the Mediterranean powers developed successively larger and more complex vessels, the most advanced being the classical trireme with up to 170 rowers. Triremes fought several important engagements in the naval battles of the Greco-Persian Wars (502–449 BC) and the Peloponnesian War (431–404 BC), including the Battle of Aegospotami in 405 BC, which sealed the defeat of Athens by Sparta and its allies. The trireme was an advanced ship that was expensive to build and to maintain due its large crew. By the 5th century, advanced war galleys had been developed that required sizable states with an advanced economy to build and maintain. It was associated with the latest in warship technology around the 4th century BC and could only be employed by an advanced state with an advanced economy and administration. They required considerable skill to row and oarsmen were mostly free citizens who had years of experience at the oar.

=== Hellenistic era and rise of the Republic ===
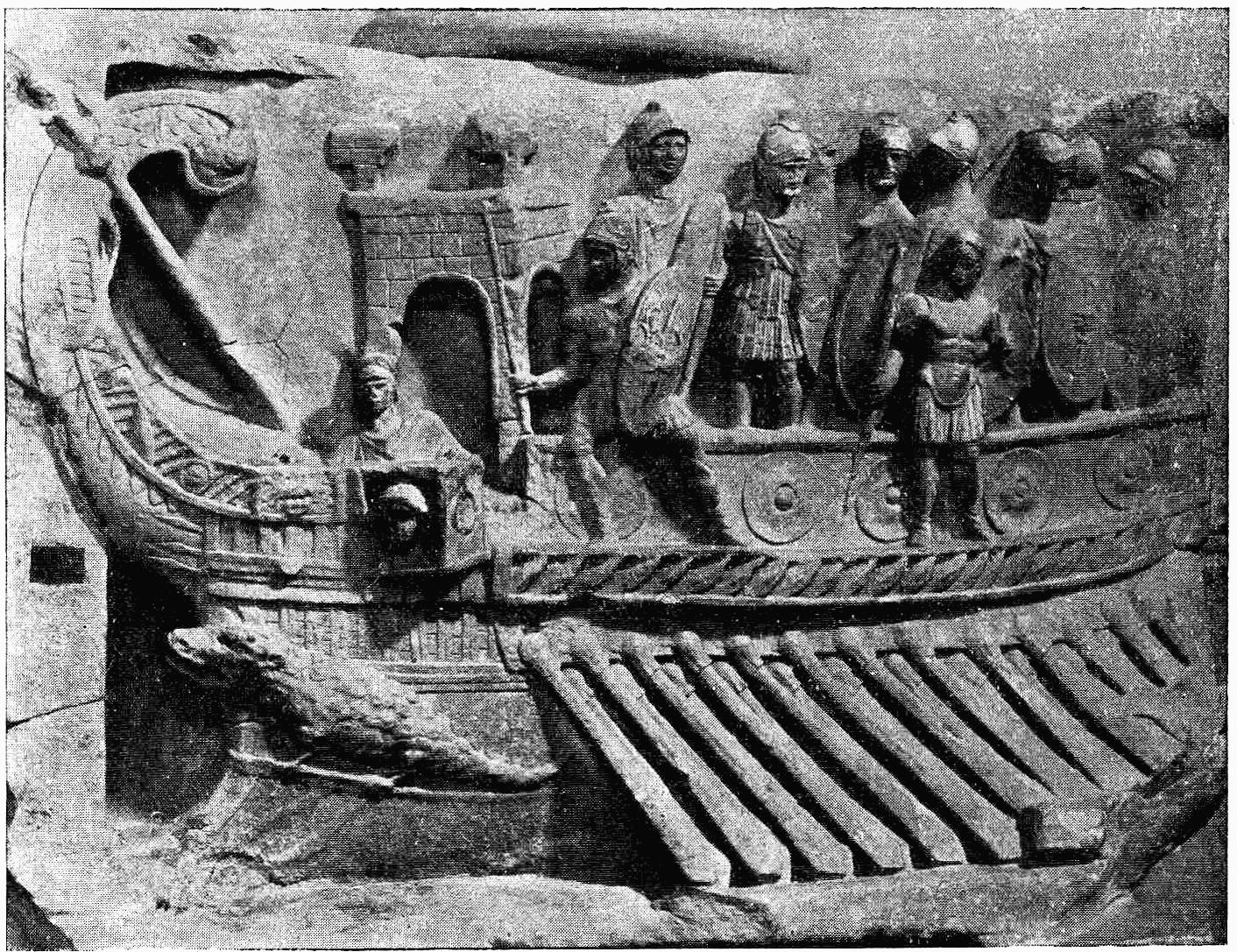
A Roman naval bireme in a relief from the Temple of Fortuna Primigenia in Praeneste, built c. 120 BC (Museo Pio-Clementino)

As civilizations around the Mediterranean grew in size and complexity, both their navies and the galleys that made up their numbers became successively larger. The basic design of two or three rows of oars remained the same, but more rowers were added to each oar. The exact reasons are not known, but are believed to have been caused by addition of more troops and the use of more advanced ranged weapons on ships, such as catapults. The size of the new naval forces also made it difficult to find enough skilled rowers for the one-man-per-oar system of the earliest triremes. With more than one man per oar, a single rower could set the pace for the others to follow, meaning that more unskilled rowers could be employed.

The successor states of Alexander the Great's empire built galleys that were like triremes or biremes in oar layout, but manned with additional rowers for each oar. The ruler Dionysius I of Syracuse (c. 432–367 BC) is credited with pioneering the "five" and "six", meaning five or six rows of rowers plying two or three rows of oars. Ptolemy II (283–46 BC) is known to have built a large fleet of very large galleys with several experimental designs rowed by everything from 12 up to 40 rows of rowers, though most of these are considered to have been quite impractical. Fleets with large galleys were put in action in conflicts such as the Punic Wars (246–146 BC) between the Roman Republic and Carthage, which included massive naval battles with hundreds of vessels and tens of thousands of soldiers, seamen, and rowers.

=== Roman Imperial era ===
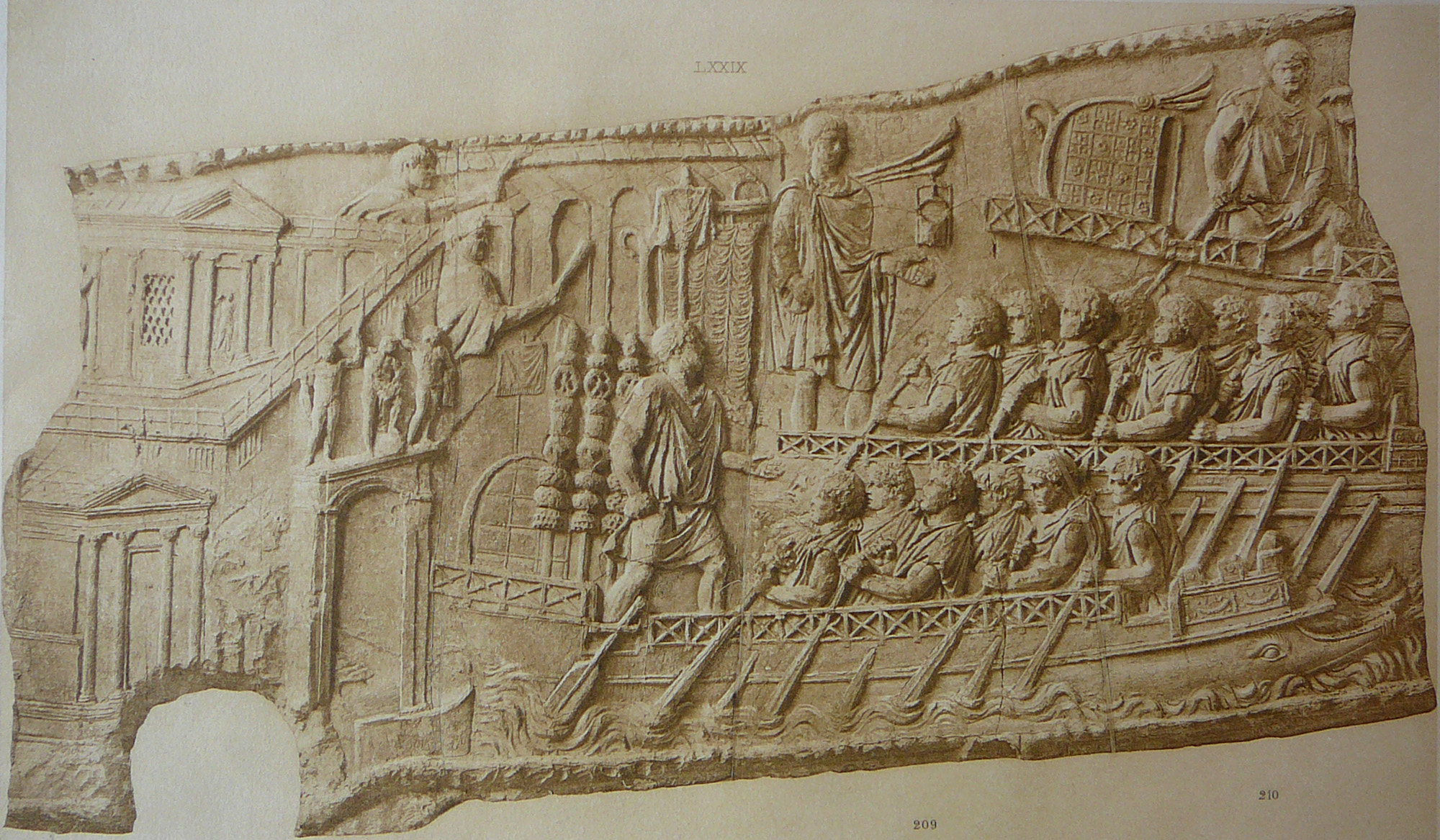
Two compact liburnians used by the Romans in the campaigns against the Dacians in the early 2nd century AD; relief from Trajan's Column, c. 113 AD

The Battle of Actium in 31 BC between the forces of Augustus and Mark Antony marked the peak of the Roman fleet arm. After Augustus' victory at Actium, most of the Roman fleet was dismantled and burned. The Roman civil wars were fought mostly by land forces, and from the 160s until the 4th century AD, no major fleet actions were recorded. During this time, most of the galley crews were disbanded or employed for entertainment purposes in mock battles or in handling the sail-like sun-screens in the larger Roman arenas. What fleets remained were treated as auxiliaries of the land forces, and galley crewmen themselves called themselves milites, "soldiers", rather than nautae, "sailors".

The Roman galley fleets were turned into provincial patrol forces that were smaller and relied largely on liburnians, compact biremes with 25 pairs of oars. These were named after an Illyrian tribe known by Romans for their sea roving practices, and these smaller craft were based on, or inspired by, their vessels of choice. The liburnians and other small galleys patrolled the rivers of continental Europe and reached as far as the Baltic, where they were used to fight local uprisings and assist in checking foreign invasions. The Romans maintained numerous bases around the empire: along the rivers of Central Europe, chains of forts along the northern European coasts and the British Isles, Mesopotamia, and North Africa, including Trabzon, Vienna, Belgrade, Dover, Seleucia, and Alexandria. Few actual galley battles in the provinces are found in records. One action in 70 AD at the unspecified location of the "Island of the Batavians" during the Batavian Rebellion was recorded, and included a trireme as the Roman flagship. The last provincial fleet, the classis Britannica, was reduced by the late 200s, though there was a minor upswing under the rule of Constantine (272–337). His rule also saw the last major naval battle of the unified Roman Empire (before the permanent split into Western and Eastern [later "Byzantine"] Empires), the Battle of the Hellespont of 324. Some time after the Battle of the Hellespont, the classical trireme fell out of use, and its design was forgotten.

=== Early and High Middle Ages ===
A transition from galley to sailing vessels as the most common types of warships began in the High Middle Ages (c. 11th century). Large high-sided sailing ships had always been formidable obstacles for galleys. To low-freeboard oared vessels, the bulkier sailing ships, the cog and the carrack, were almost like floating fortresses, being difficult to board and even harder to capture. Galleys remained useful as warships throughout the entire Middle Ages because of their maneuverability. Sailing ships of the time had only one mast, usually with just a single, large square sail. This made them cumbersome to steer. Though equipped to beat to windward, their performance at this would have been limited. Galleys were therefore important for coastal raiding and amphibious landings, both key elements of medieval warfare.

In the eastern Mediterranean, the Byzantine Empire struggled with the incursion from invading Muslim Arabs from the 7th century, leading to fierce competition, a buildup of fleet, and war galleys of increasing size. Soon after conquering Egypt and the Levant, the Arab rulers built ships highly similar to Byzantine dromons with the help of local Coptic shipwrights from former Byzantine naval bases. By the 9th century, the struggle between the Byzantines and Arabs had turned the Eastern Mediterranean into a no-man's land for merchant activity. In the 820s Crete was captured by Al-Andalus Muslims who had fled a failed revolt against the Emirate of Cordoba, turning the island into a base for (galley) attacks on Christian shipping until the island was recaptured by the Byzantines in 960.

In the western Mediterranean and Atlantic, the division of the Carolingian Empire in the late 9th century brought on a period of instability, meaning increased piracy and raiding in the Mediterranean, particularly by newly arrived Muslim invaders. The situation was worsened by raiding Scandinavian Vikings who used longships, vessels that in many ways were very close to galleys in design and functionality and also employed similar tactics. To counter the threat, local rulers began to build large oared vessels, some with up to 30 pairs of oars, that were larger, faster, and with higher sides than Viking ships. Scandinavian expansion, including incursions into the Mediterranean and attacks on both Muslim Iberia and even Constantinople itself, subsided by the mid-11th century. By this time, greater stability in merchant traffic was achieved by the emergence of Christian kingdoms such as those of France, Hungary, and Poland. Around the same time, Italian port towns and city states, like Venice, Pisa, and Amalfi, rose on the fringes of the Byzantine Empire as it struggled with eastern threats.

=== Late Middle Ages ===
Late medieval maritime warfare was divided in two distinct regions. In the Mediterranean galleys were used for raiding along coasts, and in the constant fighting for naval bases. In the Atlantic and Baltic there was greater focus on sailing ships that were used mostly for troop transport, with galleys providing fighting support. Galleys were still widely used in the north and were the most numerous warships used by Mediterranean powers with interests in the north, especially France, the Iberian kingdoms and the Italian merchant republics. The kings of France operated the Clos de Galées (literally "galley enclosure") in Rouen during the 14th and 15th century where they had southern-style war galleys built . The Clos was built by Genoese in 1298 and they continued to dominate shipbuilding there until its destruction in 1419 so that they wouldn't fall into English hands.

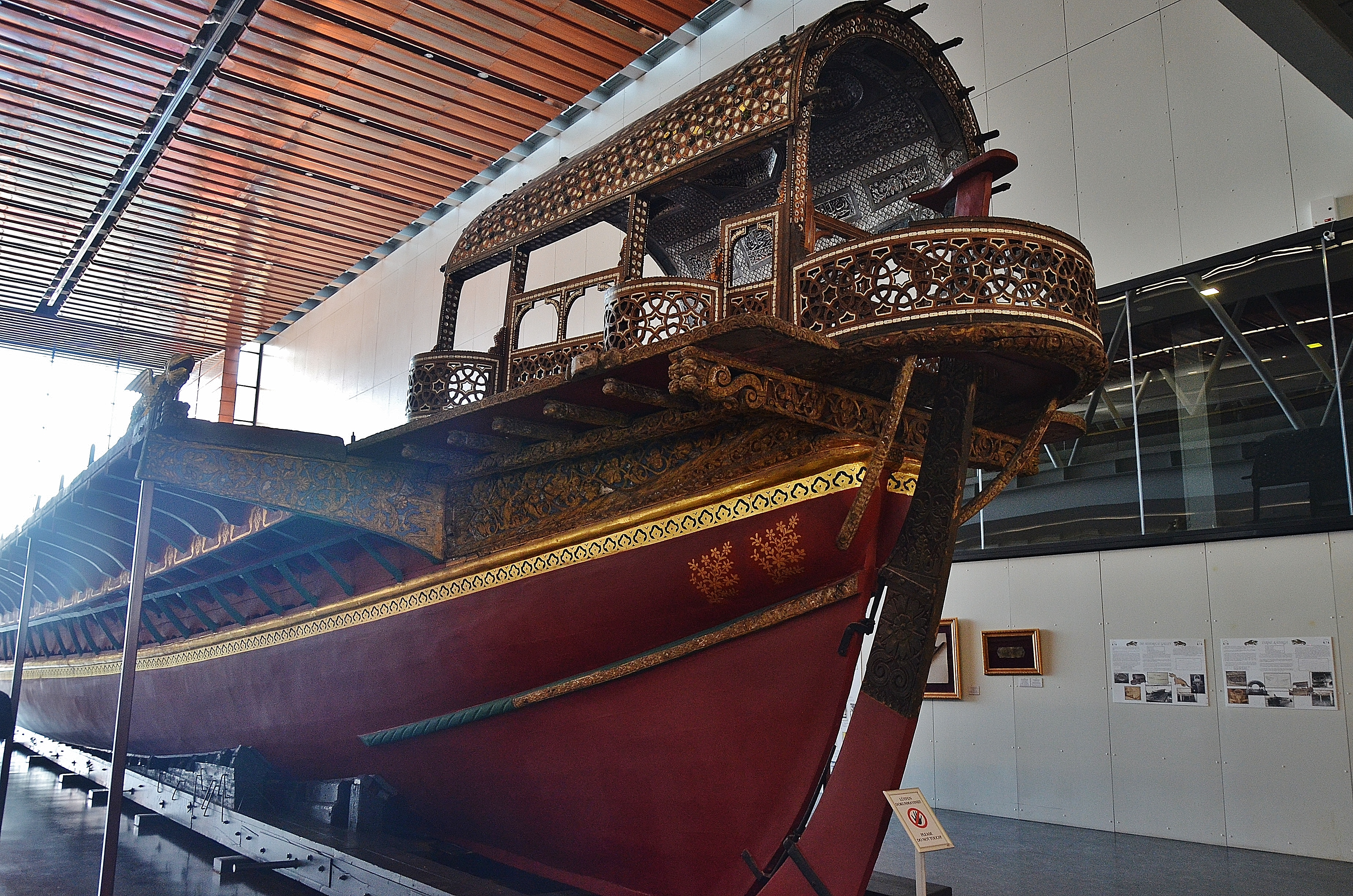
A view of the stern showing the ornamented kiosk of a kadırga of the Ottoman Navy, the only surviving original galley in the world (Istanbul Naval Museum)

During the 13th and 14th century, the galley evolved into the design that was to remain essentially the same until it was phased out in the early 19th century. The new type descended from the ships used by Byzantine and Muslim fleets in the Early Middle Ages. These were the mainstay of all Christian powers until the 14th century, including the great maritime republics of Genoa and Venice, the Papacy, the Hospitallers, Aragon, and Castile, as well as by various pirates and corsairs. The overall term used for these types of vessels was gallee sottili ("slender galleys"). The later Ottoman Navy used similar designs, but they were generally faster under sail, and smaller, but slower under oars. Galley designs were intended solely for close action with hand-held weapons and projectile weapons like bows and crossbows. In the 13th century the Iberian Crown of Aragon built several fleet of galleys (known as Catalan galleys) with high castles, manned with Catalan crossbowmen, and regularly defeated numerically superior Angevin forces.

=== Transition to sailing ships ===
During the early 15th century, sailing ships began to dominate naval warfare in northern waters. A Castilian naval raid on the island of Jersey in 1405 employed a naval force consisting mostly of cogs or carracks, rather than the oared-powered galleys. The Battle of Gibraltar between Castile and Portugal in 1476 was another important sign of change; it was the first recorded battle where the primary combatants were full-rigged ships armed with wrought-iron guns on the upper decks and in the waists, foretelling of the slow decline of the war galley.

The sailing vessel was always at the mercy of the wind for propulsion, and those that did carry oars were placed at a disadvantage because they were not optimized for oar use. The galley did have disadvantages compared to the sailing vessel though. Their smaller hulls were not able to hold as much cargo and this limited their range as the crews were required to replenish food stuffs more frequently. The low freeboard of the galley meant that in close action with a sailing vessel, the sailing vessel would usually maintain a height advantage. The sailing vessel could also fight more effectively farther out at sea and in rougher wind conditions because of the height of their freeboard.

Under sail, an oared warship was placed at much greater risk as a result of the piercings for the oars which were required to be near the waterline and would allow water to ingress into the galley if the vessel heeled too far to one side. These advantages and disadvantages led the galley to be and remain a primarily coastal vessel. The shift to sailing vessels in the Mediterranean was the result of the negation of some of the galley's advantages as well as the adoption of gunpowder weapons on a much larger institutional scale. The sailing vessel was propelled in a different manner than the galley but the tactics were often the same until the 16th century. The real-estate afforded to the sailing vessel to place larger cannons and other armament mattered little because early gunpowder weapons had limited range and were expensive to produce. The eventual creation of cast iron cannons allowed vessels and armies to be outfitted much more cheaply. The cost of gunpowder also fell in this period.

The armament of both vessel types varied between larger weapons such as bombards and the smaller swivel guns. For logistical purposes it became convenient for those with larger shore establishments to standardize upon a given size of cannon. Traditionally the English in the North and the Venetians in the Mediterranean are seen as some the earliest to move in this direction. The improving sail rigs of northern vessels also allowed them to navigate in the coastal waters of the Mediterranean to a much larger degree than before. Aside from warships the decrease in the cost of gunpowder weapons also led to the arming of merchants. The larger vessels of the north continued to mature while the galley retained its defining characteristics. Attempts were made to stave this off such as the addition of fighting castles in the bow, but such additions to counter the threats brought by larger sailing vessels often offset the advantages of galley.

Attempts to combine the advantages of both rowing and sailing ships were done in the 16th century, resulting in galleasses. Despite their common name, their different types entailed different to one or another design. Venetian galleasses were particularly large and powerful galleys with hulls more akin to sailing ships, while in turn, Spanish Atlantic galleasses were essentially sailing ships fitted with a line of rows, which would be used strategically to assist maneuver and sprint while in battle.

== Early modern war galleys ==
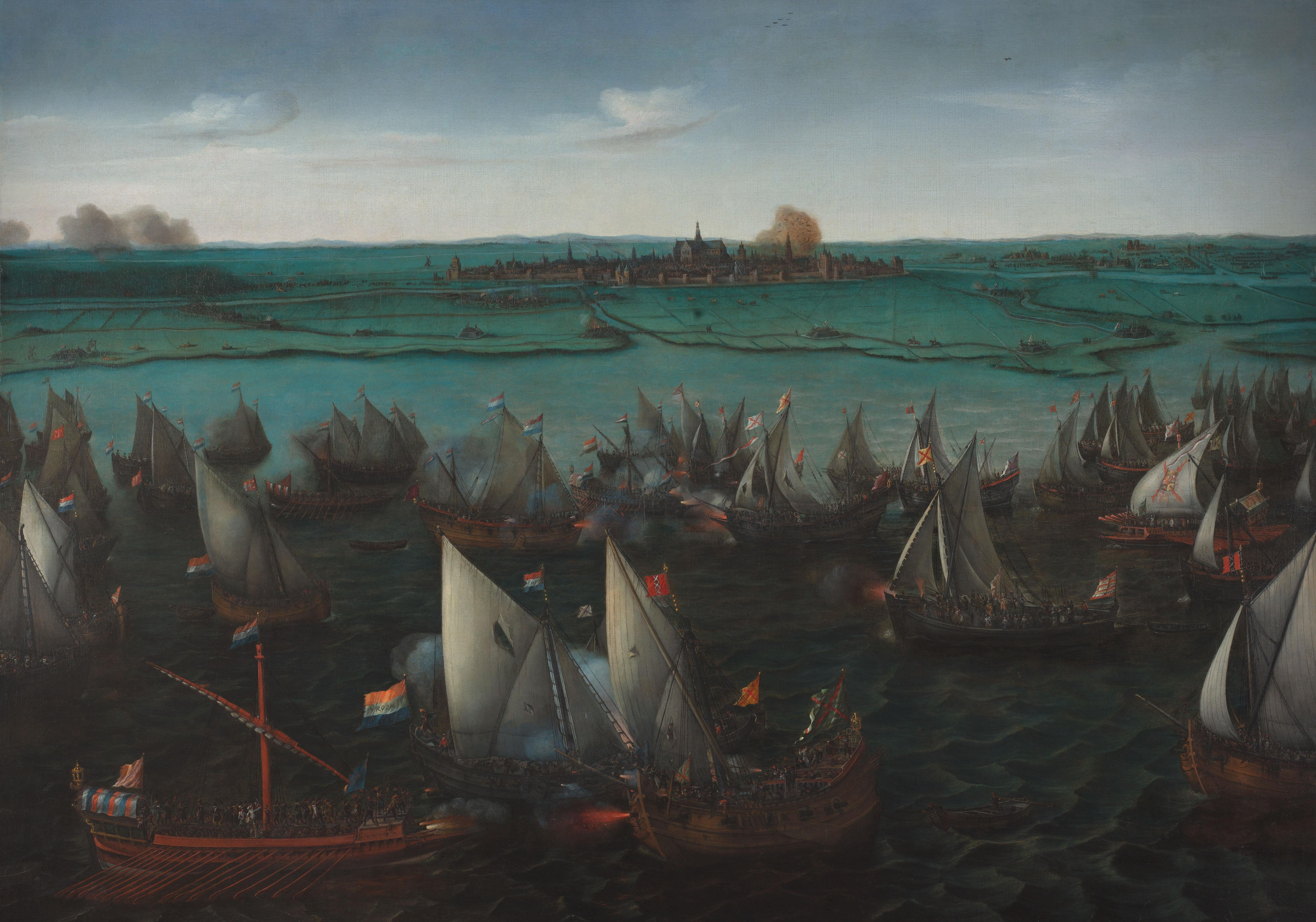
Battle between Dutch and Spanish Ships on the Haarlemmermeer in 1573, as painted in 1629 by Hendrick Cornelisz Vroom

From around 1450, three major naval powers established a dominance over different parts of the Mediterranean, using galleys as their primary weapons at sea: the Ottomans in the east, Venice in the center and Habsburg Spain in the west. The core of their fleets were concentrated in the three major, wholly dependable naval bases in the Mediterranean: Constantinople, Venice, and Barcelona.

The main difference between the Christan and Ottoman galley navies laid on quality against quantity. Western galley squads proved tactically superior, as noted in both Spanish and Turkish sources, but in turn, Constantinople could put out immense numbers of ships and crews. In 1564, García de Toledo wrote in his report that Christians could only trust on mobile attacks rather than seeking frontal battle. Major encounters involved necessarily alliances between Venice, Spain and the Spanish satellites in Italy in order to match the Ottoman naval potency. This created an uniquely unequal relationship, as Venice depended on Spain and its allies for defense against Ottoman expansionism, but would rarely help them in the opposite case.

Naval warfare in the 16th-century Mediterranean was fought mostly on smaller scale, with raiding and minor actions dominating. Ottoman Barbary corsairs launched attacks on lightly defended coastal settlements, while the Christian Knights Hospitaller against politically relevant targets in the Levant. Only three truly major fleet engagements were actually fought in the 16th century: the battles of Preveza in 1538, Djerba in 1560, and Lepanto in 1571. Lepanto became the last large all-galley battle ever, and was also one of the largest battle in sheer number of participants in early modern Europe before the Napoleonic Wars.

=== Spanish galley fleet ===
Spain maintained four permanent galley squadrons to guard its coasts and trade routes against the Ottomans, the French, and their corsairs. Together they formed the largest stable galley navy in the Mediterranean in the early 17th century. They were the backbone of the Spanish Mediterranean war fleet and were used for ferrying troops, supplies, horses, and munitions to Spain's Italian and African possessions. Galleys were also fielded in conjunction with sailing ships like galleons and carracks, such as in the relief of Coron, where their Genoese admiral Andrea Doria used galleys to assist his sailing ships in lack of wind. The Spanish also used galley forces for conflicts outside the Mediterranean, including deployments in their colonial possessions in the Caribbean and the Philippines to hunt pirates, and sporadically used them in the Netherlands and the Bay of Biscay. Their admiral Álvaro de Bazán the Elder also designed and built Atlantic galleasses, essentially galleons with rows, to hunt down pirates and foreign privateers.

Spain also sent galley squadrons to the Netherlands during the Eighty Years' War which successfully operated against Dutch forces in the enclosed, shallow coastal waters. From the late 1560s, galleys were also used to transport silver to Genoese bankers to finance Spanish troops against the Dutch uprising. Mediterranean galleasses and galleys were part of an invasion force of over 16,000 men under Álvaro de Bazán the Younger that conquered the Azores in 1583. During this conquest, captain Diego de Medrano is noted for innovating naval warfare techniques by enhancing the design of his galleys, becoming the first person to successfully cross the ocean with this type of galley. Around 2,000 galley rowers under the command of Medrano were on board ships of the famous 1588 Spanish Armada, though few of these actually made it to the battle itself.

At the end of the 17th century, galleys called periaguas were fielded to deal with foreign pirates and privateers in Spanish Caribbean. Spanish privateers specialized in countering piracy, the guarda costa, used periaguas to chase their sailing ships against the wind or to conduct night attacks on them.

=== Southeast Asia ===
Ottoman galleys contested the Portuguese intrusion in the Indian Ocean in the 16th century, but failed against the high-sided, massive Portuguese carracks in open waters. Even though the carracks themselves were soon surpassed by other types of sailing vessels, their greater range, great size, and high superstructures, armed with numerous wrought iron guns easily outmatched the short-ranged, low-freeboard Turkish galleys. In Southeast Asia during the 16th and early 17th century, the Aceh Sultanate had fleets of up to 100 native galley-like vessels (ghali) as well as smaller rowed vessels, there were described by Europeans as lancarans, galliots, and fustas. Some of the larger vessels were very large with heavier armament than standard Mediterranean galleys, with raised platforms for infantry and some with stern structures similar in height to that of contemporary galleons.

=== Introduction of guns ===
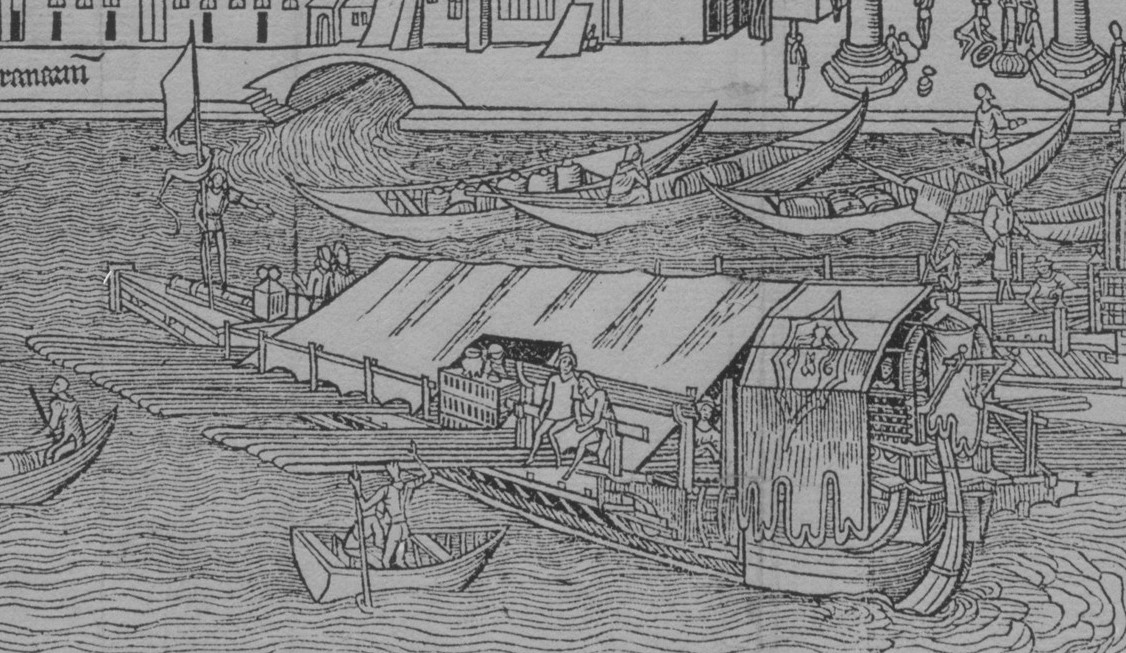
The first known depiction of a galley with a fixed, forward-facing centerline cannon; woodcut by Erhard Reuwich from Peregrinatio in terram sanctam ("Pilgrimage to the Holy Land"), 1486.

Galleys had been synonymous with warships in the Mediterranean for at least 2,000 years, and continued to fulfill that role with the invention of gunpowder and heavy artillery. Though early 20th-century historians often dismissed the galleys as hopelessly outclassed with the first introduction of naval artillery on sailing ships, it was the galley that was favored by the introduction of heavy naval guns. Galleys were a more "mature" technology with long-established tactics and traditions of supporting social institutions and naval organizations. In combination with the intensified conflicts this led to a substantial increase in the size of galley fleets from c. 1520–80, above all in the Mediterranean, but also in other European theatres. Galleys and similar oared vessels remained uncontested as the most effective gun-armed warships in theory until the 1560s, and in practice for a few decades more, and were actually considered a grave risk to sailing warships. (Note: The British naval historian Nicholas Rodger describes this as a "crisis in naval warfare" which eventually led to the development of the galleon, which combined ahead-firing capabilities, heavy broadside guns and a considerable increase in maneuverability by introduction of more advanced sailing rigs. For more detailed arguments concerning the development of broadside armament, see Rodger 1996.) They could effectively fight other galleys, attack sailing ships in calm weather or in unfavorable winds (or deny them action if needed) and act as floating siege batteries. They were also unequaled in their amphibious capabilities, even at extended ranges, as exemplified by French interventions as far north as Scotland in the mid-16th century.

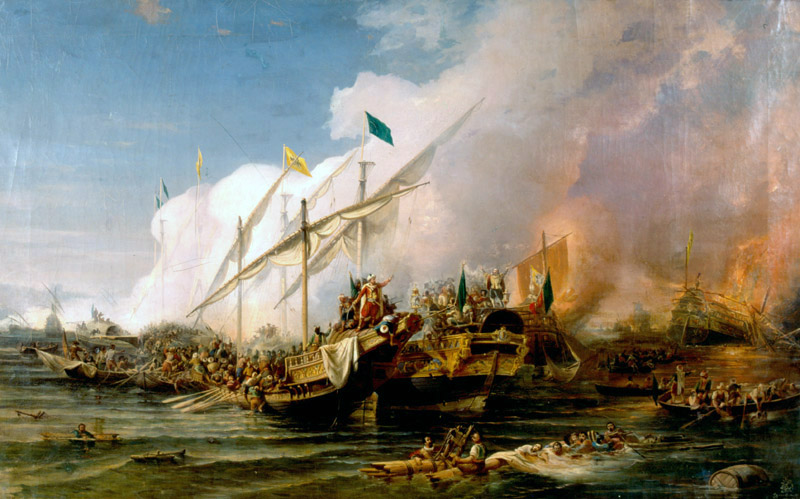
Fires seen on galleons caused by galleys in a painting titled Barbarossa Hayreddin Pasha defeats the Holy League of Charles V under the command of Andrea Doria at the Battle of Preveza (1538), by Osman Nuri Pasha and Hovhannes Umed Behzad (1809–1874), Istanbul Naval Museum

Heavy artillery on galleys was mounted in the bow, which aligned easily with the long-standing tactical tradition of attacking head on, bow first. The ordnance on galleys was heavy from its introduction in the 1480s, and capable of quickly demolishing the high, thin medieval stone walls that still prevailed in the 16th century. This temporarily upended the strength of older seaside fortresses, which had to be rebuilt to cope with gunpowder weapons. The addition of guns also improved the amphibious abilities of galleys as they could make assaults supported with heavy firepower, and were even more effectively defended when beached stern-first. An accumulation and generalizing of bronze cannons and small firearms in the Mediterranean during the 16th century increased the cost of warfare, but also made those dependent on them more resilient to manpower losses. Older ranged weapons, like bows or even crossbows, required considerable skill to handle, sometimes a lifetime of practice, while gunpowder weapons required considerably less training to use successfully. According to an influential study by military historian John F. Guilmartin, this transition in warfare, along with the introduction of much cheaper cast iron guns in the 1580s, proved the "death knell" for the war galley as a significant military vessel. Gunpowder weapons began to displace men as the fighting power of armed forces, making individual soldiers more deadly and effective. As offensive weapons, firearms could be stored for years with minimal maintenance and did not require the expenses associated with soldiers. Manpower could thus be exchanged for capital investments, something which benefited sailing vessels that were already far more economical in their use of manpower. It also served to increase their strategic range and to out-compete galleys as fighting ships.

Skillful usage of guns in galley warfare was seen in the Battle of the Gulf of Tunis, where Spanish and Italian galleys under Álvaro de Bazán y Benavides engaged and overwhelmed Barbary galleons thanks to the superior range of their own cannons.

=== Zenith in the Mediterranean ===
The Battle of Lepanto in 1571, naval engagement between allied Christian forces and the Ottoman Turks; unknown painter, late 16th century,

Atlantic-style warfare based on large, heavily armed sailing ships began to change naval warfare in the Mediterranean in the early 17th century. In 1616, a small Spanish squadron of six sailing ships cruised the eastern Mediterranean and defeated an Ottoman fleet of 55 galleys at the Battle of Cape Gelidonya. By 1650, war galleys were used primarily in the struggles between Venice and the Ottoman Empire for strategic island and coastal trading bases, and until the 1720s by both France and Spain for largely amphibious and cruising operations or in combination with heavy sailing ships in a major battle, where they played specialized roles. An example of this was when a Spanish fleet used its galleys in a mixed naval/amphibious battle in the second 1641 battle of Tarragona, to break a French naval blockade and land troops and supplies. Even the Venetians, Ottomans, and other Mediterranean powers began to build Atlantic style warships for use in the Mediterranean in the latter part of the century. Christian and Muslim corsairs had been using galleys in sea roving and in support of the major powers in times of war, but largely replaced them with xebecs, various sail/oar hybrids, and a few remaining light galleys in the early 17th century.

No large all-galley battles were fought after the gigantic clash at Lepanto in 1571, and galleys were mostly used as cruisers or for supporting sailing warships as a rearguard in fleet actions, similar to the duties performed by frigates outside the Mediterranean. They could assist damaged ships out of the line, but generally only in very calm weather, as was the case at the Battle of Málaga in 1704. They could also defeat larger ships that were isolated, as when in 1651 a squadron of Spanish galleys captured a French galleon at Formentera. For small states and principalities as well as groups of private merchants, galleys were more affordable than large and complex sailing warships, and were used as defense against piracy. Galleys required less timber to build, the design was relatively simple and they carried fewer guns. They were tactically flexible and could be used for naval ambushes as well amphibious operations. They also required few skilled seamen and were difficult for sailing ships to catch, but vital in hunting down and catching other galleys and oared raiders.

Mediterranean fleet strengths in number of constructed galleys. Figures in parentheses "are uncertain or approximate". (Note: The figures include only standard galleys and flagship galleys, not galleasses or smaller galley types (galiots, brigantins, etc.). See also Glete 1993 for more details on galley construction totals 1600–1800.)
State	1650	1670	1700	1740	1760	1790	1800
Venice	(70)	(60)	(50)	(40)	(30)	(20)	–
Ottoman Empire	(70–100)	(60)	(30)	(30)	(15)	(15)	(0)
France	36	25	42	15	15	10	0
Spain	(30–40)	(30)	30	(7)	7	0	2
Papal state	5	5	4	6	4	5	0
Malta	6	7	8	5	4	4	–
Genoa	10	(10)	(6)	6	(6)	(6)	–
Tuscany	5	4	3–4	2–3	(2)	0	0
Savoy/Sardinia	(2)	(2)	(2)	4	4	(0)	0
Austria	0	0	0	4	0	0	4
Naples	–	–	–	0	4	3	0
Total (approximate)	200	170	120	90	60	45	6

=== Decline ===
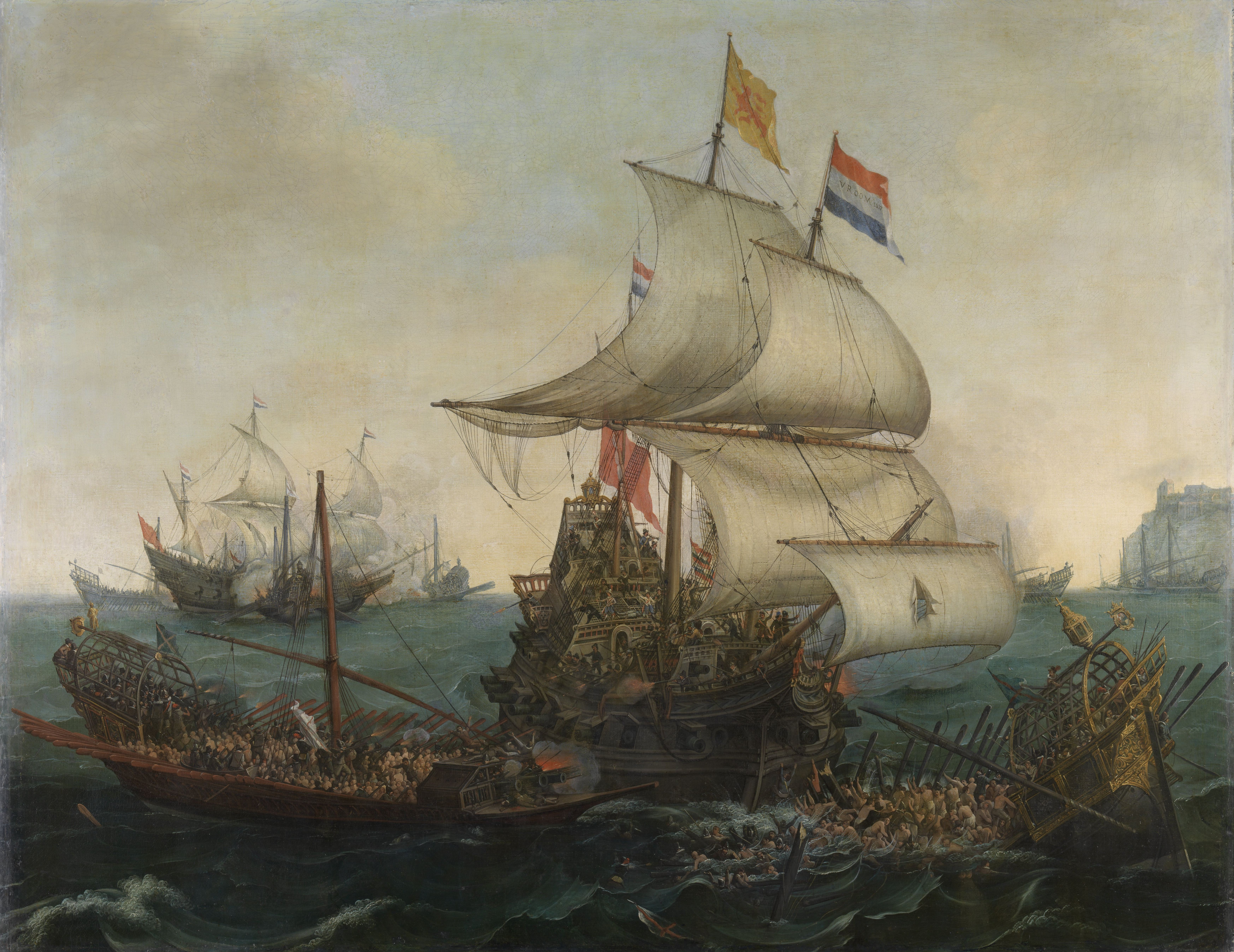
Dutch ships ramming Spanish galleys in the Battle of the Narrow Seas, October 1602; painting by Hendrick Cornelisz Vroom, 1617.

Among the largest galley fleets in the 17th century were operated by the two major Mediterranean powers, France and Spain. France had by the 1650s become the most powerful state in Europe, and expanded its galley forces under the rule of the absolutist "Sun King" Louis XIV. In the 1690s the French galley corps (corps des galères) reached its all-time peak with more than 50 vessels manned by over 15,000 men and officers, becoming the largest galley fleet in the world at the time. Although there was intense rivalry between France and Spain, not a single galley battle occurred between the two great powers during this period, and virtually no naval battles between other nations either. During the War of the Spanish Succession, French galleys were involved in actions against Antwerp and Harwich, but due to the intricacies of alliance politics there were never any Franco-Spanish galley clashes. In the first half of the 18th century, the other major naval powers in the Mediterranean Sea, the Order of Saint John based in Malta, and of the Papal States in central Italy, cut down drastically on their galley forces. Despite the lack of action, the galley corps received vast resources (25–50% of the French naval expenditures) during the 1660s. It was maintained as a functional fighting force right up until its abolition in 1748, though its primary function was more of a symbol of Louis XIV's absolutist ambitions.

The last recorded battle in the Mediterranean where galleys played a significant part was at Matapan in 1717, between the Ottomans and Venice and its allies, though they had little influence on the outcome. Few large-scale naval battles were fought in the Mediterranean throughout most of the remainder of the 18th century. The Tuscan galley fleet was dismantled around 1718, Naples had only four old vessels by 1734 and the French Galley Corps had ceased to exist as an independent arm in 1748. Venice, the Papal States, and the Knights of Malta were the only state fleets that maintained galleys, though in nothing like their previous quantities. By 1790, there were fewer than 50 galleys in service among all the Mediterranean powers, half of which belonged to Venice.

=== Northern Europe ===
Oared vessels remained in use in northern waters for a long time, though in subordinate role and in particular circumstances. In the Italian Wars, French galleys brought up from the Mediterranean to the Atlantic posed a serious threat to the early English Tudor navy during coastal operations. The response came in the building of a considerable fleet of oared vessels, including hybrids with a complete three-masted rig, as well as a Mediterranean-style galleys (that were even attempted to be manned with convicts and slaves). Under King Henry VIII, the English navy used several kinds of vessels that were adapted to local needs. English galliasses (very different from the Mediterranean vessel of the same name) were employed to cover the flanks of larger naval forces while pinnaces and rowbarges were used for scouting or even as a backup for the longboats and tenders for the larger sailing ships. During the Dutch Revolt (1566–1609) both the Dutch and Spanish found galleys useful for amphibious operations in the many shallow waters around the Low Countries where deep-draft sailing vessels could not enter.

While galleys were too vulnerable to be used in large numbers in the open waters of the Atlantic, they were well-suited for use in much of the Baltic Sea by Denmark-Norway, Sweden, Russia, and some of the Central European powers with ports on the southern coast. There were two types of naval battlegrounds in the Baltic. One was the open sea, suitable for large sailing fleets; the other was the coastal areas and especially the chain of small islands and archipelagos that ran almost uninterrupted from Stockholm to the Gulf of Finland. In these areas, conditions were often too calm, cramped, and shallow for sailing ships, but they were excellent for galleys and other oared vessels. Galleys of the Mediterranean type were first introduced in the Baltic Sea around the mid-16th century as competition between the Scandinavian states of Denmark and Sweden intensified. The Swedish galley fleet was the largest outside the Mediterranean, and served as an auxiliary branch of the army. Very little is known about the design of Baltic Sea galleys, except that they were overall smaller than in the Mediterranean and they were rowed by army soldiers rather than convicts or slaves.

=== 18th-century Baltic revival ===
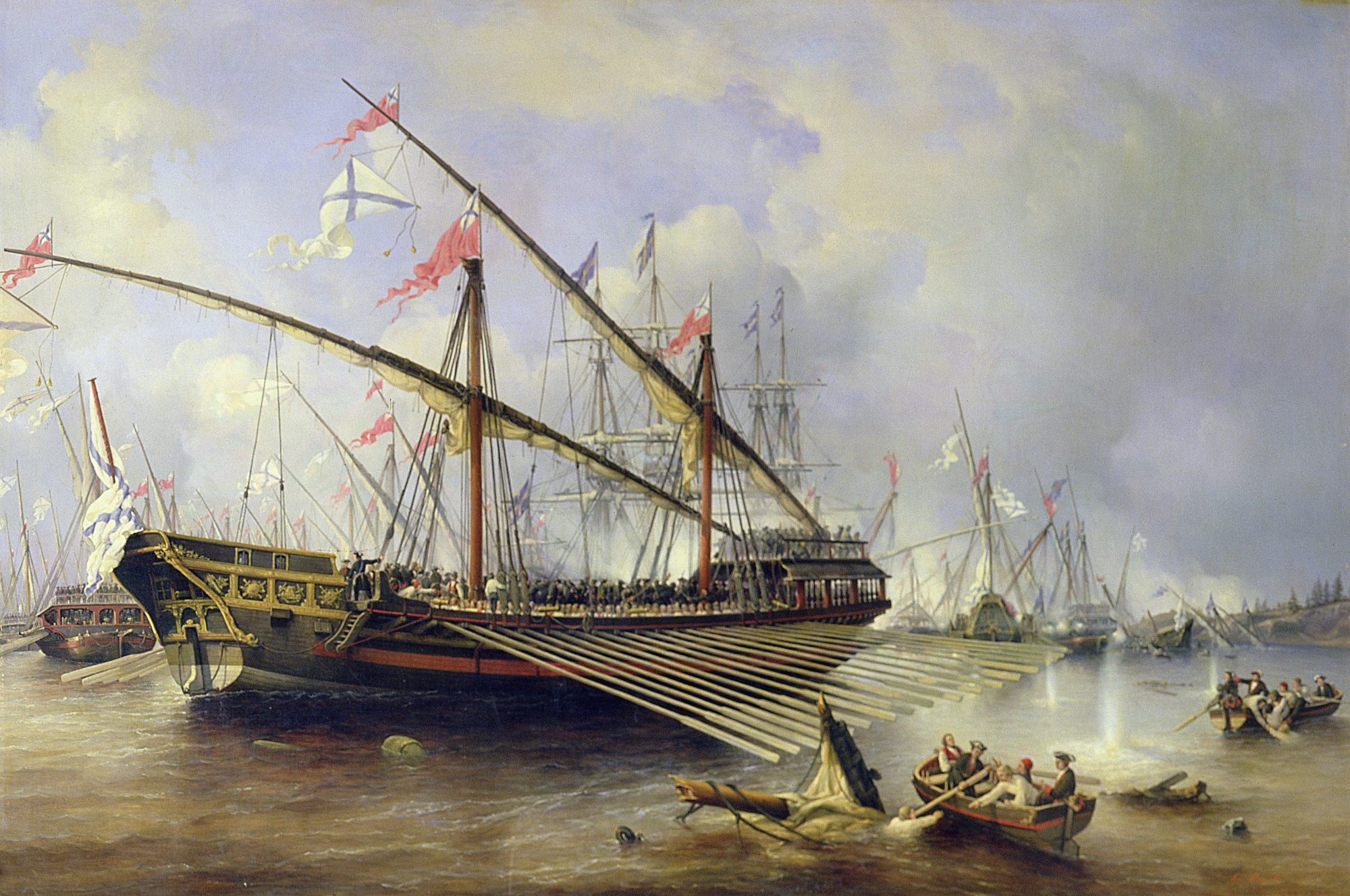
A painting of the Battle of Grengam in 1720 by Ferdinand Perrot (1808–41) showing a large Russian galley engaging Swedish frigates at close range.

Galleys were introduced to the Baltic Sea in the 16th century but the details of their designs are lacking due to the absence of records. They might have been built in a more regional style, but the only known depiction from the time shows a typical Mediterranean style vessel. There is conclusive evidence that Denmark-Norway became the first Baltic power to build classic Mediterranean-style galleys in the 1660s, though they proved to be generally too large to be useful in the shallow waters of the Baltic archipelagos. Sweden and especially Russia began to launch galleys and various rowed vessels in great numbers during the Great Northern War in the first two decades of the 18th century. Sweden was late in the game when it came to building an effective oared fighting fleet (skärgårdsflottan, the archipelago fleet, officially arméns flotta, the fleet of the army), while the Russian galley forces under Tsar Peter I developed into a supporting arm for the sailing navy and a well-functioning auxiliary of the army which infiltrated and conducted numerous raids on the eastern Swedish coast in the 1710s.

Sweden and Russia became the two main competitors for Baltic dominance in the 18th century, and built the largest galley fleets in the world at the time. They were used for amphibious operations in Russo-Swedish wars of 1741–43 and 1788–90. The last galleys ever constructed were built in 1796 by Russia, and remained in service well into the 19th century, but saw little action. The last time galleys were deployed in action was when the Russian navy was attacked in Åbo (Turku) in 1854 as part of the Crimean War. In the second half of the 18th century, the role of Baltic galleys in coastal fleets was replaced first with hybrid "archipelago frigates" (such as the turuma or pojama) and xebecs, and after the 1790s with various types of gunboats.

Baltic galley fleet strengths (Note: Based on Glete 1993. Russian and Swedish figures are both approximates. Baltic galleys were of similar construction as Mediterranean equivalents, but usually smaller. Few of them had more than 22 pairs of benches and many fewer than 16.)
	1680	1700	1721	1740	1750	1770	1790	1810	1830
Denmark–Norway	13	7	8	0	0	13	9	0	0
Sweden	0	0	24	38	80	51	39	26	4
Russia	0	0	170	74	100	56	105	20	< 20
total	13	7	202	112	180	120	153	46	< 24

== Design and construction ==
A schematic view of the mortise and tenon technique for shipbuilding that dominated the Mediterranean until the 7th century AD

The documentary evidence for the construction of ancient galleys is fragmentary, particularly in pre-Roman times. Plans and schematics in the modern sense did not exist until around the 17th century and nothing comparable has survived from ancient times. How galleys were constructed has therefore been a matter of looking at circumstantial evidence in literature, art, coinage and monuments that include ships, some of them actually in natural size. Since the war galleys floated even with a ruptured hull and virtually never had any ballast or heavy cargo that could sink them, almost no wrecks have so far been found.

On the funerary monument of the Egyptian king Sahure (2487–2475 BC) in Abusir, there are relief images of vessels with a marked sheer (the upward curvature at each end of the hull) and seven pairs of oars along its side, a number that was likely to have been symbolical rather than a realistic depiction, and steering oars in the stern. These vessels have only one mast and vertical stems and sternposts, with the front decorated with an Eye of Horus, the first example of such a decoration. The eye was later used by other Mediterranean cultures to decorate seagoing craft in the belief that it helped to guide the ship safely to its destination. The early Egyptian vessels apparently lacked a keel. To provide a stiffening along its length, they had large cables, trusses, connecting stem and stern resting on massive crutches on deck. They were held in tension to avoid hogging while at sea (bending the ship's construction upward in the middle). In the 15th century BC, Egyptian galley-like craft were still depicted with the distinctive extreme sheer, but had by then developed the distinctive forward-curving stern decorations with ornaments in the shape of lotus flowers. (Note: This flower-inspired stern detail would later be widely used by both Greek and Roman ships.) They had possibly developed a primitive type of keel, but still retained the large cables intended to prevent hogging.

The construction of the earliest oared vessels is mostly unknown and highly conjectural. They likely used a mortise construction, but were sewn together rather than pinned together with nails and dowels. Being completely open, they were rowed (or even paddled) from the open deck, and likely had "ram entries", projections from the bow lowered the resistance of moving through water, making them slightly more hydrodynamic. The first true galleys, the triaconters (literally "thirty-oarers") and penteconters ("fifty-oarers") were developed from these early designs and set the standard for the larger designs that would come later. They were rowed on only one level, which made them fairly slow, likely only about 10 km/h (6 mph). By the 8th century BC the first galleys rowed at two levels had been developed, among the earliest being the two-level penteconters which were considerably shorter than the one-level equivalents, and therefore more maneuverable. They were an estimated 25 m in length and displaced 15 tonnes with 25 pairs of oars. These could have reached an estimated top speed of up to 14 km/h (9 mph), making them the first genuine warships when fitted with bow rams. They were equipped with a single square sail on mast set roughly halfway along the length of the hull.

=== Advent of the trireme ===
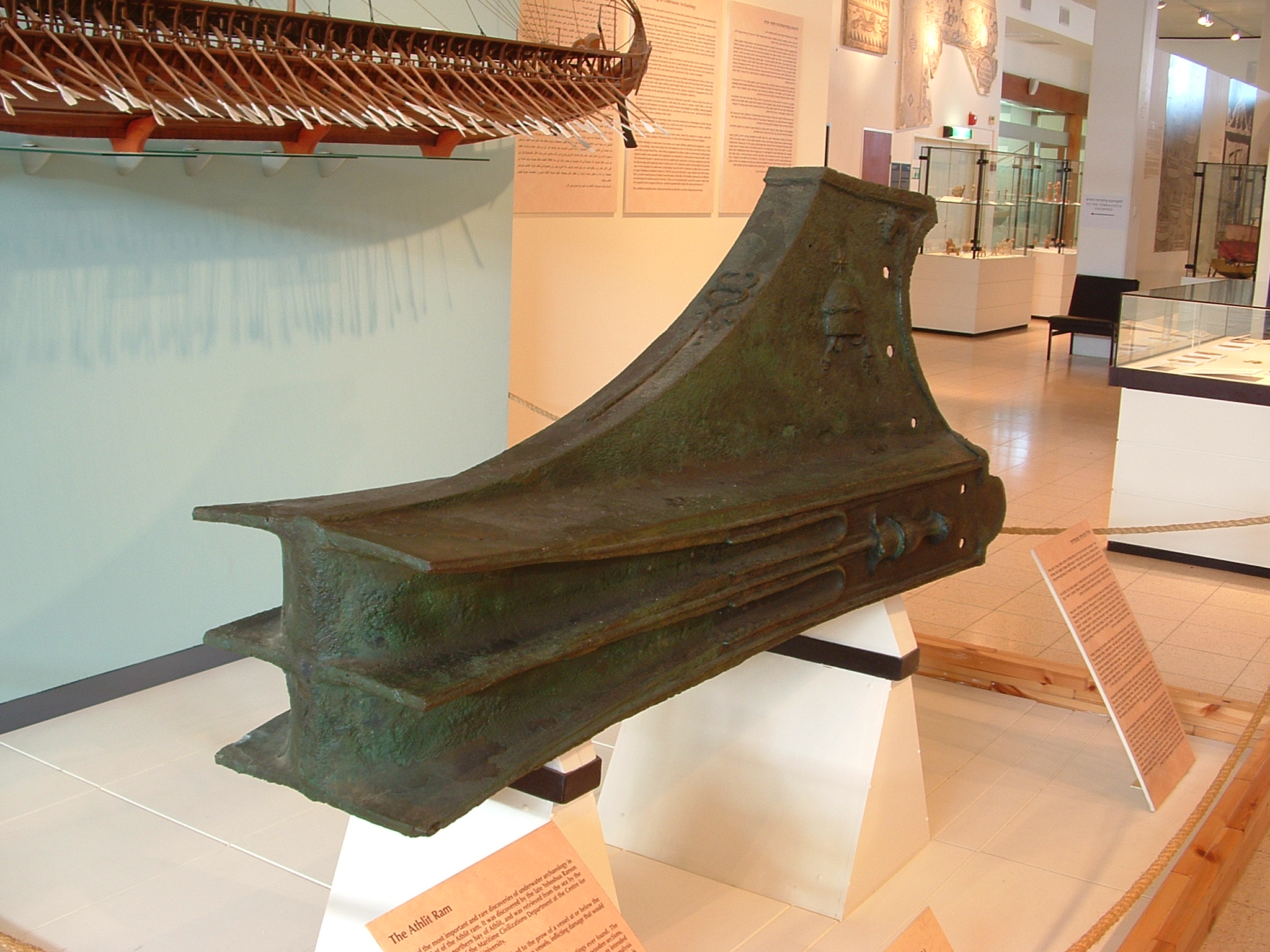
The Athlit ram, a preserved ram from around 530–270 BC. It weighs nearly half a tonne and was probably fitted to a "five" or a "four".

By the 5th century BC, the first triremes were in use by various powers in the eastern Mediterranean. This was a fully developed, highly specialized war galley that was capable of high speeds and complex maneuvers. At nearly 40 m in length, displacing up to 50 tonnes, it was more than three times as expensive to build as a two-level penteconter. A trireme also had an additional mast with a smaller square sail placed near the bow. Up to 170 oarsmen sat on three levels with one oar each that varied slightly in length. To accommodate three levels of oars, rowers sat staggered on three levels. Arrangements of the three levels are believed to have varied, but the most well-documented design made use of a projecting structure, or outrigger, where the oarlock in the form of a thole pin was placed. This allowed the outermost row of oarsmen enough leverage for full strokes that made efficient use of their oars.

The first dedicated war galleys fitted with rams were built with a mortise and tenon technique, a so-called shell-first method. In this, the planking of the hull was strong enough to hold the ship together structurally, and was also watertight without the need for caulking. Hulls had sharp bottoms without keelsons in order to support the structure and were reinforced by transverse framing secured with dowels with nails driven through them. To prevent the hull from hogging there was a hypozoma (υπόζωμα = underbelt), a thick, doubled rope that connected bow with stern. It was kept taut to add strength to the construction along its length, but its exact design or the method of tightening is not known. The ram, the primary weapon of ancient galleys from around the 8th to the 4th century, was not attached directly on the hull but to a structure extending from it. This way the ram could twist off if got stuck after ramming rather than breaking the integrity of the hull. The ram fitting consisted of a massive, projecting timber and the ram itself was a thick bronze casting with horizontal blades that could weigh from 400 kg up to 2 tonnes.

=== Hellenistic and Roman eras ===
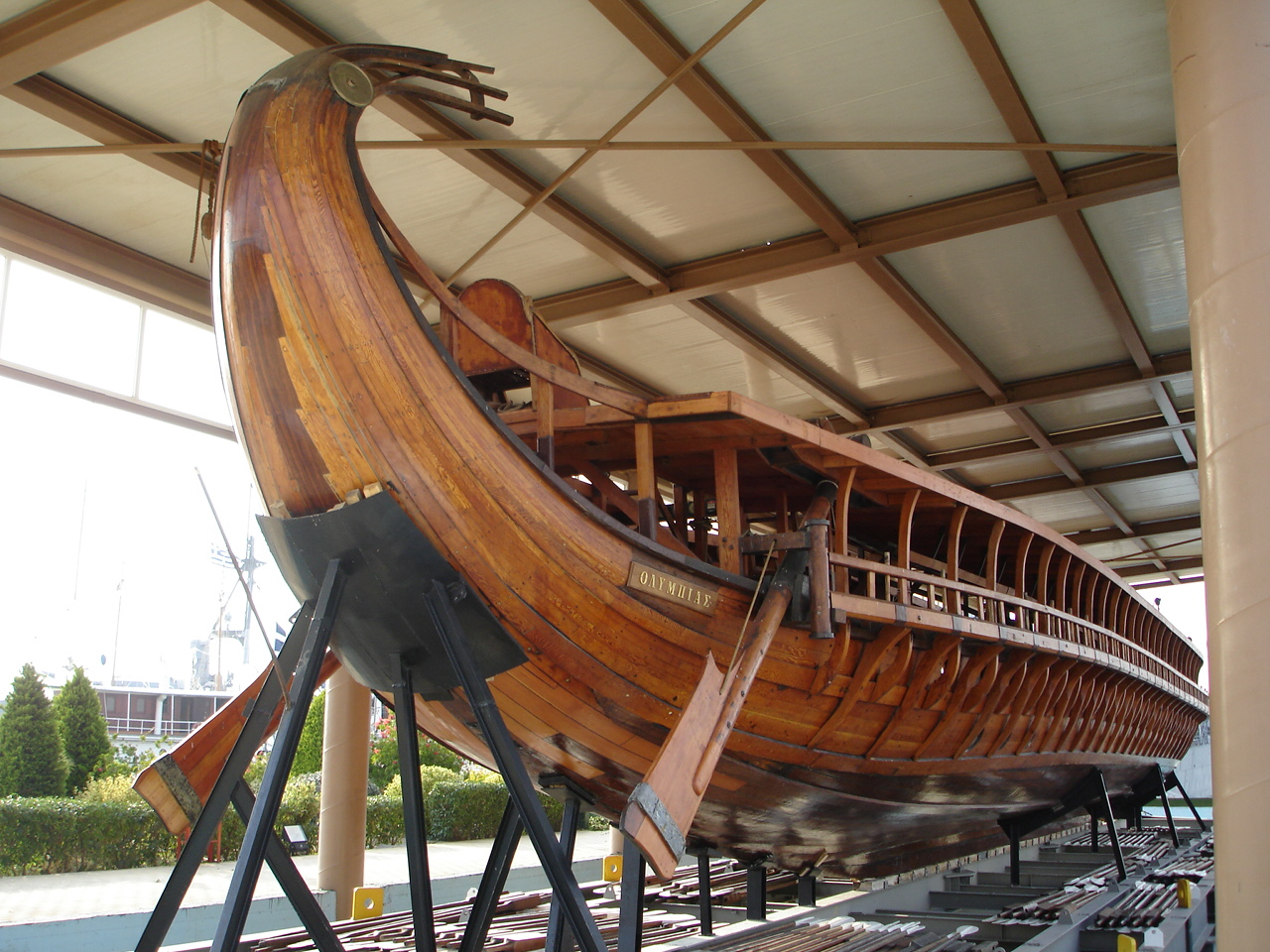
The stern of the modern trireme replica Olympias with twin side rudders

Galleys from 4th century BC up to the time of the early Roman Empire in the 1st century AD became successively larger. Three levels of oars was the practical upper limit, but it was improved on by making ships longer, broader, and heavier and placing more than one rower per oar. Naval conflict grew more intense and extensive, and by 100 BC galleys with four, five or six rows of oarsmen were commonplace and carried large complements of soldiers and catapults. With high freeboard (up to 3 m) and additional tower structures from which missiles could be shot down onto enemy decks, they were intended to be like floating fortresses. Designs with everything from eight rows of oarsmen and upward were built, but most of them are believed to have been impractical show pieces never used in actual warfare. Ptolemy IV, the Greek pharaoh of Egypt 221–205 BC, is recorded as building a gigantic ship with forty rows of oarsmen, though no specification of its design remains. One suggested design was that of a huge trireme catamaran with up to 14 men per oar and it is assumed that it was intended as a showpiece rather than a practical warship.

With the consolidation of Roman imperial power, the size of both fleets and galleys decreased considerably. The huge polyremes disappeared and the fleet were equipped primarily with triremes and liburnians, compact biremes with 25 pairs of oars that were well suited for patrol duty and chasing down raiders and pirates. In the northern provinces oared patrol boats were employed to keep local tribes in check along the shores of rivers like the Rhine and the Danube. As the need for large warships disappeared, the design of the trireme, the pinnacle of ancient war ship design, fell into obscurity and was eventually forgotten. The last known reference to triremes in battle is dated to 324 at the Battle of the Hellespont. In the late 5th century the Byzantine historian Zosimus declared the knowledge of how to build them to have been long since forgotten.

=== Middle Ages ===
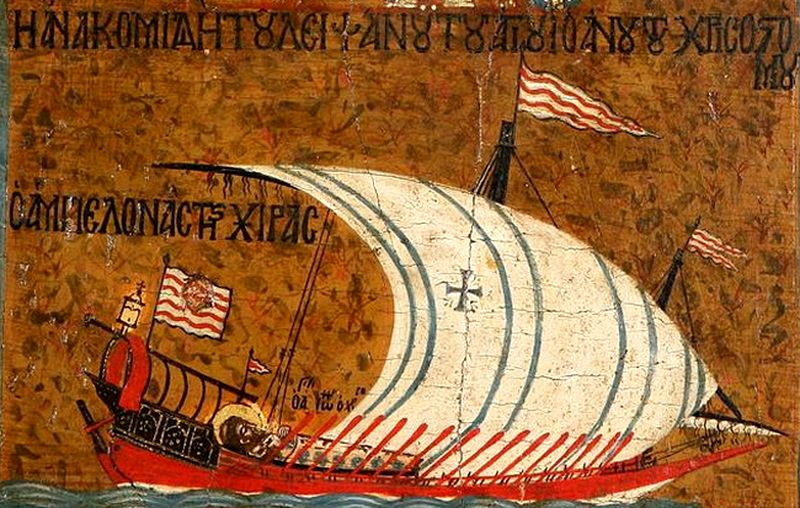
14th-century painting of a light galley, from an icon now at the Byzantine and Christian Museum at Athens

The primary warship of the Byzantine navy until the 12th century was the dromon and other similar ship types. Considered an evolution of the Roman liburnian, the term first appeared in the late 5th century, and was commonly used for a specific kind of war-galley by the 6th century. The term dromōn (literally "runner") itself comes from the Greek root drom-(áō), "to run", and 6th-century authors like Procopius are explicit in their references to the speed of these vessels. During the next few centuries, as the naval struggle with the Arabs intensified, heavier versions with two or possibly even three banks of oars evolved.

The accepted view is that the main developments which differentiated the early dromons from the liburnians, and that henceforth characterized Mediterranean galleys, were the adoption of a full deck, the abandonment of rams on the bow in favor of an above-water spur, and the gradual introduction of lateen sails. The exact reasons for the abandonment of the ram are unclear. Depictions of upward-pointing beaks in the 4th-century Vatican Vergil manuscript may well illustrate that the ram had already been replaced by a spur in late Roman galleys. One possibility is that the change occurred because of the gradual evolution of the ancient shell-first construction method, against which rams had been designed, into the skeleton-first method, which produced a stronger and more flexible hull, less susceptible to ram attacks. At least by the early 7th century, the ram's original function had been forgotten.

The dromons that Procopius described were single-banked ships of probably 25 oars per side. Unlike ancient vessels, which used an outrigger, these extended directly from the hull. In the later bireme dromons of the 9th and 10th centuries, the two oar banks were divided by the deck, with the first oar bank was situated below, whilst the second oar bank was situated above deck; these rowers were expected to fight alongside the marines in boarding operations. The overall length of these ships was probably about 32 meters. The stern (prymnē) had a tent that covered the captain's berth; the prow featured an elevated forecastle that acted as a fighting platform and could house one or more siphons for the discharge of Greek fire; and on the largest dromons, there were wooden castles on either side between the masts, providing archers with elevated firing platforms. The bow spur was intended to ride over an enemy ship's oars, breaking them and rendering it helpless against missile fire and boarding actions.

=== Development of the galea ===
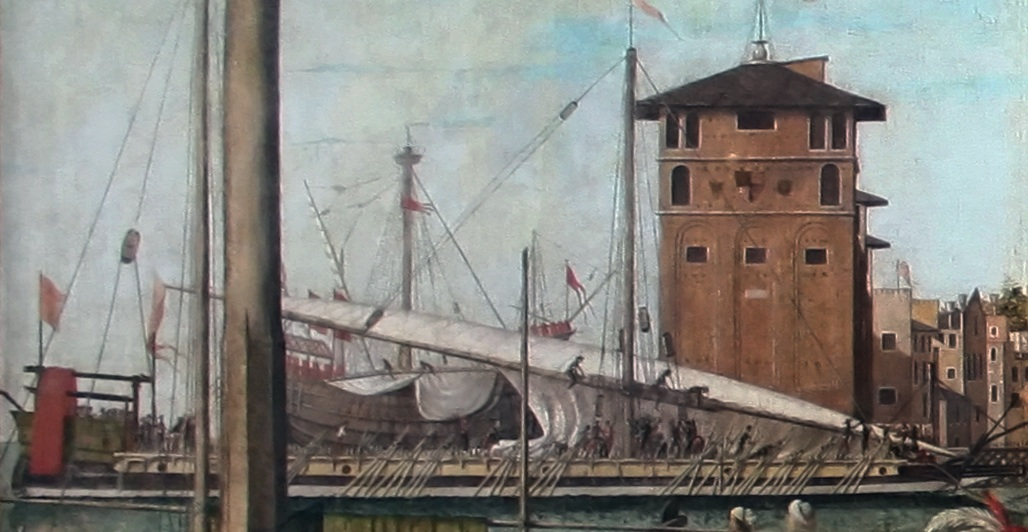
A Venetian galea sottile from the late 15th century from Vittore Carpaccio's Return of the Ambassadors in the series Legend of Saint Ursula. The oars are arranged in groups of three according to the alla sensile rowing method.

From the 12th century, the design of war galleys evolved into the form that would remain largely the same until the building of the last war galleys in the late 18th century. The length to breadth-ratio was a minimum of 8:1. A rectangular telaro, a projecting outrigger, was added to support the oars and the rowers' benches were laid out in a diagonal herringbone pattern angled aft with a central gangway (corsia) running along the centerline. The angling of the benches allowed the rowers to handle individual oars without interfering with each other's movements. It was based on the form of the galea, the smaller Byzantine galleys, and would be known mostly by the Italian term galea sottile (literally "slender galley"). A second, smaller mast was added sometime in the 13th century and the number of rowers rose from two to three rowers per bench as a standard from the late 13th to the early 14th century. The galee sottili would make up the bulk the main war fleets of every major naval power in the Mediterranean, assisted by the smaller single-masted galiotte, as well as the Christian and Muslim corsairs' fleets. Ottoman galleys were very similar in design, though in general smaller, faster under sail, but slower under oars. The standard size of the galley remained stable from the 14th until the early 16th century, when the introduction of naval artillery began to have effects on design and tactics.

The traditional two side rudders were complemented with a stern rudder sometime after c. 1400 and eventually the side rudders disappeared altogether. (Note: Pryor refers to claims that stern rudders evolved by the Byzantines and Arabs as early as the 9th century, but refutes it due to lack of evidence.) It was also during the 15th century that large artillery pieces were first mounted on galleys. Burgundian records from the mid-15th century describe galleys with some form of guns, but do not specify the size. The first conclusive evidence of a large cannon mounted on a galley comes from a woodcut of a Venetian galley in 1486. The first guns were fixed directly on timbers in the bow and aimed directly forward, a placement that would remain largely unchanged until the galley disappeared from active service in the 19th century.

=== Early modern standardization ===
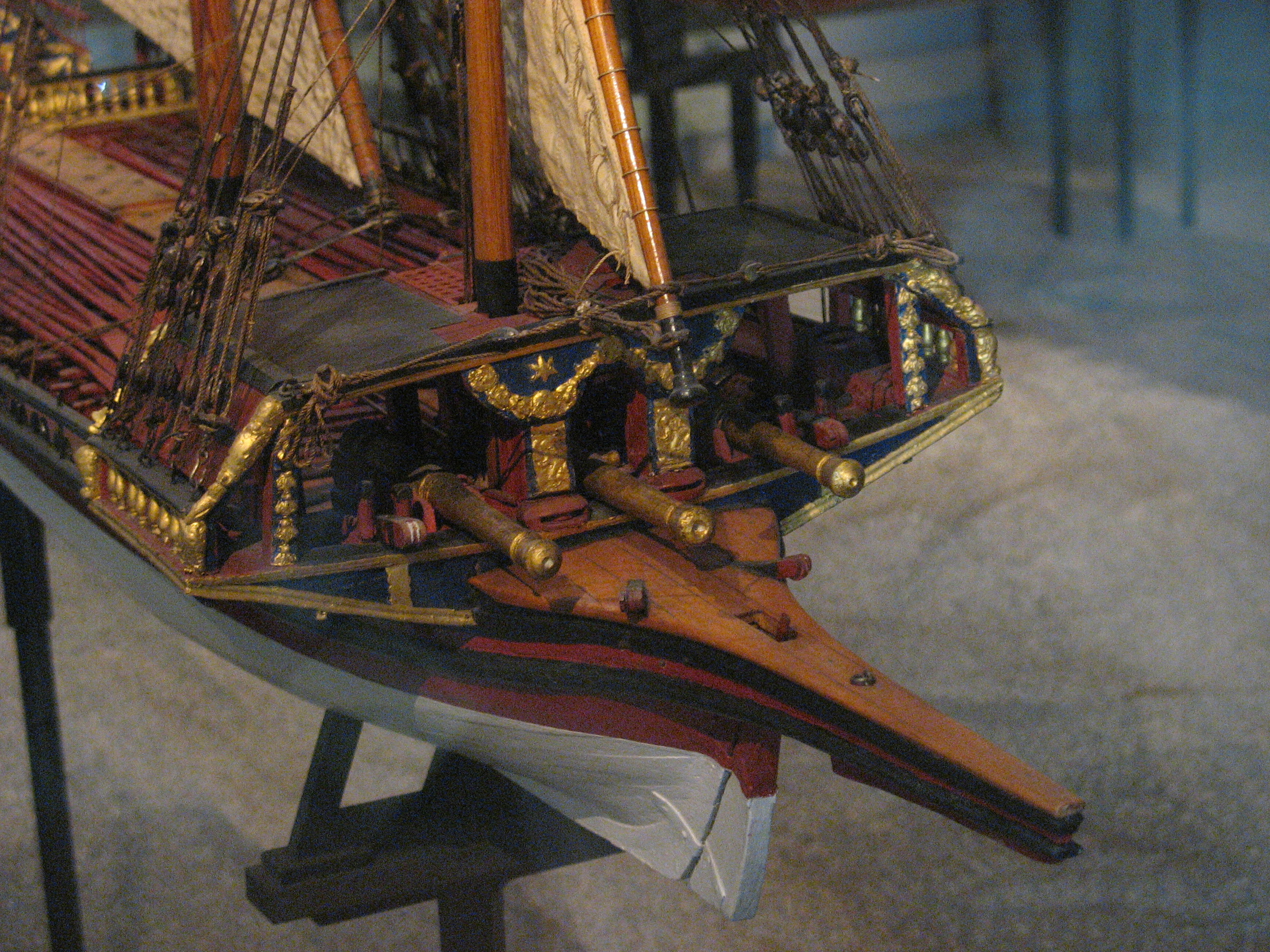
The ubiquitous bow fighting platform (rambade) of early modern galleys. This model is of a 1715 Swedish galley, somewhat smaller than the standard Mediterranean war galley, but still based on the same design; contemporary model in the Maritime Museum in Stockholm.

With the introduction of guns in the bows of galleys, a permanent wooden structure called rambade (French: rambade; Italian: rambata; Spanish: arrumbada) was introduced. The rambade became standard on virtually all galleys in the early 16th century. There were some variations in the navies of different Mediterranean powers, but the overall layout was the same. The forward-aiming battery was covered by a wooden platform which gave gunners a minimum of protection, and functioned as both a staging area for boarding attacks and as a firing platform for on-board soldiers. After its introduction, the rambade became a standard detail on every fighting galley until the very end of galley era in the early 19th century. By the mid-17th century, galleys reached what has been described as their "final form". Galleys had looked more or less the same for over four centuries and a fairly standardized classification system had been developed by the Mediterranean bureaucracies, based primarily on the number of benches in a vessel. A Mediterranean galley would have 25 pairs of oars and total of about 500 men. Command galleys (lanternas, "lantern galleys") were even larger with 30 pairs of oars and up to seven rowers per oar. Armament consisted of one heavy 24- or 36-pounder and two to four 4- to 12-pounders in the bow. Rows of light swivel guns were often placed along the entire length of the galley on the railings for close-quarter defense. The length-to-width ratio of the ships was about 8:1, with two masts carrying one large lateen sail each. In the Baltic, galleys were generally shorter with a length-to-width ratio from 5:1 to 7:1, an adaptation to the cramped conditions of the Baltic archipelagos.

A single mainmast was standard on most war galleys until c. 1600. A second, shorter mast could be raised temporarily in the bows, but became permanent by the early 17th century. It was stepped slightly to the side to allow for the recoil of the heavy guns; the other was placed roughly in the center of the ship. A third smaller mast further astern, akin to a mizzen mast, was also introduced on large galleys, possibly in the early 17th century, but was standard at least by the early 18th century. Galleys had little room for provisions and depended on frequent resupplying and were often beached at night to rest the crew and cook meals. Where cooking areas were actually present, they consisted of a clay-lined box with a hearth or similar cooking equipment fitted on the vessel in place of a rowing bench, usually on the port (left) side.

18th century model of the French La Dauphine from 1736 on display at the Toulon naval museum
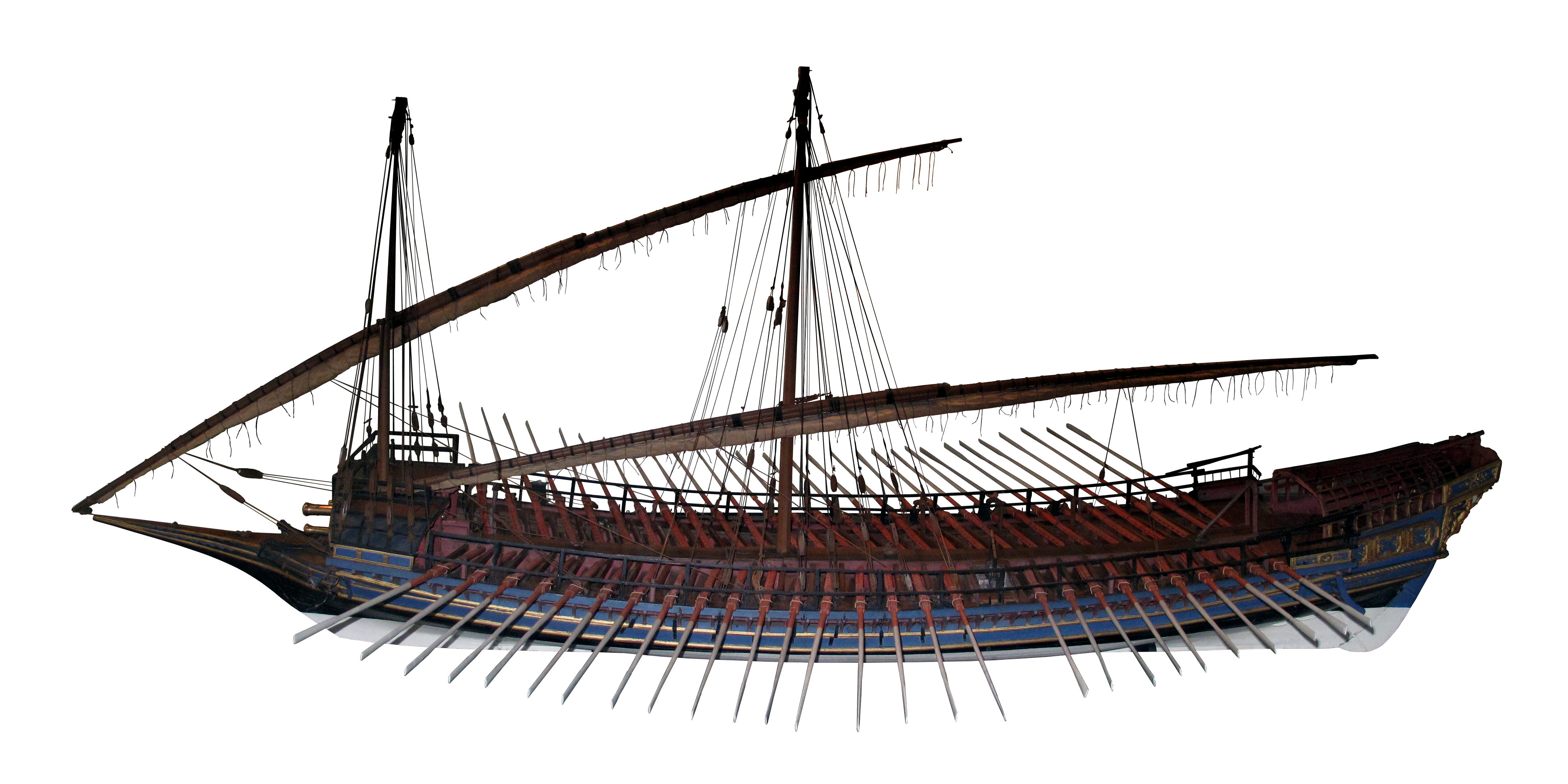
Side view

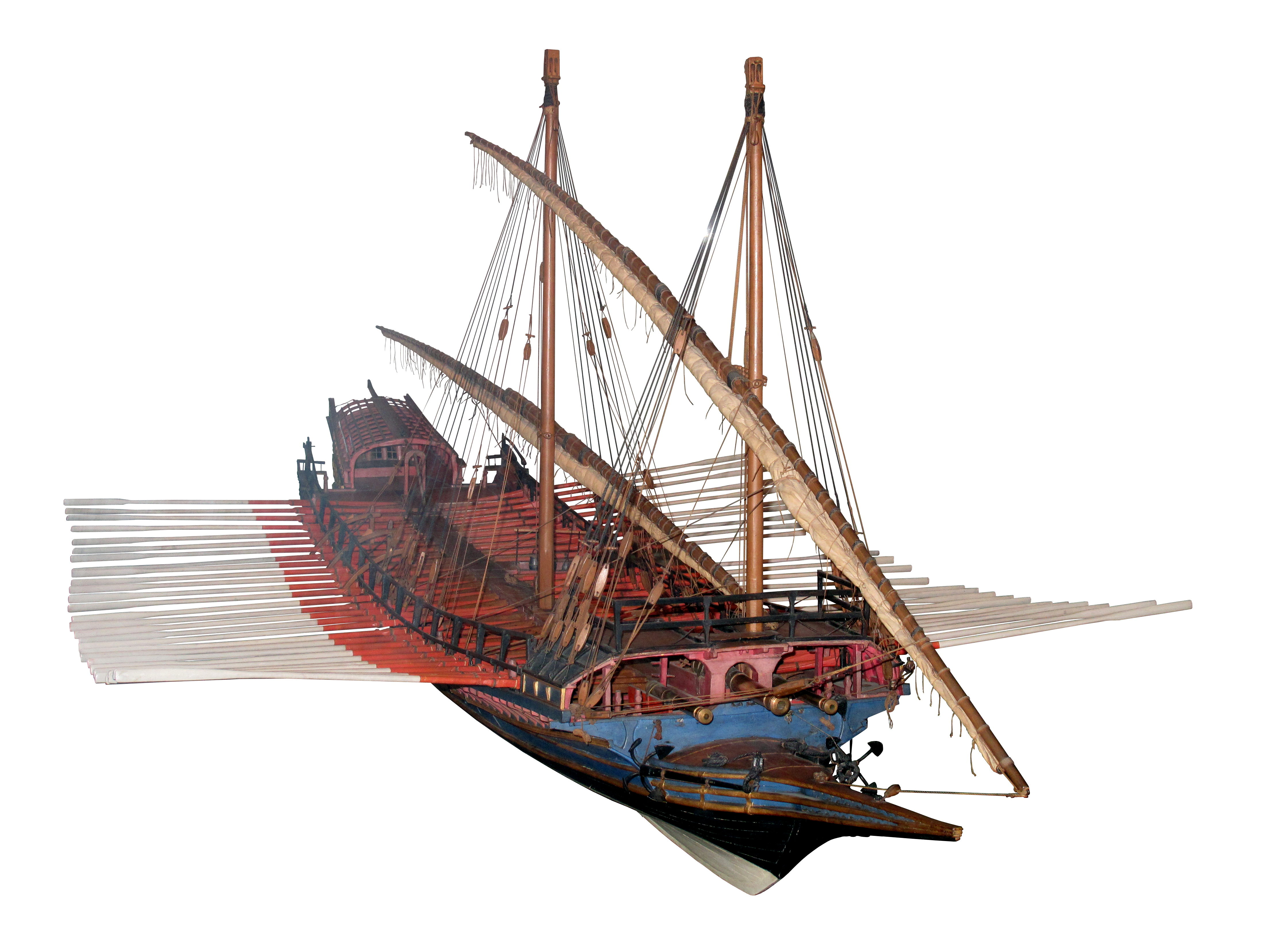
Front view

== Propulsion ==
=== Rowing ===
Modern reconstruction of a cross-section of an ancient Greek trireme, showing the three levels of rowers

Ancient rowing was done in a fixed seated position with rowers facing the stern, the most efficient rowing position. A sliding stroke, which provided the strength from both legs as well as the arms, was suggested by earlier historians, but no conclusive evidence has supported it. Practical experiments with the full-scale trireme reconstruction Olympias has shown that there was insufficient space to perform a sliding stroke movement, and moving or rolling seats would have been highly impractical to construct with ancient technology. Rowers in ancient war galleys sat below the upper deck with little view of their surroundings. The rowing was therefore managed by supervisors, and coordinated with pipes or rhythmic chanting. Galleys were highly maneuverable, able to turn on their axis or even to row backward, though such maneuvers required a skilled and experienced crew. In galleys with an arrangement of three men per oar, as in the larger polyremes, all would be seated, but the rower furthest inboard would perform a stand-and-sit stroke, getting up on his feet to push the oar forward, and then sitting down again to pull it back.

The faster a vessel travels, the more energy it uses. Reaching high speeds requires energy which a human-powered vessel is incapable of producing. Oar systems generate very low amounts of energy for propulsion (only about 70 W per rower) and the upper limit for rowing in a fixed position is around 18 km/h (11 mph). Ancient war galleys of the kind used in Classical Greece are by modern historians considered to be the most energy-efficient and fastest of galley designs throughout history. A full-scale replica of a 5th-century BC trireme, the Olympias was built 1985–87 and was put through a series of trials to test its performance. They proved that a cruising speed of about 14 km/h (9 mph) could be maintained for an entire day of travel. Sprinting speeds of up to 18 km/h (11 mph) were possible, but only for a few minutes and would tire the crew quickly. Ancient galleys were lightly built and the original triremes are presumed never to have been surpassed in speed. Medieval galleys are believed to have been considerably slower, especially since they were not designed for ramming. A cruising speed of no more than 5 km/h (3 mph) has been estimated. A sprint speed of up to 13 km/h (8 mph) was possible for 20–30 minutes, but risked exhausting the rowers completely.

Rowing in headwinds or even moderately rough weather was difficult as well as exhausting. In high seas, ancient galleys would set sail to run before the wind. They were highly susceptible to high waves, and could become unmanageable if the projecting rowing frame (apostis) became overwhelmed by the waves. Ancient and medieval galleys are assumed to have sailed only with the wind more or less from behind for a top speed of about 15 km/h (9 mph) in fair conditions.

=== Sails ===
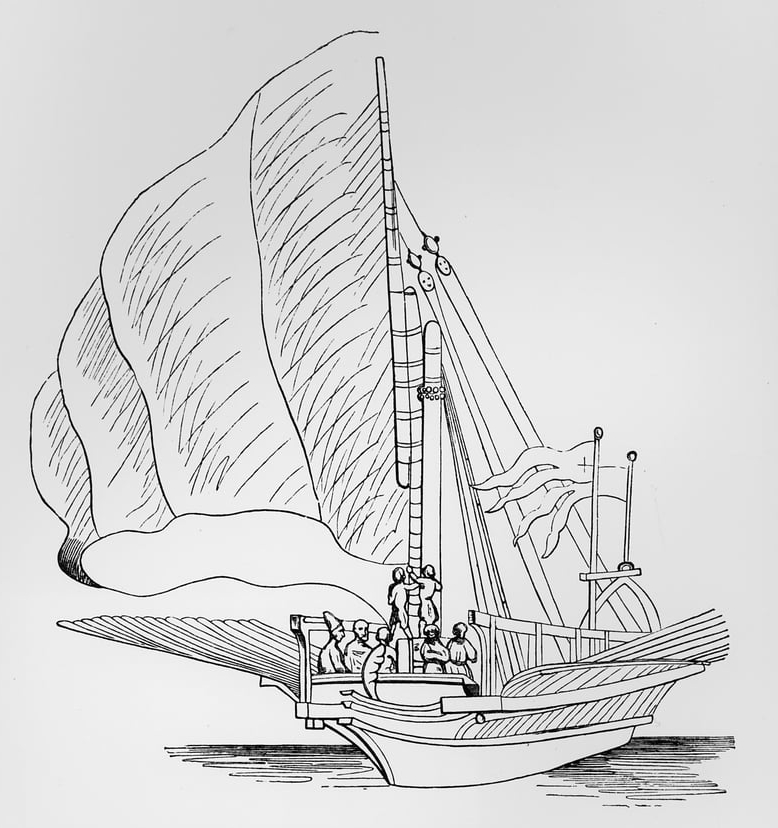
A 16th-century galley tacking. The crew is in the process of moving the long spar to the other side of the mast after raising it vertically. The sheets have been let off, the brace loosened and the large triangular lateen sail is billowing in the wind; 1884 illustration based on a sketch by Raphael.

In ancient galleys under sail, most of the motive power came from a single square sail. It was rigged on a mast somewhat forward of the center of the ship with a smaller mast carrying a head sail in the bow. Triangular lateen sails are attested as early as the 2nd century AD, and gradually became the sail of choice for galleys. By the 9th century, lateens were firmly established as part of the standard galley rig. The lateen rig required a larger crew to handle than a square sail rig, but this was not a problem in the heavily manned galleys. The Byzantine general Belisarius's invasion fleet of 533 was at least partly equipped with lateen sails, making it probable that by the time the lateen had become the standard rig for the dromon, with the traditional square sail gradually falling out of use in medieval seafaring in the Mediterranean. Unlike a square sail rig, the spar of a lateen sail did not pivot around the mast. To change tacks, the entire spar had to be raised vertically and passed to the other side of the mast. Since a lateen spar was longer than the mast itself, and not much shorter than the ship itself, this was more complex and potentially dangerous compared to tacking with a square rig.

=== Galley slaves ===
Contrary to the popular image of rowers chained to the oars, conveyed by movies such as Ben Hur, there is no evidence that ancient navies made regular use of condemned criminals or slaves as oarsmen, with the possible exception of Ptolemaic Egypt. Literary evidence indicates that both Greek and Roman navies relied on paid labor or ordinary soldiers to man their galleys. Slaves were put at the oars only in times of crisis. In some cases, these people would be given freedom after the crisis was averted. Roman merchant vessels (usually sailing vessels) were manned by slaves, sometimes even with slaves as ship's master, but this was seldom the case in merchant galleys.

It was only in the early 16th century that galley slaves became commonplace. Both galley fleets and the size of individual vessels increased in size during the early modern period, which required more rowers. The number of benches could not be increased without lengthening hulls beyond their structural limits, and more than three oars per bench was not practicable. The demand for more rowers also meant that the relatively limited number of skilled oarsmen could not keep up with the demand of the larger fleets. It became increasingly common to man galleys with convicts or slaves, which required a simpler method of rowing. The older method of employing professional rowers using the alla sensile method (one oar per rower, with two to three rower sharing the same bench) was gradually phased out in favor of a scaloccio, which required less skill. (Note: From Italian remo di scaloccio from scala, "ladder; staircase".) A single large oar was used for each bench, with several rowers working the oar together. The number of oarsmen per oar rose from three up to five and in some of the largest command galleys, there could be as many as seven to an oar.

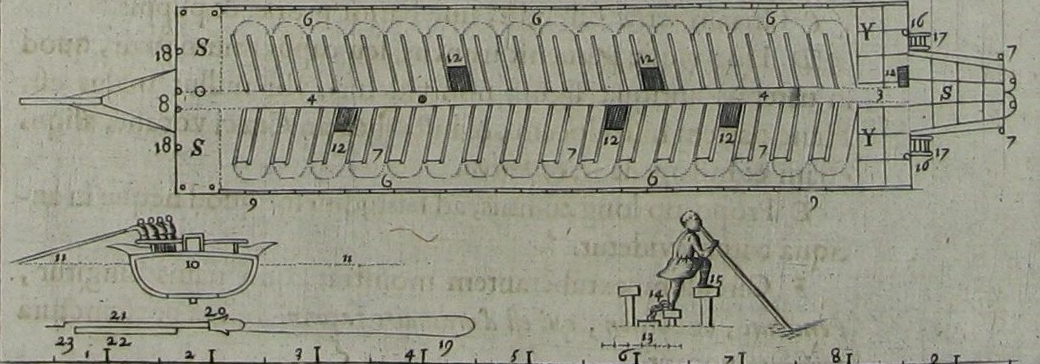
An engraving from 1643 by Claude Barthelemy Morisot showing the layout of rowing benches as well and placement of rowers on a galley with 16 pairs of oars. It also shows a rower at the top of the stroke using the standing rowing technique typical of a scaloccio rowing.

All major Mediterranean powers sentenced criminals to galley service, but initially only in time of war. Christian naval powers such as Spain frequently employed Muslim captives and prisoners of war. The Ottoman navy and its North African corsair allies put Christian prisoners to the oars in large numbers, but also mixed with volunteers. Habsburg Spain relied mostly on servile rowers, in great part because its organizational structure was geared toward employing slaves and convicts. Venice was one of few major Mediterranean powers that used almost only free rowers, a result of their reliance on alla sensile rowing which required skilled professional rowers. The Knights of Saint John used slaves extensively, as did the Papal States, Florence, and Genoa. The North African ghazi corsairs relied almost entirely on Christian slaves as rowers.

== Armament and combat tactics ==
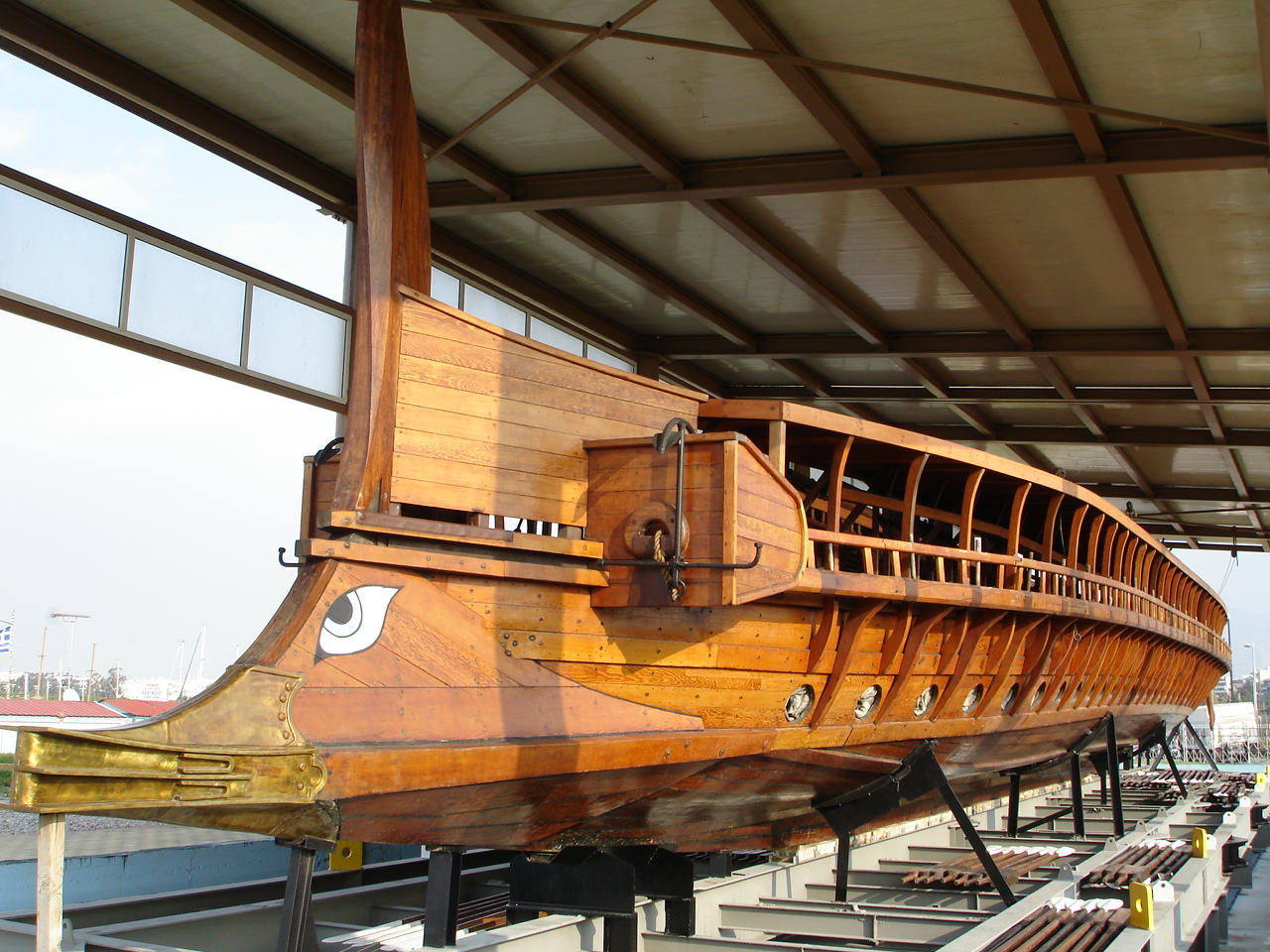
The ram bow of the trireme Olympias, a modern full-scale reconstruction of a classical Greek trireme

In the earliest times of naval warfare, boarding was the only means of deciding a naval engagement, but little to nothing is known about the tactics involved. In the first recorded naval battle, the Battle of the Delta, the battle was fought in close combat melee with the support of archers, some perched on raised platforms. The Egyptian victory was commemorated on the mortuary temple of Ramesses III at Medinet Habu and shows intense close quarters fighting and the use of grapnels thrown into the rigging to capsize ships and throwing its crew into the sea.

Around the 8th century BC, ramming began to be employed as war galleys were equipped with heavy bronze rams. Records of the Persian Wars in the early 5th century BC by the Ancient historian Herodotus (c. 484–25 BC) show that by this time ramming tactics had evolved among the Greeks. Ramming itself was done by smashing into the rear or side of an enemy ship, punching a hole in the planking. This would not actually sink an ancient galley unless it was heavily laden with cargo and stores. With a normal load, it was buoyant enough to float even with a breached hull. Breaking the enemy's oars was another way of rendering ships immobile, rendering them easier targets. If ramming was not possible or successful, the on-board complement of soldiers would attempt to board and capture the enemy vessel by securing it with grappling irons, accompanied by missile fire with arrows or javelins. Trying to set the enemy ship on fire by hurling incendiary missiles or by pouring the content of fire pots attached to long handles is thought to have been used, especially since smoke below decks would easily disable rowers.

Ramming tactics were gradually superseded in the last centuries BC by the Macedonians and Romans, both primarily land-based powers. Hand-to-hand fighting with large complements of heavy infantry supported by ship-borne catapults dominated the fighting style during the Roman era. Thought this decreased mobility of vessels, it meant that less skill was required from individual oarsmen. Fleets thereby became less dependent on highly skilled rowers with a lifetime of experience at the oar.

=== Boarding prevails ===
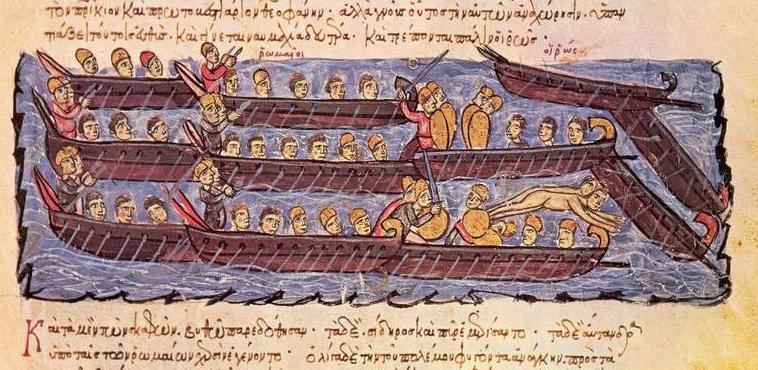
The Byzantine fleet repels the Rus' attack on Constantinople in 941. The Byzantine dromons are rolling over the Rus' vessels and smashing their oars with their spurs; Chronicle of John Skylitzes, 13th century.

By the first centuries AD, ramming tactics had completely disappeared along with the knowledge of the design of the ancient trireme. Medieval galleys instead developed a projection, or "spur", in the bow that was designed to break oars and act as a boarding platform for taking enemy ships. The only remaining examples of ramming tactics were occasional attempts to collide with enemy ships in order to destabilize or capsize them.

The Byzantine navy, the largest Mediterranean war fleet throughout most of the Early Middle Ages, employed crescent formations in order to turn the enemy's flanks, as did the Arab fleets that fought them from the 7th century onward. The initial stages in naval battles was an exchanges of missiles, ranging from combustible projectiles to arrows, caltrops, and javelins. The aim was not to sink ships, but to deplete the ranks of enemy crews before boarding, which decided the outcome. Byzantine dromons had pavesades (racks of large shields along the railings) which provided protection to the deck crew. Larger ships also had wooden castles between the masts on either side of the upper decks, which allowed archers to shoot from an elevated firing position.

Later medieval navies continued to use similar tactics, with a line abreast formation as standard, as galleys were intended to be fought from the bow. They were at their weakest along the sides, especially in the middle. The crescent formation employed by the Byzantines continued to be used throughout the Middle Ages. The ships on the edges of the crescent would attempt to crash their bows straight into the sides of the enemy ships at the edge of the formation.

=== Gun galleys ===
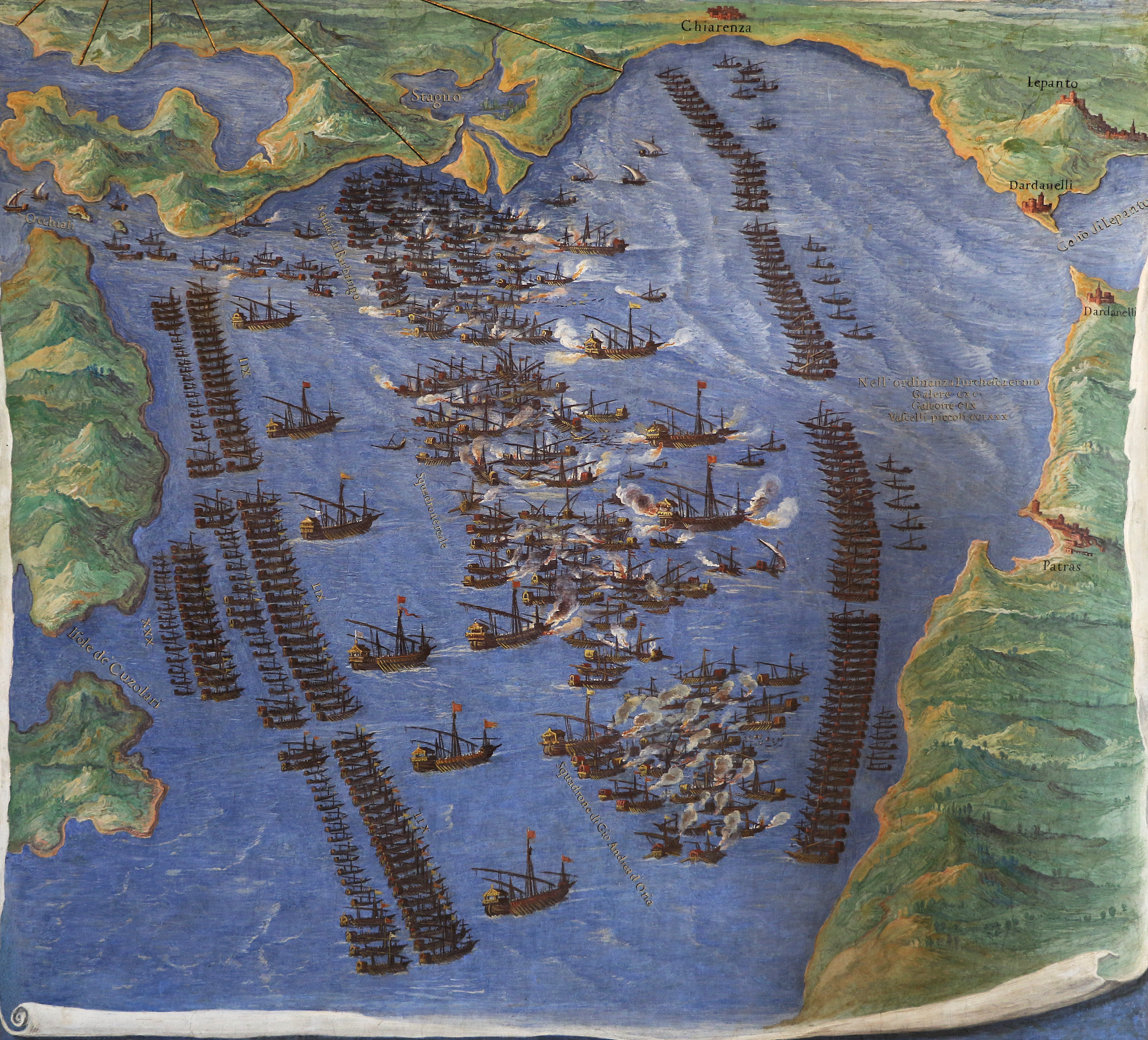
Contemporary fresco of the Battle of Lepanto in 1571 that shows the strict formations of the opposing fleets. Fresco in the Gallery of Maps in Vatican Museum.

In large-scale galley-to-galley engagements, tactics remained essentially the same until the end of the 16th century, even with the introduction of heavy guns. Since galleys could close the reliable maximum range of early naval guns faster than the guns could be reloaded, gun crews would hold their fire until the last possible moment. Shortly before impact, all available guns would fire, similar to infantry tactics in the era of short-range, inaccurate firearms. In extreme cases, such last-second discharges could kill dozens of men instantly, dealing a severe shock to the enemy. Unless one side could outmaneuver the other, lines of galleys would crash into each other head on. Individual ships would then be locked bow to bow in close formation and each ship would be fought over in close-quarters combat. As long as a vessel was not completely overrun, reinforcements could be fed into the fight from reserve vessels in the rear.

The earliest guns were of large calibers, initially of wrought iron, which made them weak compared to the cast bronze guns that would become standard in the 16th century. Early on, guns would be fixed directly to the bow timbers, aimed directly forward in the direction of travel. This placement would remain essentially the same until the galley disappeared from active service in the early 19th century. The introduction of heavy guns and handheld firearms did not change tactics considerably. If anything, it made the bow even more important in offense, both as a staging area for boarders and the obvious place for concentrating firepower. The galley itself could easily outperform most sailing vessels before the establishment of the full-rigged ship. It retained a distinct tactical advantage even after the initial introduction of naval artillery because of the ease with which it could be maneuvered to bare its guns upon an opposing vessel.

== Symbolism ==
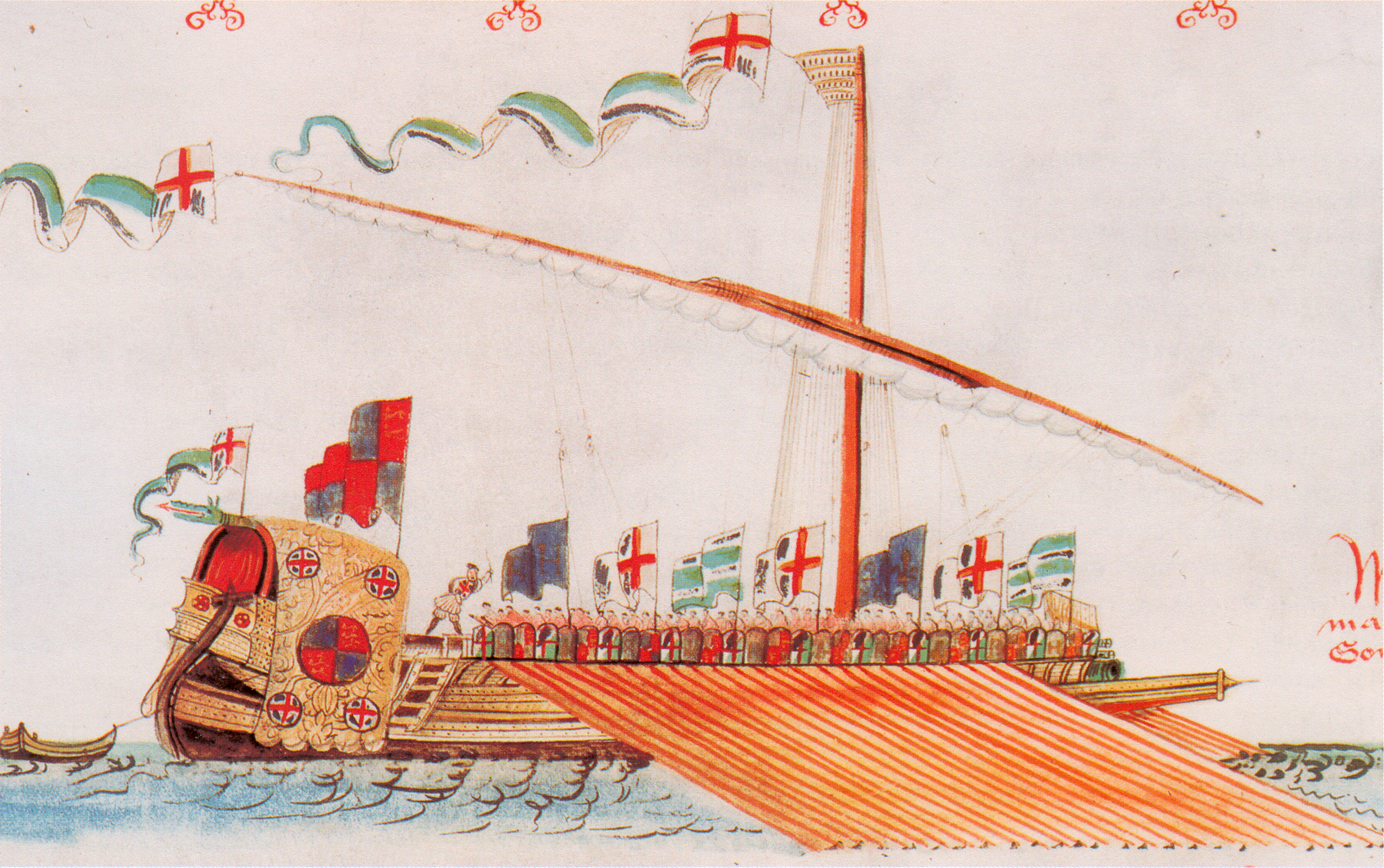
The Galley Subtle, one of the very few Mediterranean-style galleys employed by the English. This illustration is from the Anthony Roll (c. 1546) and was intended as its centerpiece.

Galleys were frequently used for ceremonial purposes. In early modern Europe, galleys enjoyed a level of prestige that sailing vessels could not compete with. They were considered to be more closely associated with warfare on land, and fought with similar tactics. Naval warfare did not have the same association with chivalry and martial prowess as land warfare, which was seen as the ultimate achievement of nobility and royalty. In the Baltic, Gustav I, the first king of the modern Swedish state, showed particular interest in galleys, as was befitting a Renaissance prince. Whenever traveling by sea, Gustav, his court, royal bureaucrats, and his bodyguard would travel by galley. Around the same time, English king Henry VIII had Mediterranean-style galleys built and even manned them with slaves, though the English navy of the time relied mostly on sailing ships.

British naval historian Nicholas Rodger has described the galley as a "supreme symbol of royal power ... derived from its intimate association with armies, and consequently with princes". This association was elevated even further by the French "Sun King", Louis XIV, in the form of a dedicated galley corps. Louis and the French state he ruled created a tool and symbol of royal authority that did little fighting, but was a potent extension of absolutist ambitions. Galleys were built to scale for the royal flotilla on the Grand Canal at the Gardens of Versailles, purely for the amusement of the court. French royal galleys patrolled the Mediterranean, forcing ships of other states to salute the King's banner, convoyed ambassadors and cardinals, and participated obediently in naval parades and royal pageantry. Historian Paul Bamford has described galleys as vessels that "must have appealed to military men and to aristocratic officers ... accustomed to being obeyed and served".

Sentencing criminals, political dissenters and religious deviants to the galleys also turned the French galley corps into a brutal, cost-effective and feared prison system. French Protestants were particularly ill-treated in this system. They were only a small minority of the prisoners, but their experiences came to dominate the legacy of the galley corps. In 1909, French author Albert Savine (1859–1927) wrote that "[a]fter the Bastille, the galleys were the greatest horror of the old regime". Long after convicts stopped serving in the galleys, even after the reign of Napoleon, the term galérien ("galley rower") remained a general term for forced labor and convicts serving harsh sentences.

== See also ==
- garay
- kelulus

== Sources ==
- Amélie Halna du Fretay (20 September 2010). "La flottille du Grand Canal de Versailles à l'époque de Louis XIV: diversité, technicité et prestige" [The flotilla of the Grand Canal of Versailles at the time of Louis XIV: diversity, technicality and prestige]. Bulletin du Centre de recherche du château de Versailles [Bulletin of the Palace of Versailles Research Center] (in French). doi:10.4000/crcv.10312. Archived from the original on 11 February 2020.
- Agius, Dionisius A (2008). Classic Ships of Islam: From Mesopotamia to the Indian Ocean. Leiden: Brill. doi:10.1163/ej.9789004158634.i-505. ISBN 978-90-474-2382-9.
- Anderson, Roger Charles (1976). Oared Fighting Ships: From Classical Times to the Coming of Steam. London: Argus Books. ISBN 0-85242-471-X.
- Bamford, Paul W (1974). Fighting Ships and Prisons: The Mediterranean Galleys of France in the Age of Louis XIV. London: Cambridge University Press. ISBN 0-8166-0655-2.
- Blomfield, R. Massie (1912). "Man-of-War Boats – II". The Mariner's Mirror. 2 (1): 7–9. doi:10.1080/00253359.1912.10654564.
- Casson, Lionel (1966). "Galley Slaves". Transactions and Proceedings of the American Philological Association. 97: 35–44. doi:10.2307/2936000. JSTOR 2936000.
- Casson, Lionel (1971). Ships and Seamanship in the Ancient World. Princeton: Princeton University Press. ISBN 0-691-03536-9.
- Casson, Lionel (1991). The Ancient Mariners: Seafarers and Sea Fighters of the Mediterranean in Ancient Times. Princeton: Princeton University Press. ISBN 0-691-06836-4.
- Dear, I. C. B; Kemp, Peter, eds. (2007). The Oxford Companion to Ships and the Sea. Oxford: Oxford University Press. ISBN 978-0-19-172750-4.
- Fernández Duro, Cesáreo (1895). Armada Española, desde la unión de los reinos de Castilla y Aragón, tomo I. Instituto de Historia Naval.
- Fernández Duro, Cesáreo (1885). El gran duque de Osuna y su marina: jornadas contra turcos y venecianos (1602-1624). Sucesores de Rivadeneyra.
- Ford, Ben; Hamilton, Donny L.; Catsambis, Alexis, eds. (2012). The Oxford Handbook of Maritime Archaeology. Oxford: Oxford University Press. ISBN 978-0-19-994049-3.
- Gardiner, Robert; Lavery, Brian, eds. (1992). The Line of Battle: Sailing Warships 1650–1840. London: Conway Maritime Press. ISBN 0-85177-561-6.
- García Hernán, Enrique; Maffi, Davide (2006). Guerra y sociedad en la monarquía hispánica: política, estrategia y cultura en la Europa Moderna, 1500-1700. Laberinto. ISBN 9781399070157.
- Gardiner, Robert; Unger, Richard W, eds. (1994). Cogs, Caravels and Galleons: The Sailing Ship 1000–1650. London: Conway Maritime Press. ISBN 0-7858-1265-2.
- Glete, Jan (1993). Navies and nations: Warships, Navies, and State Building in Europe and America, 1500–1860. Stockholm: Almqvist & Wiksell International. ISBN 91-22-01565-5.
- Glete, Jan (2000). Warfare at Sea, 1500–1650: Maritime Conflicts and the Transformation of Europe. London: Routledge. ISBN 0-415-21455-6.
- Goodman, David (1997). Spanish Naval Power, 1589–1665: Reconstruction and Defeat. Cambridge: Cambridge University Press. ISBN 0-521-52257-9.
- Guilmartin, John Francis (1974). Gunpowder and Galleys: Changing Technology and Mediterranean Warfare at Sea in the Sixteenth Century. London: Cambridge University Press. ISBN 0-521-20272-8.
- Guilmartin, John Francis (2007). "The Earliest Shipboard Gunpowder Ordnance: An Analysis of Its Technical Parameters and Tactical Capabilities". The Journal of Military History. 71 (3): 649–669. doi:10.1353/jmh.2007.0204. S2CID 162353666.
- Hattendorf, John B; Unger, Richard W, eds. (2003). War at Sea in the Middle Ages and the Renaissance. Suffolk: Woodbridge. ISBN 0-85115-903-6.
- Hattendorf, John B; Gardiner, Robert, eds. (2007). Oxford Encyclopedia of Maritime History. Oxford: Oxford University Press. ISBN 978-0-19-530740-5.
- Higgins, Courtney Rosali (2012). The Venetian Galley of Flanders: From Medieval (2-Dimensional) Treatises to 21st Century (3-Dimensional) Model (Master's thesis). Texas A&M University.
- Knighton, C.S; Loades, David M, eds. (2000). The Anthony Roll of Henry VIII's Navy: Pepys Library 2991 and British Library Additional MS 22047 with related documents. Aldershot: Ashgate Publishing. ISBN 0-7546-0094-7.
- Lehmann, L. Th (1984). Galleys in the Netherlands. Amsterdam: Meulenhoff. ISBN 90-290-1854-2.
- Liddell, Henry George; Scott, Robert (1940). A Greek–English Lexicon. Vol. 1. Oxford: Clarendon Press.
- Little, Benerson (2014). The Sea Rover's Practice: Pirate Tactics and Techniques, 1630-1730. Potomac Books. ISBN 9781597973250.
- Mark, Samuel (2008). "The Earliest Naval Ram". International Journal of Nautical Archaeology. 37 (2): 253–272. Bibcode:2008IJNAr..37..253M. doi:10.1111/j.1095-9270.2008.00182.x. S2CID 161810550.
- Mooney, James L, ed. (1959). Dictionary of American Naval Fighting Ships: Volume 4. Washington: Naval Historical Center. OCLC 1042921219.
- Morrison, John S.; Gardiner, Robert, eds. (1995). The Age of the Galley: Mediterranean Oared Vessels Since Pre-Classical Times. London: Conway Maritime Press. ISBN 0-85177-554-3.
- Morrison, John Sinclair; Coates, John F.; Rankov, Boris (2000). The Athenian Trireme: The History and Reconstruction of an Ancient Greek Warship (2nd ed.). Cambridge: Cambridge University press. ISBN 0-521-56456-5.
- Murray, William (2012). The Age of Titans: The Rise and Fall of the Great Hellenistic Navies. Oxford: Oxford University Press. ISBN 978-0-19-538864-0.
- Norman, Hans (2000). Skärgårdsflottan: uppbyggnad, militär användning och förankring i det svenska samhället 1700–1824 (in Swedish). Lund: Historiska media. ISBN 91-88930-50-5.
- Olesa-Muñido, Francisco Felipe (1968). La organización naval de los estados mediterráneos y en especial de España durante los siglos XVI y XVII. Tomo 2. Editorial Naval.
- Pryor, John H (1983). "The Naval Battles of Roger of Lauria". Journal of Medieval History. 9 (3): 179–216. doi:10.1016/0304-4181(83)90031-3.
- Pryor, John H (1988). Geography, Technology and War: Studies in the Maritime History of the Mediterranean 649–1571. Cambridge: Cambridge University Press. ISBN 0-521-42892-0.
- Pryor, John H; Jeffreys, Elizabeth (2006). The Age of the Dromon: the Byzantine Navy ca. 500–1204. Leiden: Brill. ISBN 90-04-15197-4.
- Reid, Anthony, ed. (1993). Southeast Asia in the Early Modern Era: Trade, Power, and Belief. Ithaca, NY: Cornell University Press. ISBN 978-1-5017-3217-1.
- Rodger, Nicholas A.M (1996). "The Development of Broadside Gunnery, 1450–1650". Mariner's Mirror. 82 (3): 301–324. doi:10.1080/00253359.1996.10656604.
- Rodger, Nicholas A.M (1997). The Safeguard of the Sea: A Naval History of Britain 660–1649. New York: W.W. Norton & Company. ISBN 0-393-04579-X.
- Rodríguez González, Agustín (2017). Álvaro de Bazán: Capitán general del Mar Océano. EDAF. ISBN 9788441438033.
- Rose, Susan (2002). Medieval Naval Warfare, 1000–1500. London: Routledge. ISBN 978-0-415-23977-6.
- Sargent, Rachel L (1927). "The Use of Slaves by the Athenians in Warfare". Classical Philology. 22 (3): 201–212. doi:10.1086/360887. JSTOR 263517. S2CID 162291797.
- Unger, Richard W (1980). The Ship in Medieval Economy 600–1600. London: Croom Helm. ISBN 0-85664-949-X.
- Wade, Geoff; Li, Tana, eds. (2015). Anthony Reid and the Study of the Southeast Asian Past. Singapore: Institute of Southeast Asian Studies. doi:10.1017/CHOL9780521355056. ISBN 978-1-139-05547-5.
- Winfield, Rif (2009). British Warships in the Age of Sail, 1603–1714: Design, Construction, Careers and Fates. Barnsley: Seaforth. ISBN 978-1-84832-040-6.
