= Neutorstraße (Mainz) =

Historical street in Mainz-Altstadt

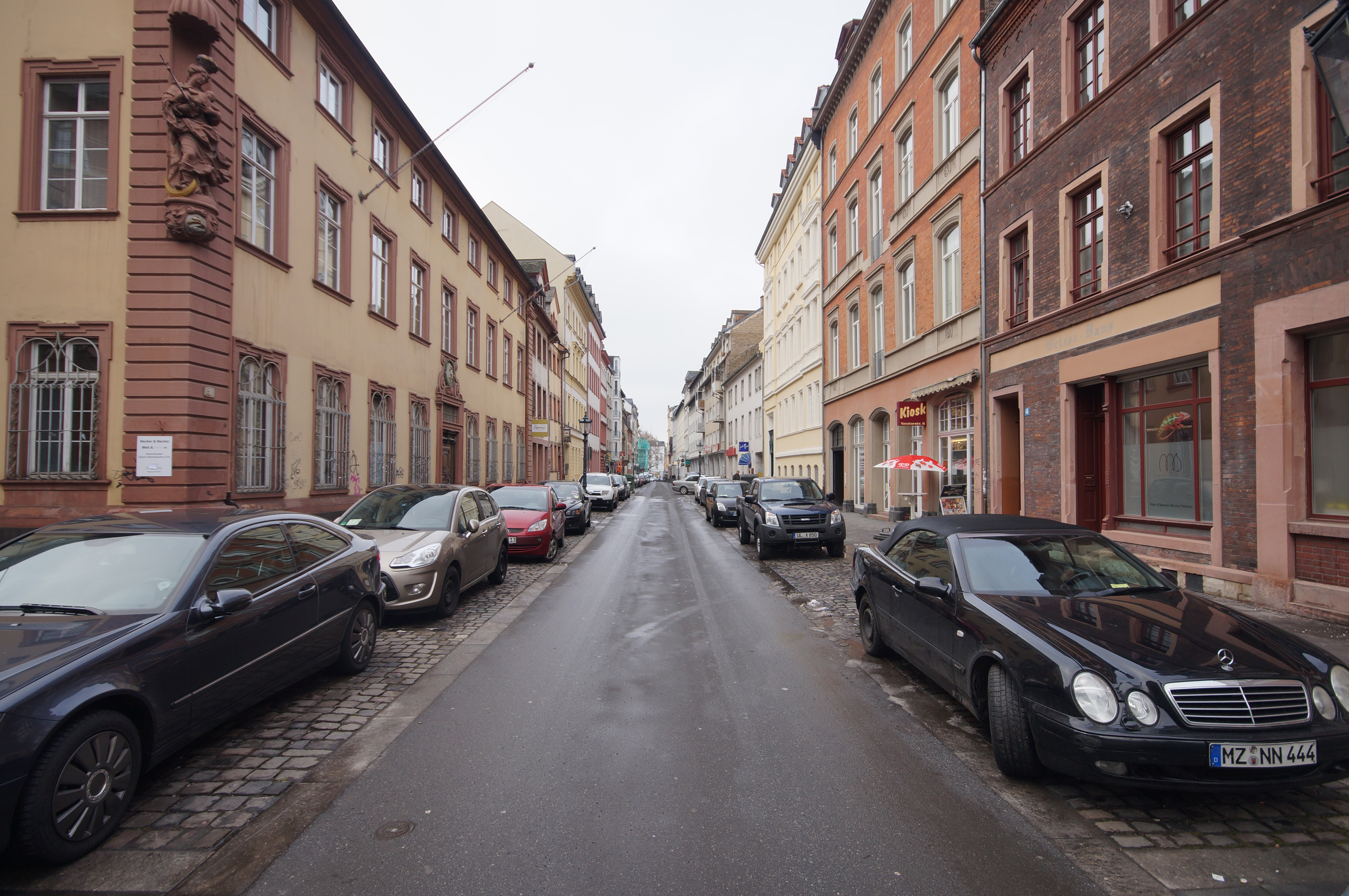
Neutorstraße in Mainz Old Town

Neutorstraße is a local road in Mainz Old Town, Germany. First mentioned in 1323, it is 520 metres long and is considered a historic preservation zone today.

== History ==
Neutorstraße in 1908: on the left, the Neutorkaserne barracks; on the right, the 'Centrale Lokomotiv-Reparaturwerkstätte' (central locomotive repair workshop) of the Hessische Ludwigsbahn railway company at Neutorstraße 2B. Today, this building houses the Museum of Ancient Seafaring.

Neutorstraße was first documented in 1323 as 'Hundsgasse', named because it ended at the Hundsturm before the bastions were constructed. The buildings at Neutorstraße 12 and Neutorstraße 25 now mark this former boundary. Until 1671, Hundsgasse was blocked by a wooden wall, preventing exit from Mainz via the alley. After the completion of the Mainz city wall and the Neutor in 1671, Neutorstraße was extended to the intersection with Dagobertstraße, allowing entry and exit. In 1699, the Neutor was slightly relocated, and extensive renovations began in the area. Many uniform houses with Baroque features, typically with three windows, were built during this period. The first residents of the modernised Neutorstraße were primarily sailors and craftsmen. A cul-de-sac was constructed on the south-western side between what are now Neutorstraße 21 and Neutorstraße 27, evidenced today only by interrupted street numbers.

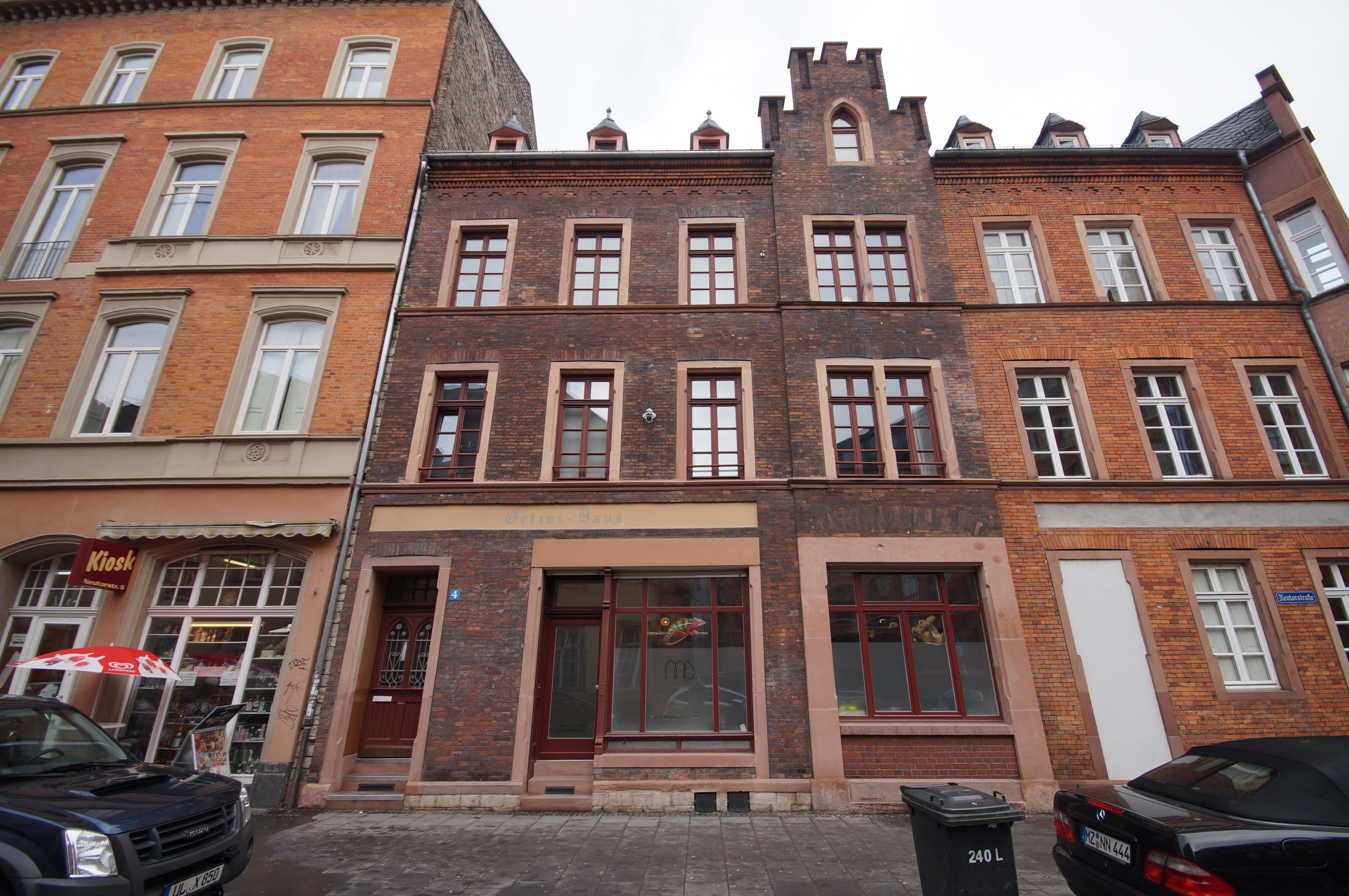
The façade of the building at Neutorstraße 4

The north-eastern side of the street remained largely undeveloped until the 19th century, as the land belonged to the Capuchin monastery in Mainz. In 1806, Eustache de Saint-Far built the Josephinenhospital on this site, and the street was briefly named 'Josephinenstraße'. By the late 19th century, the hospital was demolished, and new, elaborately designed houses were constructed for Mainz residents. These buildings, often spacious and ornate, contrasted with the narrower Baroque structures. The construction of these houses transformed the street's Baroque dominance into a blend of diverse architectural styles and art movements. The street's prominence was enhanced by its above-average width, established during 19th-century construction.

== Architecture ==
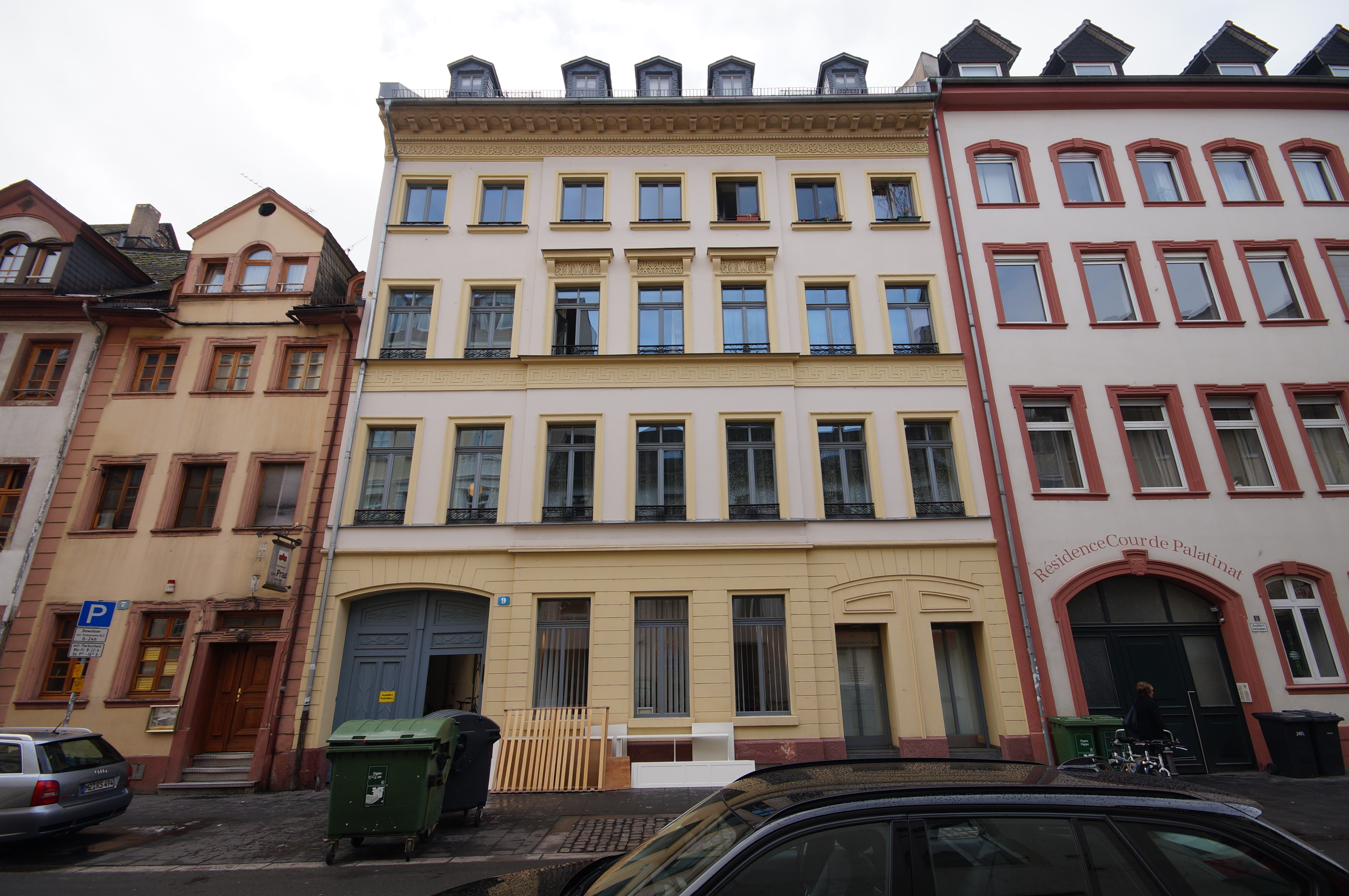
The house at Neutorstraße 9

The most architecturally striking section of Neutorstraße lies in its southern and central parts. The buildings at Neutorstraße 3 to 7, 9, 11, and 13, as well as Dagobertstraße 1 to 7, stand out for their design and decoration. The alternation of architectural styles and building sizes is particularly notable. The house at Neutorstraße 3, named "Zu den drei Mohren", built in 1710, resembles a noble palace in structure but was a bourgeois residence. Nearby, numerous other 18th-century townhouses are equally imposing. From 1835, several buildings were constructed in the classical style, followed by structures in the Gründerzeit architectural style, with Neutorstraße 11 as a prime example. In 1737, three houses were demolished to make way for the Pfälzer Hof, which was restored and extended in 1870.

The eastern side of the street, developed in 1860, forms an architectural unit with Dagobertstraße to the south, marking the former southern boundary of Mainz's old town. The houses built in the late 19th century share stylistic similarities with those on Neutorstraße. The development and condition of this historic district reflect the growth and destruction of Mainz's city centre. Neutorstraße is connected to Mainz city centre by Augustinerstraße.

== See also ==
- List of cultural monuments in Mainz Old Town
- Neutorstraße
