= Madrague de Giens (shipwreck) =

Coordinates: 43°2′N 06°6′E

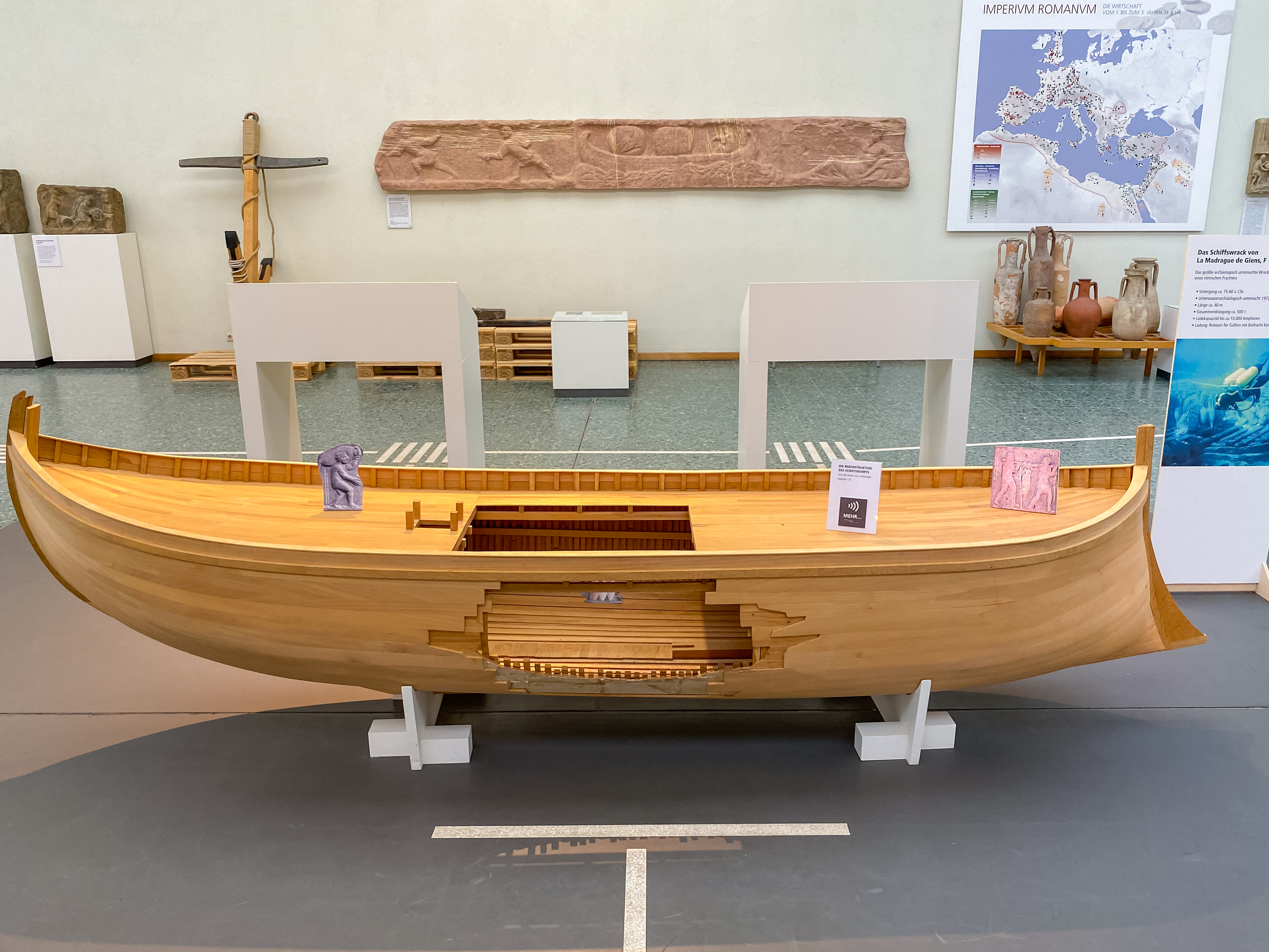
- Model of the Madrague de Giens wreck, at the Museum of Ancient Seafaring, Germany

History

Rome
- Name: Madrague de Giens
- Out of service: 75-60 BCE
- Fate: shipwrecked

General characteristics
- Type: Ponto, myriophoroi, merchantman
- Tonnage: 400 tons
- Displacement: 520 tons
- Length: 40 m (130 ft)
- Beam: 9 m (30 ft)
- Depth: 4.5 m (15 ft)
- Capacity: 5,800-8,000 amphorae

Discovered by divers from the French Navy Diving School in 1967, the archaeological investigations of the Roman wreck at Madrague de Giens which lies at around 18 to 20 metres depth off the coast of the small fishing port of La Madrague de Giens on the Giens Peninsula, east of Toulon, on the southern Mediterranean coast of France. Sank around 75–60 BCE, the vessel was found to be "a large merchantman of considerable tonnage—400 tons deadweight with a displacement of around 550 tons", making it one of the largest Roman wrecks excavated, with only the wreck at Albenga, Italy (around 600 tons deadweight) exceeding it at the time of its discovery. The vessel wrecked at Madrague de Giens measured around 40 metres in length; has a "wine glass" section which would have given better ability to sail to windward; displayed extended raking of the stem and stern; and had two masts. The hull was characterised by a reverse stempost in the shape of a ram with a big cutwater which "must have given... [the] craft high-performance sailing qualities". The ship sank while transporting a large cargo of wine and black glazed pottery from Italy. It is not known why it sank.

== Archaeological investigation ==
In the summer of 1972 a team of maritime archaeologists of the Archaeological Institute, run jointly in Aix-en-Provence (France) by the University of Provence and the Centre National de la Recherche Scientifique (National Centre for Scientific Research or CNRS) began what was planned as three years of work on the recently discovered Roman wreck at Madrague de Giens. The archaeological investigations would end up running for 11 seasons, only concluding in 1982, and are notable for first utilising a number of archaeological techniques still used in underwater excavation. Unbeknownst to the team of diver-archaeologists who first began documenting the wreck, the Madrague de Giens vessel would soon be revealed as one of the "largest ancient ships whose remains have ever been found under the sea".

Throughout the excavations the team was led by Andre Tchernia, France's "first director of research in underwater archaeology" and then assistant director of CNRS, and Patrice Pomey, a maritime archaeologist.

The first four years of excavations, undertaken from 1972 to 1975 (with the results published in 1978), focused on the central area of the ship. These excavations established the approximate age of the wreck (around the middle of first century BCE) and determined the cargo the ship was carrying at the time of its sinking. They also helped in determining the origin of the cargo - amphorae from Terracina, Italy and Campanian ceramics and pottery.

From 1976 to 1982 excavations focused on the other parts of the wreck not uncovered in previous seasons. The 1976 to 1979 campaigns primarily involved the stern which had been well preserved under 2 to 3 metre deep sediment. Once uncovered, the stern, which is one of the largest and most complete of all Roman wrecks, revealed important information about the construction of the ship. In 1980 focus shifted to the front of the ship. A 4-metre unexcavated area, deemed to be of little interest and not worth the time it would take to excavate, was left between the centre and stern of the wreck as the archaeologists moved to the extreme front of the ship.

The stern was abandoned in favour of the bow as what had already been uncovered suggested that parallels might possibly be made between the Madrague de Giens wreck and classical iconography and the archaeologists wished to explore this further. With the bow uncovered it was clear that the shape and proportions of the ship were indeed similar to images created at the time of its wrecking, particularly that of the Ocean God mosaic in the Themetra baths in Tunisia.

With the extreme front of the ship recorded, archaeologists moved back towards the centre of the wreck, beginning at the rearmost portion of the 'front' section and working forwards. Throughout the excavations it was discovered that the site may have been heavily impacted by divers who had salvaged from the wreck. After analysis it was concluded that most, if not all, of the salvage operations most likely occurred not long after the ship was wrecked. It appeared that almost half the amphorae had been removed and the site was strewn with rocks (which were most likely used by free divers) from the Giens peninsula.

By the end of excavations in 1982 almost all of the wreck had been uncovered, revealing a ship with a concavely profiled bow and a convex stern; a sharp, prominent keel; two masts; and a heavy cargo load, a shape well attested by iconography but not common in the Roman world.

=== Excavation techniques ===
The excavation of the wreck at Madrague de Giens utilised a number of archaeological techniques common in underwater archaeology. Using an air pump objects were carefully extricated and recorded before they were removed. Important artefacts, including each amphora, had a number attached to them. These numbers were designed to be clearly visible throughout excavation and to remain as cataloguing numbers through processing and the eventual storage of the recovered items. Comprehensive stereoscopic photographic recording was undertaken across the site at a number of levels and the hull was carefully examined and partly dismantled to determine how it was built.

Studying the hull called for the most spectacular measures. In order to examine the keel and take samples from it, it was necessary to dig a tunnel under the hull and to use underwater chain-saws. The fragments removed were taken apart and studied trenail by trenail on land, then reassembled exactly as before and returned to their place in the wreck.

After excavation concluded in 1982 the wreck at Madrague de Giens was reburied in sand and left on the seabed.

=== Archaeological significance ===
The wreck at Madrague de Giens is significant not only because it is one of the largest Roman vessels ever discovered, but because it also reveals important information about Roman art. During the excavations Pomey created a detailed, scale plan of the hull which he then compared with a selection of images showing ships from around the same time period as the wreck. He discovered that in several mosaics the proportions and shapes were identical to his own plans, suggesting three things: firstly, that mosaics "represent ancient ships with much more realism and accuracy than might be supposed"; secondly, that the deteriorated, destroyed or lost parts of the Madrague de Giens wreck (such as the rigging) were likely similar to those displayed in the images; and thirdly, based on the date ranges of the comparable mosaics, "that this type of ship was built to a virtually identical pattern for more than three centuries".

== Ship construction ==
The dimensions of Madrague de Giens portray a tall two-masted merchant ship with an estimated displacement of 520 tons implying a total cargo weight of 400 tons, one of the two or three largest ancient ships to be found underwater. It was known as a myriophoroi, capable of carrying 10,000 amphorae. An alternative proposed estimate of the size of the ship, which modelled the likely hull lines, gives a cargo carrying capacity of 320 tons, which equates to 6,400 amphoras.

A sharp bottom and prominent keel create a “wine glass” shaped hull with, consequently, significant lateral resistance. A strongly curved hull profile and the depth of the keel reduced leeway, so indicating that this ship was designed to have better windward performance than many of its contemporaries. This hull design is characterized by a reverse stempost with a cutwater, enabling the vessel to compensate for its large, non-specialized, powerful square sails and giving it speed.

A schematic of the mortise and tenon technique for shipbuilding that dominated the Mediterranean until the 7th century BC.

The vessel contained framing composed of various elements (keel, fore foot, stempost, cutwater, sternpost, inner post, false post), double planking (assembled entirely by mortise-and-tenon joints pegged from the inside) and was covered with a sheet of lead. What is referred to as a large keelson is actually a 7.5m long mast-step timber made of oak which doubles the axial frame. The stringers, nailed onto the frames, reinforced the hull longitudinally. Regularly alternated floor timbers and half frames comprised the framing of the vessel. The wreck indicates the vessel was about 40m long (35.10m remains preserved on the seabed), 9m wide, and 4.5m deep with a length-to-beam coefficient of 4.4(if L=40m, L/W=4.4). This coefficient of elongation-rate of length to width allows the ship to be much faster than those with a lower coefficient.

The vessel was built by a method of construction known as shell-first or plating, meaning that the frame was built first with the later addition of a skeleton. It was, however, not built entirely shell-first, but involved some elements of skeleton or frame-first construction. The keel, extended by a long fore foot ending with a concave stempost tilted towards the back, was laid first, then edge jointed by mortise (10 to 12 cm deep and 8 cm wide) and tenon (20 to 22 cm long, 8 cm wide, and 1.5 cm thick), construction to three strakes. This first section of the ship, the keel and the first three planks, was made from elm. Floor timbers were then bolted directly to the keel, giving greater rigidity to the internal skeleton. Next, the rest of the framing was added, joined with straight nails and treenails. These few early frames acted as guides and supports during construction. Then, the rest of the planking was added, the lower skeleton first, followed by the upper shell (independent of the frames, with treenails inserted from inside the hull). Futtocks were inserted last and a second skin of thinner planks of fir was fitted to the exterior of the ship and covered in lead. A layer of planks, 6 cm thick, was also fitted inside in order to cover the internal frames, strengthening the hull through double planking and elaborate, complex keel scarves. A massive cutwater, over a length of 1.45m, placed against the front-butt protected and strengthened the stern of the axial frame.

Unusually, for a Mediterranean ship dated to classical antiquity, the hull was largely built of hardwoods. The only significant softwood element is the outer skin of the hull planking. The inner (and main) planking layer is of elm, which was also used for the keel, ceiling and other hull framework components. The mast step is of oak and most of the futtocks are walnut.

The structure of the ship's hull is a good example of the edge-to-edge mortised and tenoned hull planking providing much of the hull's strength. The sectional dimensions of the frames are not of appreciably greater than, for instance, those of the Kyrenia ship, a vessel of a third of the overall length and much less cargo capacity. The double layer of planking also contributes additional hull strength, as do the internal stringers. This contrasts with the structural design concepts of carvel construction, which saw a slow and complex development in the first millennium AD. Carvel relies largely on the underlying framework of the hull for its strength, whilst ships like the Madrague de Giens vessel had an internal framework that simply provided additional reinforcement.

The deck or ship superstructure has not survived, although a baulk of timber and its supports as found, fitted carefully onto the lowest frames of the hull. This mast-step timber indicates sockets that correspond to a main mast, a foremast, of a bilge pump well, and of various interior architectural characteristics. Kept at a height of 1.10m above the floor of the hold, this well was 1.5m long by 1.25m wide and consisted of four vertical supporting cross-coated plates.

== Cargo ==
Dressel 1B type amphora Key : 1 : rim - 2 : neck - 3 : handle - 4 : shoulder - 5 : belly or body - 6 : foot

The cargo found amongst the wreck site indicates that the wreck at Madrague de Giens belongs to a large Roman merchant vessel. The ship was capable of carrying anywhere between 5800 and 8,000 amphorae, each weighing 50 kilos, a freight of up to 400 tons. Four layers of wine amphorae, stacked in staggered rows, was the typical cargo, but on the final trip, the ship was only holding three layers (6,000-6,500 amphorae) reaching 3m high. Dressel Type 1B, 1.16 m (3 ft 10 in)] high, amphorae with narrow pointed bodies and long cylindrical necks made by the potter Publius Veveius Papus made up the majority of the wine amphorae. Potter's stamps belonging to Publius Veveius Papus have been found on these amphorae indicating that they were an export from Terracina, a wine-producing area in Southern Italy, where he is known to have had a workshop. Various other types of amphorae were found, which may have been for on board consumption or alternatively may have been additional cargo.

The ship of Madrague de Giens was only carrying three layers of amphorae due to the fact that it was also carrying a large load of ceramics, which was placed on top of the amphorae. This extra cargo contained black-glazed ceramics (Campanian) and coarser kitchen wares. The presence of kitchen wares, table wares, and other various objects indicated the cabin area near the stern of the ship.

== See also ==
- Underwater archaeology
- Maritime archaeology
- Classical archaeology
- Archaeology of shipwrecks
- Shipwrecks
- Roman navy
