= Actuaria =

Type of merchant ship used in the Roman Empire

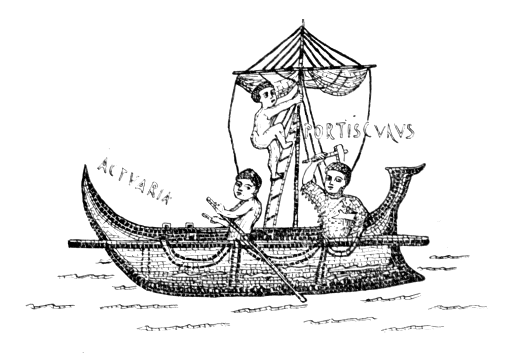
Reproduction of a 3rd-century depiction of an actuaria from the Altiburus mosaic. The figure towards the bow of the ship is beating the time for the rowers with a mallet.

An actuaria (plural: actuariae; a short form of navis actuaria, "ship that moves") was a type of merchant galley used primarily for trade and transport throughout the Roman Empire. In Greek, it was also known by the term akatos (ἄκατος; plural: akatoi). The actuaria was equipped with sails as well as oars.

Variants of the actuaria were used as troop transports, for example in the invasion of Britain. In 47 BC, Publius Vatinius equipped actuariae at Brindisi with temporary rams to support Julius Caesar's forces in Illyricum, on the other side of the Adriatic, though these were only suitable to combat smaller enemy vessels. Actuariae were also employed along the major rivers by Germanicus in his campaigns against the Germanic tribes around 16 AD.

A warship derivative of the actuaria known as a qit'a was possibly used by Arab fleets as late as the 8th century.

== Description ==
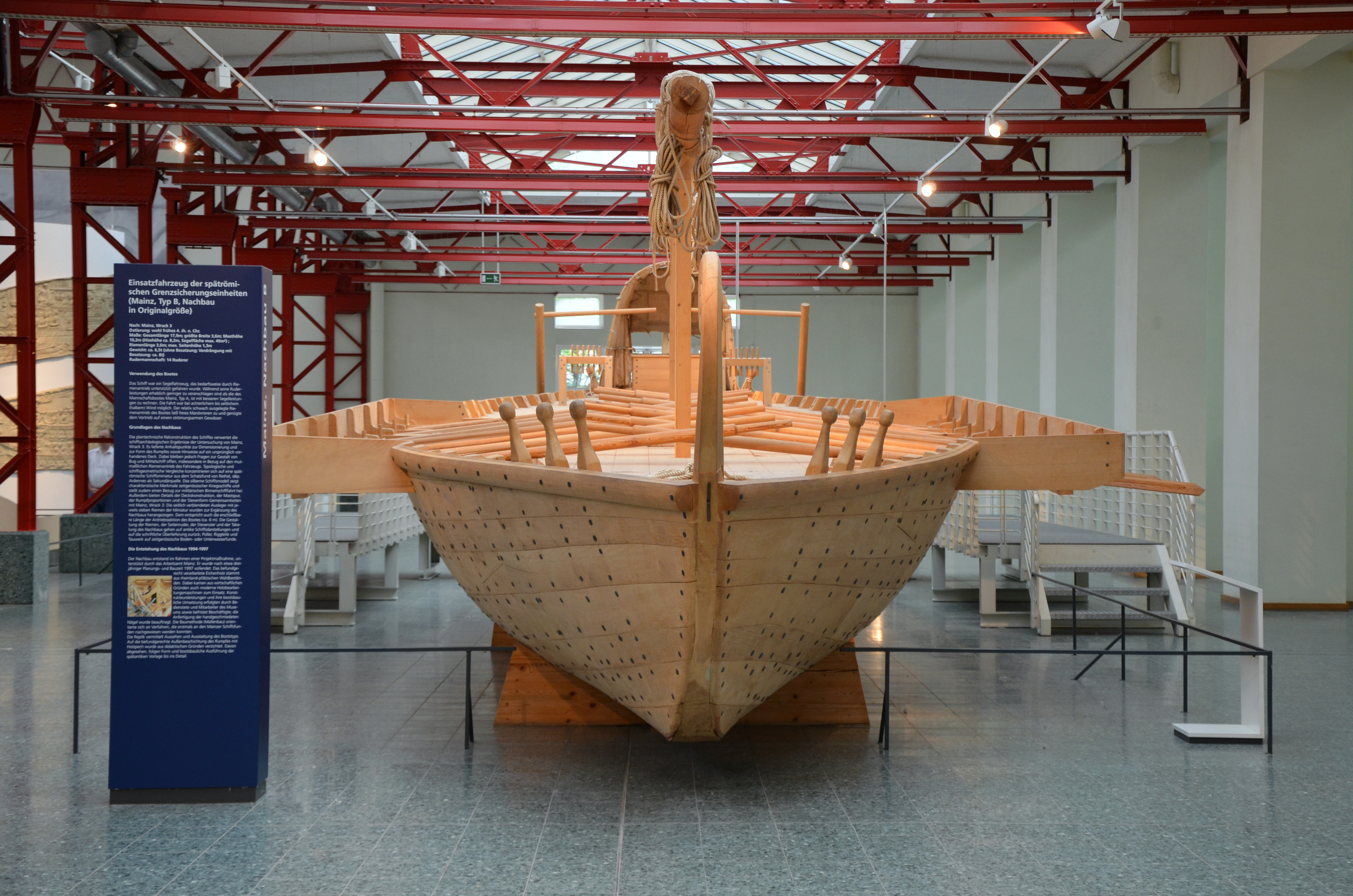
Full scale replica of an actuaria.

It had a flat-bottomed hull, which allowed the ship to unload on beaches, without the need to dock at a port. Actuaria used a dual marine propulsion and up to 30 oars, for heightened mobility. It also had a low draft, enabling easier navigation along shallow rivers. The actuaria used double-ended rudders, one at the bow and one at the stern.

== Uses ==
This type of ship was used where speed and reliability were prioritized. It could carry both passengers and wares such as honey, cheese, meat, and even live animals intended for gladiator combat. The actuaria was also used for passenger transport when it could be afforded, as it was faster and more reliable than a regular sailing ship. As well as being used as troop transport by Roman generals like Julius Caesar, they were also sometimes used as patrol vessels. One ship of this nature was the Type B, which was used for border control along the Rhine, during the late 3rd century AD.

== See also ==
- Navis lusoria
- Ships of ancient Rome

== Bibliography ==
- Morrison, John S. & Gardiner, Robert (editors), The Age of the Galley: Mediterranean Oared Vessels Since Pre-Classical Times. Conway Maritime, London, 1995
- Viereck, Hans D. L., Die römische Flotte: Classis Romana. Koehler, Herford, 1975. ISBN 378220106X.
