= Liburna =

Roman galley

A liburna was a type of small galley used for raiding and patrols. Originally utilized by the Liburnians, a pirate tribe from Dalmatia, it later became a staple of the Roman navy.

== History ==
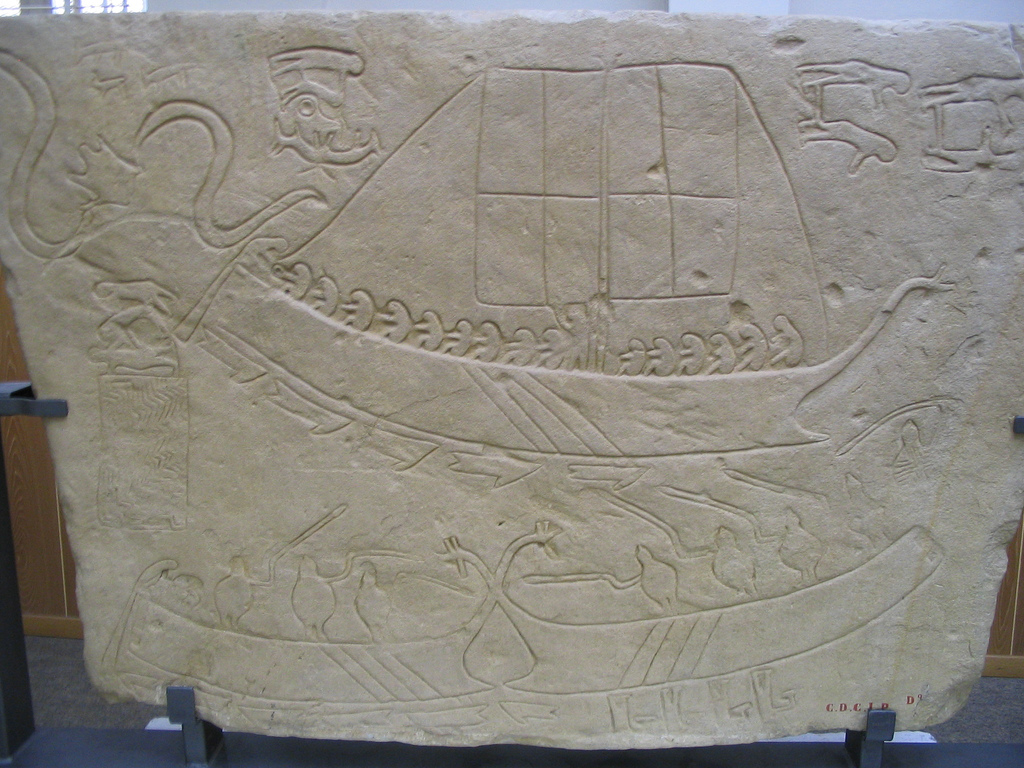
Battle between Liburnian and Picenian vessels depicted on the Novilara tablets (6th/5th century BCE).

A stone tablet (Stele di Novilara) discovered near ancient Pisaurum (now Pesaro) depicts a liburna in the midst of a naval battle. Dating back to the fifth or sixth century BCE, the image likely portrays a fictional clash between the Liburnian and Picene fleets. The liburna is depicted as a light vessel with a single row of oars, one mast, one sail, and a prow curving outward. Beneath the prow, a rostrum was installed for striking enemy ships below the waterline.

Initially resembling the ancient Greek penteconter, the liburna featured a single bench with 25 oars on each side. However, during the late Roman Republic, it evolved into a bireme with two rows of oars, maintaining its superior speed, agility, and maneuverability compared to triremes. The Romans adopted the liburna design, making it a vital component of the Roman navy, possibly through influence from the Macedonian navy in the latter half of the 1st century BCE. Liburnae played a pivotal role in the Battle of Actium in Greece (31 BCE), cementing the ascent of Augustus as the unrivaled ruler of the Roman Empire.

The design of the liburna distinguished it from battle triremes, quadriremes, and quinqueremes. It measured 109 ft (33 m) in length, 5 m (16 ft) in width, with a draft of 1 m (3 ft 3 in). With two rows of oarsmen, each side had 18 oars. Under sail, the ship could achieve speeds of up to 14 knots, while rowing allowed for speeds exceeding 7 knots.

Such a vessel, also employed as a merchantman, might carry passengers, as recounted by Lycinus in the second-century dialogue Love Affairs (§6), traditionally attributed to Lucian: "I had a speedy vessel readied, the kind of bireme used above all by the Liburnians of the Ionian Gulf."

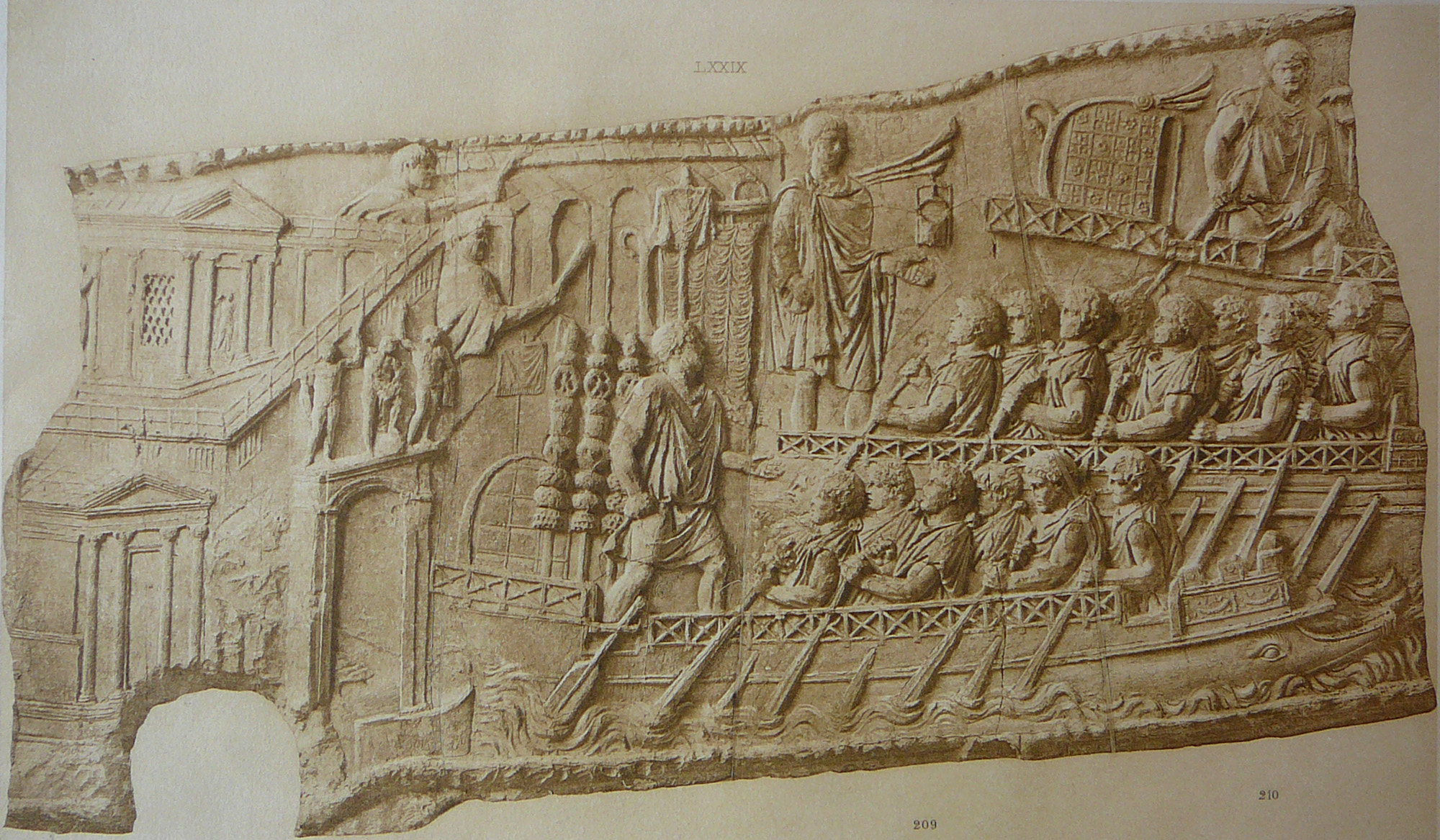
Roman bireme warships, likely liburnae, from the Danube fleet during Trajan's Dacian Wars.

After adopting the liburna, the Romans made modifications to incorporate rams and missile protection, enhancing its suitability for naval use. These enhancements offset the slight reduction in speed. Additionally, the regular Roman military unit needed simplification to ensure smoother operation of the ships. Each ship functioned independently, eliminating the need for the more complex organizational structure typically employed. It is likely that within the navy, liburnae of various sizes were utilized for specific tasks such as scouting and patrolling Roman waters against piracy. The Romans predominantly employed the liburna within the provinces of the empire, where these ships formed the core of the fleets. Small numbers of liburnae were also integrated into the fleets of Ravenna and Misenum, where many Illyrians, particularly Dalmatae, Liburnians, and Pannonians, served.

Gradually, liburna became a generic term for various types of Roman ship, including cargo vessels in late antiquity. Tacitus and Suetonius used it interchangeably with "battleship". Inscriptions listed it last among classes of battleship: hexeres, penteres, quadrieres, trieres, liburna.

The liburna lent its name to a natural cove on the west coast of Tuscany. Over time, the cove's name evolved into Livorna and later Livorno—the name of a significant port city that emerged at the site long after the disappearance of this type of ship.

== See also ==
- Ships of ancient Rome

== General and cited references ==
- Casson, Lionel (1971). Ships and Seamanship in the Ancient World. Princeton, NJ: Princeton University Press. ISBN 0783705646.
- Gabriel, Richard A. (2007). "The Roman Navy: Masters of the Mediterranean". Military History. 29 (9): 36–43.
- Morrison, J. S.; Coates, J. F. (1996). Greek and Roman Warships 399–30 B.C. Oxford: Oxford University Press.
- Starr, Chester G. (1941). The Roman Imperial Navy 31 B.C. – A.D. 324. Ithaca, NY: Cornell University Press.
- Zaninović, M. (1988). "Liburnia Militaris". Opusc. Archeol. 13: 43–67.
