= Navis lusoria =

Small military vessel of the late Roman Empire that served as a troop transport

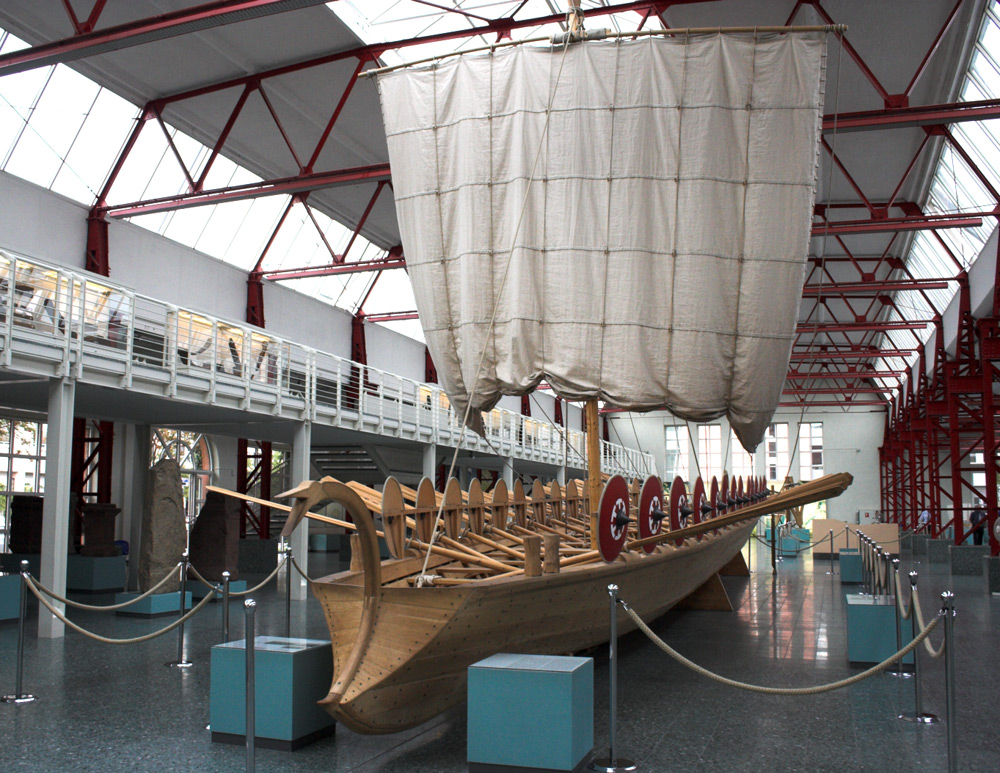
A reconstructed navis lusoria at the Museum of Ancient Seafaring, Mainz

A lusoria (short form of navis lusoria from Latin '"dancing/playful ship"', plural naves lusoriae) was type of a small military vessel of the late Roman Empire that served as a troop transport. It was powered by about thirty soldier-oarsmen and an auxiliary sail. Nimble, graceful, and of shallow draft, such a vessel was used on northern rivers close to the Limes Germanicus, the Germanic border, and thus saw service on the Rhine and the Danube. The Roman historian Ammianus Marcellinus mentioned the navis lusoria in his writings, but not much about it could be learned until the discovery of such boats at Mainz, Germany in 1981–82.

== The Roman ships of Mainz ==
In November 1981, during excavation in the course of a construction of a Hilton Hotel at Mainz, wooden remains were found and identified as parts of an old ship. Before construction resumed three months later, the site yielded remnants of five ships that were dated to the 4th century using dendrochronology. The wrecks were measured, taken apart and, in 1992, brought to the Museum of Ancient Seafaring (German: Museum für Antike Schifffahrt) of the Romano-Germanic Central Museum (Römisch-Germanisches Zentralmuseum) for further preservation and study.

Scientifically the wrecks were termed "Mainz 1" through "Mainz 5" and generally referred to as the "Mainzer Römerschiffe" (the Mainz Roman ships). They were identified as military vessels that belonged to the Roman flotilla in Germania, the Classis Germanica. The vessels could be classified into two types, namely small troop transports (Mainz 1, 2, 4, 5) termed navis lusoria and a patrol vessel (Mainz 3). The lusoria is narrower than the actuaria, an earlier and wider type of Roman cargo vessel.

=== Reconstruction ===
A full-sized reconstructed vessel is on display at the Museum of Ancient Seafaring, Mainz, and serves as a representative of the lusoria. For the reconstruction of this vessel specifically Mainz 1 and 5 served as templates. The replica measures 21.0 by 2.8 m (68 ft 11 in by 9 ft 2 in) while the gunwale measures 0.96 m (3 ft 2 in). Again oak is used. The planks are 2 cm (0.8 in) thick, generally 25 cm (10 in) long and are carvel-built. The keel is only 5 cm (2 in) thick and constructed of planks; it contains a central channel to collect water. There is no keelson. The frames are placed 33.5 cm (13.2 in) apart corresponding to the measuring unit of a pes Drusianus. The frames hold the ship together. The mastframe contains a hole to place the mast. While the ship could be sailed, the main method of propulsion was rowing by one open row of oarsmen on each side. The gunwale displays an outside fender and is topped by a covering board. The covering board contains the support for the oars. The protective effect of the gunwales is further extended by the shields of the soldiers which were hung on the outside. Boats were steered by a double rudder aft. Sails have not survived the centuries, so their reconstruction relies on ancient depictions. A lusoria was crewed by the steersman, two men to handle the sail, and about 30 soldiers who manned the oars.

It has been calculated that the narrow and relatively long lusoria could attain a travel speed of 11 to 13 km/h (6 to 7 kn) and a maximum speed of 18 km/h (10 kn).

The significance of the findings led to the establishment of a specific research center to study Roman ship transport at the Romano-Germanic Central Museum and of the Museum of Ancient Seafaring as its parent division. The latter museum has been in operation since 1994 and displays replicas of the lusoria and the patrol vessel as well as original artefacts. It specializes in Roman shipbuilding and ship transport, in the Germanic provinces and in the whole empire.

== Historical background ==
After the establishment of the military castrum (fort) of Mogontiacum (modern Mainz) in 13–12 BC, ships of the Classis Germanica became stationed at its harbor. Mogontiacum soon became the capital of the Roman province of Germania Superior and ships from its harbor could travel up and down the Rhine and east to the Main river. The military fleet was upgraded when the Emperor Julian increased defensive measures along the Rhine in the 4th century, and Marcellinus reported that the Emperor had 40 lusoriae that were used for his troops at Mogontiacum. At that time the border was increasingly threatened, and lusoriae became useful to ship troops to outposts or to points of crisis. Eventually however, Vandals, Suebi, and Alans moved across the Rhine and sacked Mogontiacum in or about 407. As Roman control ended, the local Roman fleet decayed and, over time, became covered with debris, mud and earth.

== Other reconstructions ==
The Regina is a reconstruction of a lusoria by students of the Department for Ancient History of the University of Regensburg. Launched in 2004, the boat was used to test its abilities in numerous trips along the Naab and Danube. In 2006, the Regina travelled from Regensburg to Budapest covering distances of up to 100 km (54 nmi) per day confirming that the vessel was speedy and demonstrating the great mobility the military could achieve by its use.

== Literature ==
- Hans Ferkel, Heinrich Konen, Christoph Schäfer (Hrsg.): Navis lusoria. Ein Römerschiff in Regensburg. Scripta-Mercaturae-Verl., St. Katharinen 2004, ISBN 3-89590-152-0.
- Christoph Schäfer: Lusoria. Ein Römerschiff im Experiment. Rekonstruktion, Tests, Ergebnisse. Koehler, Hamburg 2008, ISBN 978-3-7822-0976-2 (Information, in German).
- Ronald Bockius: Die spätrömischen Schiffswracks aus Mainz. Schiffsarchäologisch-technikgeschichtliche Untersuchungen spätantiker Schiffsfunde vom nördlichen Oberrhein. Verlag des Römisch-Germanischen Zentralmuseums Mainz, Mainz 2006, ISBN 978-3-7954-1965-3 (Monographien des Römisch-Germanischen Zentralmuseums Mainz. Band 67).
- Barbara Pferdehirt: Das Museum für antike Schifffahrt. Ein Forschungsbericht des Römisch-Germanischen Zentralmuseums. Römisch-Germanisches Zentralmuseum, Mainz 1995, ISBN 3-88467-033-6.
