= Giens Peninsula =

Peninsula on the French Mediterranean coast

Coordinates: 43°02′02″N 6°08′27″E

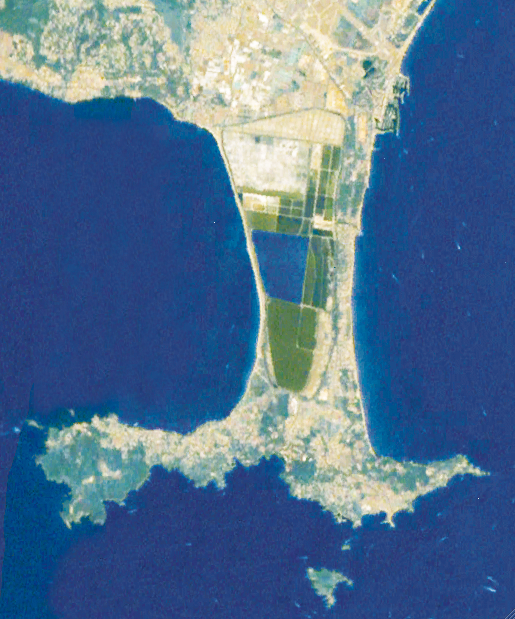
Seen from the air

The Giens Peninsula (French: Presqu'île de Giens, French pronunciation: [pʁɛskil də ʒjɛ̃]) is a peninsula on the French Mediterranean coast near Hyères in the Var department in the Provence-Alpes-Côte d'Azur region in southeastern France.

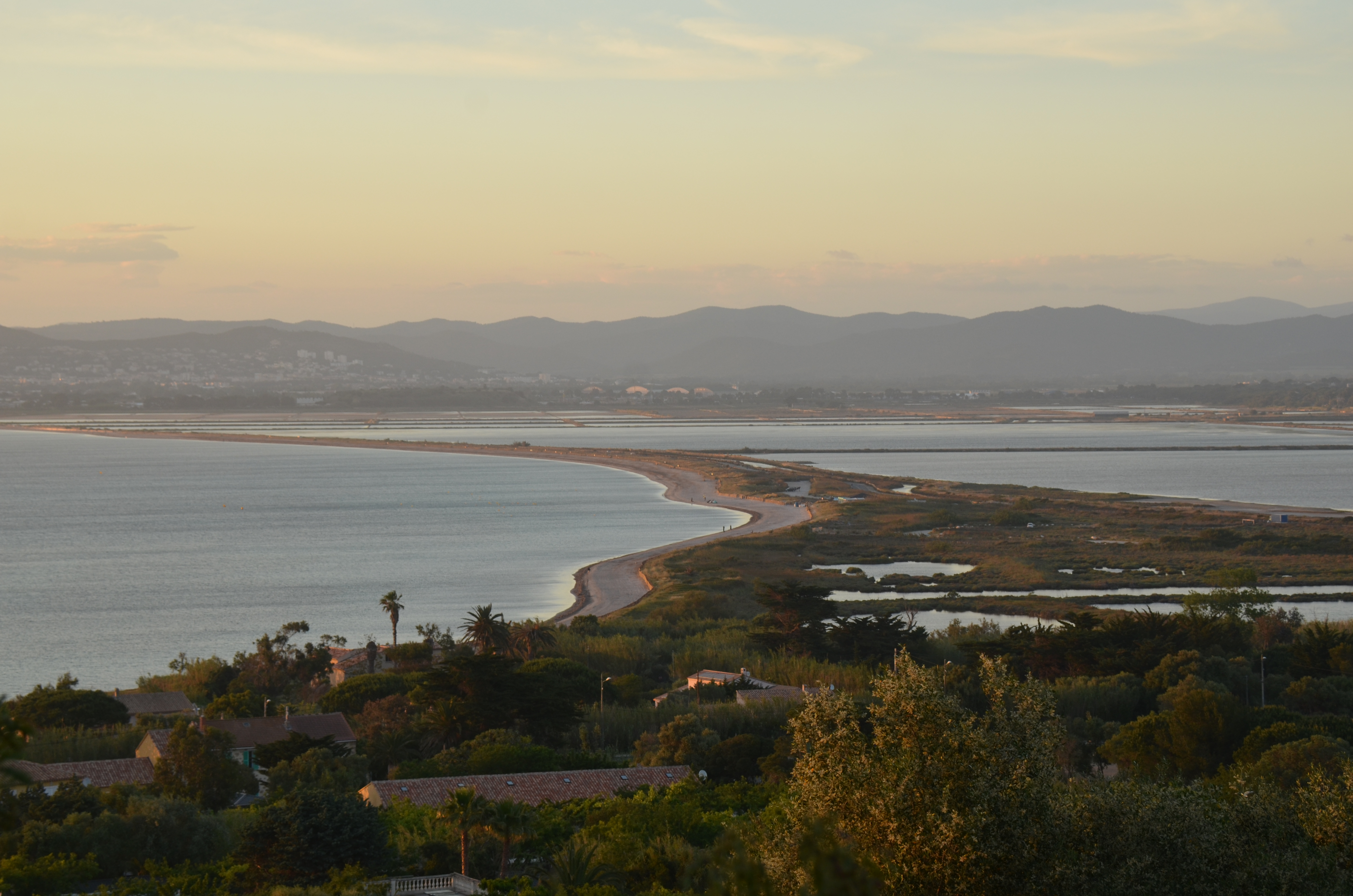
Panorama view of the peninsula (West tombolo, looking northwards)

It is a prime tourist destination, with campgrounds and water sports.

== Geography ==
The peninsula is effectively a narrow, hilly island uniquely connected to the main land by two strips of land. Between these strips, the east and west tombolo, are old salt evaporation ponds. These are not used anymore for salt production, and instead provide a unique marshland known for its population of flamingo.

A small village called La Capte is situated on the east tombolo, mainly consisting of hotels, restaurants, and holiday homes.

The north side of the island, as well as the west tombolo, is characterized by wide, shallow sandy beaches, while the south side has steep cliffs with many bays and small ports. A hiking trail is maintained along the south side of the island to allow access to the various bays.

Just southeast of the peninsula is the Île de Porquerolles, and east of that Île de Port-Cros and Île du Levant.

== History ==
On 18 March 1879 the battery-ship Arrogante was driven ashore by a gale, and ran aground on the beach of Badine, causing the death of 50 sailors. A local doctor was particularly commended for his treatment of the victims and is commemorated with a heritage plaque in Hyères.

== Economy ==
Extensive vineyards on the peninsula produce AOC Côtes de Provence wines.

The peninsula has many tourist facilities, such as hotels and campsites, restaurants and bars. It also has opportunities for water activities, such as diving, sailing, and windsurfing.

Due to its ease of access via the tombolo, the peninsula can be quite crowded during the high season.

== Personalities ==
- Saint-John Perse (pseudonym of Alexis Leger), Nobel Prize–winning poet and diplomat died there in 1975.
