= Museum of Ancient Seafaring =

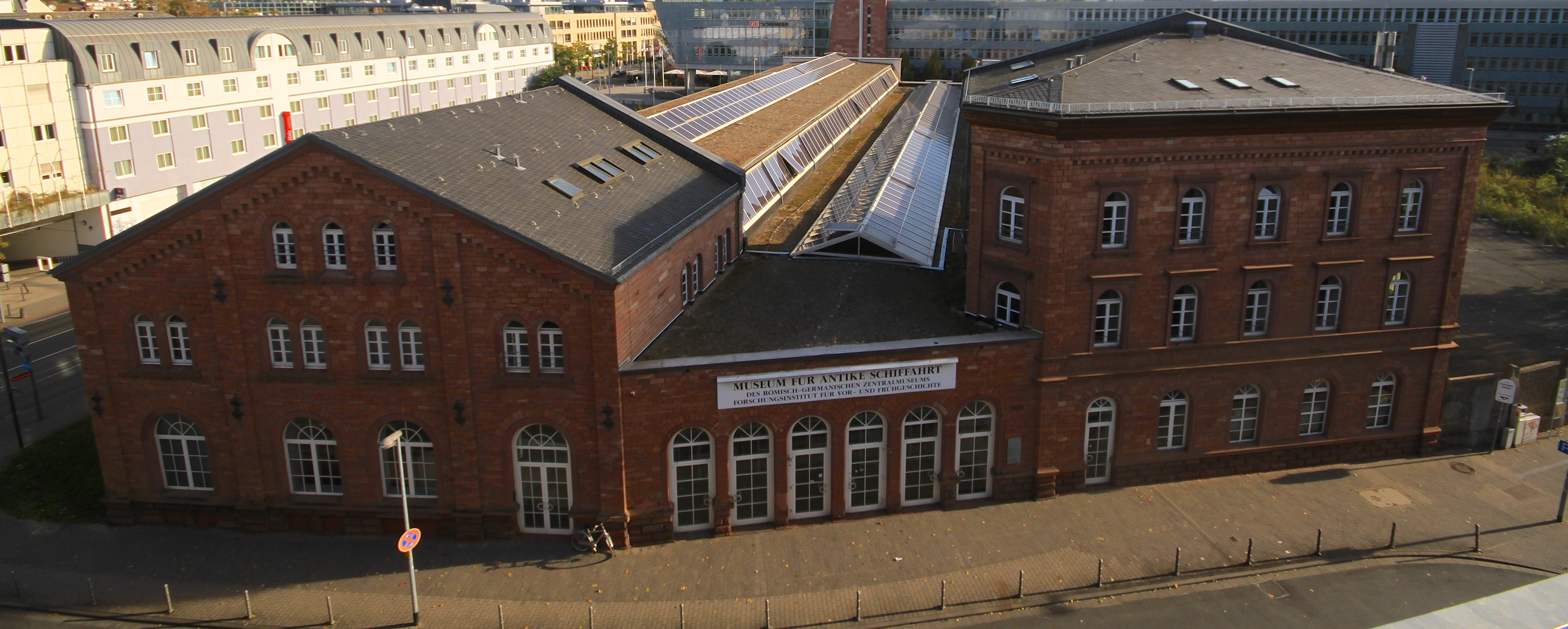
- Museum of Ancient Seafaring
- Established: September 1994
- Location: Mainz, Germany
- Coordinates: 49°59′39″N 8°16′49″E
- Type: Maritime museum
- Owner: Leibniz Association
- Website: Museum für Antike Schiffahrt des RGZM, Mainz

The Museum of Ancient Seafaring (German: Museum für antike Schifffahrt) was installed in Mainz in 1994 in the former central covered market (before railway repair shop of the Hessian Ludwig Railway) near the South Station, nowadays Mainz Römisches Theater station, as a branch of the Romano-Germanic Central Museum (Mainz). The new archaeological center is built right beside the current museum building. A workshop is affiliated to the museum, where visitors have the opportunity to watch the staff replicate ancient ship models.

== History ==
Due to the fact that in 1981/82 during construction works near the Rhine river well-preserved remains of several ships from Late Antiquity, the so said Mainzer Roman ships were discovered, an adequate exhibition space for these was required. There were discovered two different types of warship of late Roman Rhine fleet ″Classis Germanica″ and other ship types.

== Literature ==
- Barbara Pferdehirt, Das Museum für antike Schifffahrt. Ein Forschungsbericht des Römisch-Germanischen Zentralmuseums. Römisch-Germanisches Zentralmuseum, Mainz 1995, ISBN 3-88467-033-6.
- Ronald Bockius, Die spätrömischen Schiffswracks aus Mainz. Schiffsarchäologisch-technikgeschichtliche Untersuchung spätantiker Schiffsfunde vom nördlichen Oberrhein, Verlag des Römisch-Germanischen Zentralmuseums, Mainz 2006, ISBN 3-7954-1965-4.
