= Sanctuary of Isis and Magna Mater in Mainz =

Sanctuary in Germany, dedicated to Isis Panthea and Magna Mater

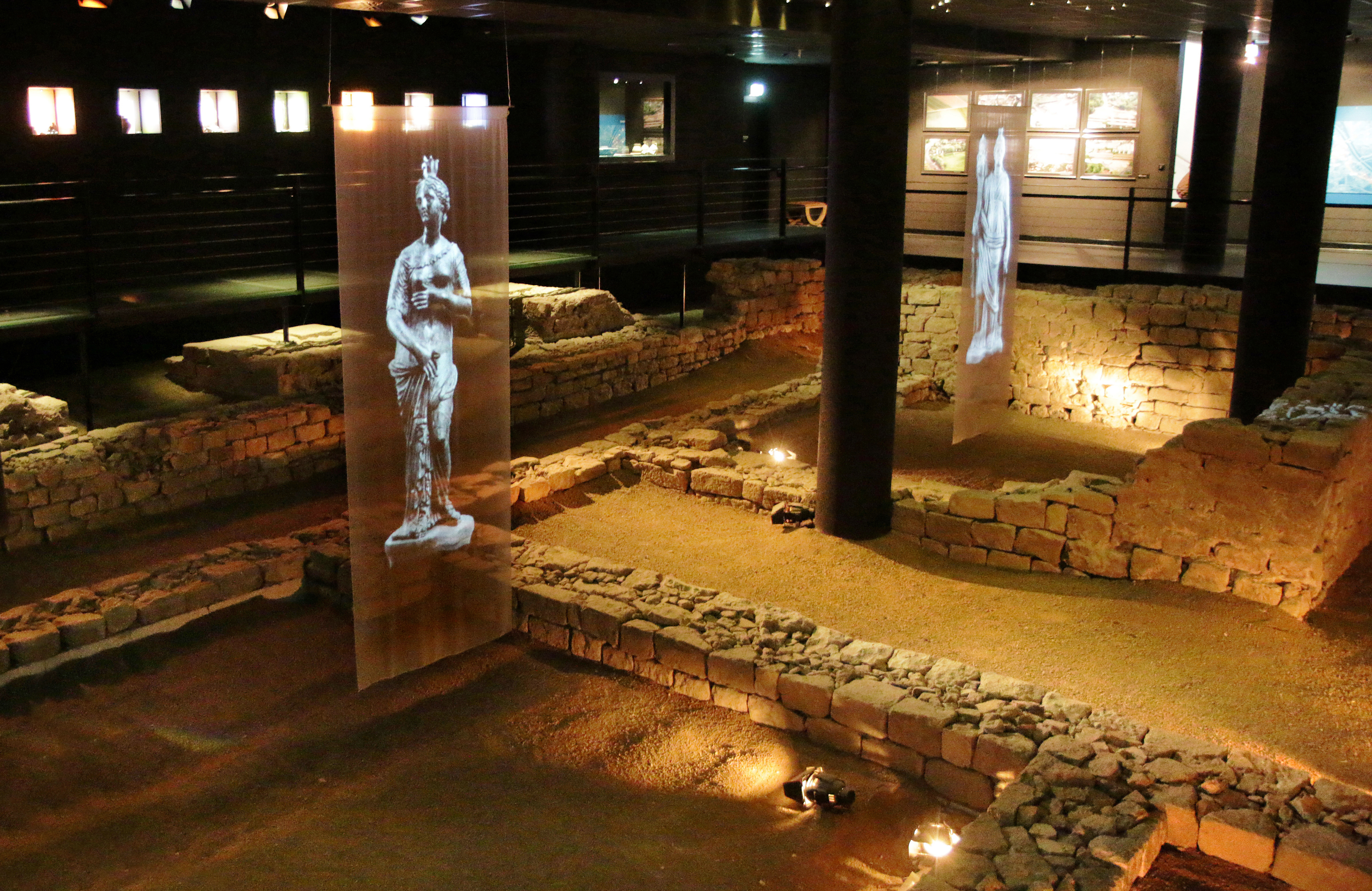
Remains of the sanctuary in the Taberna Archaeologica, Mainz.

The Sanctuary of Isis and Magna Mater in Roman Mogontiacum was built in the 1st century CE and remained in use until late antiquity. Archaeological remains came to light in 1999 during construction work in downtown Mainz for what is now the "Römerpassage", and were subsequently uncovered in a rescue excavation. Plans to demolish the ancient walls after the excavations were completed were abandoned following public protests; instead, a display room was set up at the site, where the most important architectural remains and selected artifacts are presented in a permanent exhibition. A comprehensive monograph detailing the results of the excavation has not yet been published.

== Rediscovery, excavation and rescue ==
In the late 1990s, the postwar buildings of the Lotharpassage in Mainz came into focus for urban redevelopment. For the planned shopping arcade, then still known as "Lothar’s Passage," the existing buildings were demolished and a large excavation pit was opened. The project was accompanied by the Office of Historic Preservation of the State of Rhineland-Palatinate (Mainz Branch). Since the Roman road leading from the legionary fortress to the Rhine bridge passed through this area—sections of it were uncovered during the excavations—a typical provincial Roman row-house development in half-timbered construction with small workshops was to be expected.

However, in late 1999, two unexpected discoveries of considerable significance were made at a depth of about five meters: the remains of a Roman sanctuary, which could be attributed to Isis Panthea and Magna Mater based on inscribed blocks, and, beneath it, a burial site from the Hallstatt period that was about 700 years older. Over the following 17 months, the ancient building complex of the sanctuary and the Iron Age grave were carefully excavated and documented. For archaeobotanical and archaeozoological analyses, 15 tonnes of soil were removed; in addition, 49 m³ of recovered material was collected. The work was completed in early 2001. A monographic publication on the excavation results is still pending.

At first, it had been intended to remove the exposed remains after documentation and continue construction of the shopping mall as planned. A similar fate had already befallen a Mithraeum in Ballplatz square from the 1st or 2nd century in the 1970s: uncovered during construction work, it was only inadequately archaeologically recorded and was ultimately destroyed. This time, however, protest emerged. In Mainz, a public debate flared up, and the newly founded initiative Römisches Mainz e. V. campaigned for the preservation of the sanctuary and collected around 20,000 signatures—an unmistakable vote against its destruction.

Public pressure was not without consequence. The ancient ruins of the sanctuary where permanently secured and integrated into the new mall. The public pressure did not go unnoticed. At the initiative's suggestion, the shopping arcade was named "Römerpassage"—a proposal that initially met with considerable resistance in the municipal committees but ultimately prevailed. To proceed with the planned construction of the shopping mall façade, the remains had to be relocated: in a complex operation, part of the structural remnants was carefully dismantled and moved several metres, while the remainder was destroyed by the construction equipment. The preservation and relocation of the recovered remains cost approximately 3.5 million euros and were financed by the city of Mainz and the state of Rhineland-Palatinate. Since its opening on 30 August 2003, when approximately 25,000 visitors streamed into the city centre, the sanctuary remains have been open to the public in a presentation room in the basement of the Römerpassage as the "Taberna archaeologica."

A glass walkway now runs around the exposed walls, while projections bring Isis and Magna Mater to life among the ancient foundations. Films, audio stations, and interactive elements complement the display cases containing the original finds. A staged ritual scene illustrates the daily practice of the cult; in an audio sequence, a fictional contemporary witness speaks about religious life in Roman Mainz in the 1st century CE. The space is kept deliberately dark to create a mystical atmosphere; small lamps set into the ceiling simulate the night sky of 21 December 69 CE. Information panels, along with a plan of the ancient city and of the sanctuary, complete the compact exhibition. On the occasion of its 20th anniversary, the sanctuary was designated "Museum of the Month October 2023" by the Rhineland-Palatinate Ministry of Culture.

== Dating, dedication, and construction phases ==
Although Tacitus casually reports toward the end of the 1st century that among the Suebi the externally introduced Isis was venerated—while at the same time stating that he did not know the reason for this—this passage was long regarded as a misunderstanding, and the introduction of the Isis cult in Germania Superior was dated at the earliest to the mid-2nd century. Although plausible arguments for the historicity of Tacitus’ statement had already been made before the discovery of the Mainz double sanctuary, it was only the discovery of the sanctuary that provided conclusive evidence for the early arrival of the cult in Upper Germania.

A fragment of a building inscription with an engraved tabula ansata attests to the construction of the sanctuary by the treasury administrator Primigenius, who was subordinate to a procurator of emperor Vespasian (AD 69–79). The unexpectedly large number of roof tiles discovered in the sanctuary that bear military stamps may likewise indicate a state-organized construction project, although the evidence remains inconclusive. In the inscription, the divine addressee is named only as [Mater] deum, by which Cybele is probably meant. Two related tabulae ansatae with nearly identical inscriptions, dedicated by an imperial freedwoman and an imperial slave under the priest Claudius Atticus, mention instead the Magna Mater and Isis Panthea. The two inscriptions can be dated to the late 1st century and are dedicated to the welfare of the emperor, the Senate and the people of Rome, as well as the army. The inclusion of the army is unusual and is likely due to a local context. On the basis of the aforementioned inscriptions, a direct connection between the earliest construction phase of the sanctuary and the imperial household has occasionally been postulated; however, the arguments advanced in support of this are not compelling.

The establishment of a double sanctuary for the Magna Mater and Isis under Vespasian has parallels in Italy. The inscriptions indicate that both dedications were performed by the same priest, suggesting a personal union of the priesthood. Archaeologically, several building phases can be distinguished. In the initial phase, there were small rectangular cult buildings within an enclosing wall, as well as several half-timbered structures with hearths. The latter presumably served as kitchens and assembly rooms for ritual banquets. In these cult dining facilities, the services were likely provided that ensured the economic sustainability of the sanctuary. In the 2nd century, the small cult buildings were replaced by a large, multi-part structure with a stone base, a half-timbered superstructure, and its own well chamber. The interior spaces were only sparsely decorated. The cult activities continued at least until the end of the 3rd century; in Late antiquity, the structure was abandoned. Conclusions regarding the architectural development of the sanctuary can be drawn only to a limited extent, as the excavations did not expose the entire sacred precinct.

== Location and architecture ==
The precise position of the sanctuary of Isis and the Magna Mater within the sacred topography of Mainz cannot be determined with certainty, owing to the lack of other clearly localizable sanctuaries within the urban area. Nevertheless, the location of the sanctuary itself allows for some conclusions regarding the considerations that likely influenced its establishment. The sacred precinct was situated along a heavily frequented main road leading from the legionary camp to the Rhine bridge. It thus occupied an important traffic axis and held a highly visible position within the public space. The sanctuary was located within the civilian settlement, which was enclosed by a defensive wall after the mid-3rd century.

Despite its exposed location, however, central accessibility to major routes was probably not the decisive factor in the choice of site. Instead, there is much to suggest that the complex was deliberately established in close spatial proximity to significantly older burial mounds dating to the Hallstatt period, which were evidently still visible in the 1st century. Particularly revealing in this regard is the fact that the stone revetment of one such mound was not removed but rather incorporated into the new construction. Above the central grave, a masonry enclosure was created, which apparently served to receive burnt sacrificial offerings. It appears that when the sanctuary was built, there was a belief in the magical or sacred power of the site. For more information on this Hallstatt period grave, see below.

Access to the sanctuary was provided from the main road via a branching side path. Along this path stood small, simple buildings on both sides, constructed in timber-and-clay technique. Beyond this forecourt area lay the actual cult site, which was enclosed by a temenos wall and stood out clearly from the surrounding structures. Overall, the complex can thus be understood as consisting of two spatially and functionally distinct zones: a forecourt area with simple buildings and the actual walled sacred precinct.

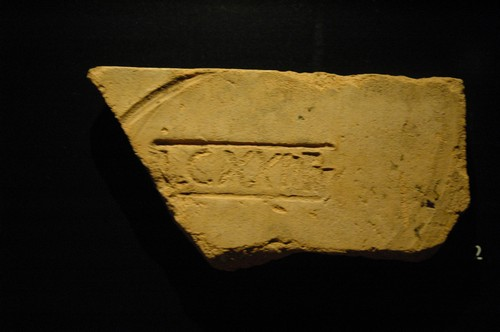
Brick stamp of Legio XXII Primigenia.

The building history of the area proves to be extremely complex and confusing and is characterized by numerous alterations and extensions. The surviving architectural remains are overall comparatively modest and display a simple, at times even substandard, mode of construction, such as is otherwise only rarely attested in ancient Mainz. This is all the more surprising in that epigraphic evidence suggests a connection to the state administration. The numerous tiles bearing military stamps have likewise been interpreted as an indication of possible military involvement in the construction work; however, these apparently derive from secondary use and were employed, for example, to cover a larger burnt-offering complex. Consequently, they do not provide firm evidence for such a connection. It is possible that the architectural appearance preserved to us largely reflects a phase of the complex that was more privately oriented, whereas the original, more official part of the building has not survived.

In the earliest phase of construction, the sanctuary included a small temenos, which was later expanded. Within this walled enclosure stood two square structures measuring approximately 3.5 × 3.5 m and 4 × 4 m, as well as an adjacent shaft for receiving offerings. Given their similar size and shape, it is assumed that these two small buildings were each dedicated to one of the two deities worshipped there; the two tabulae ansatae were likely attached to them as well.

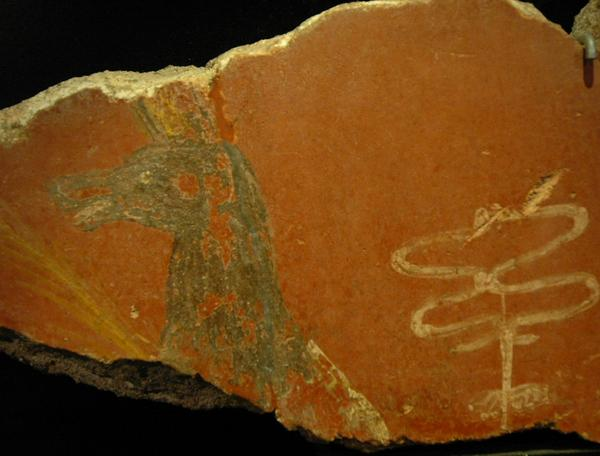
Fragment of a mural depicting Anubis with a palm branch and a caduceus.

Later modifications significantly altered the appearance of the sanctuary. The original ensemble was abandoned, the temenos was redesigned and enlarged, and a larger building—which underwent frequent modifications over time—was attached to the older wall, ultimately taking on a symmetrical form measuring approximately 16 × 11 m. On one side, the structure was preceded by a well chamber, while on the opposite side several large wall blocks were situated. The interior comprised various rooms and functional areas, including two rooms of equal size surrounded by narrow corridors, as well as an access to the well along the central axis, which was later sealed. Very few decorative elements have survived. Remnants of wall plaster featuring simple panel paintings indicate a modest decorative style; figurative representations appear to have been limited to a few motifs. The only better-preserved image depicts Anubis holding a palm branch and a caduceus.

The floors of the sanctuary consisted solely of rammed earth; the roofs were mostly covered with tiles, though in some places they were covered only with wooden shingles. In the final building phase, a small rectangular structure was erected, with two large pedestals placed along its narrow side. This was apparently followed by a gradual decline of the complex; there is no evidence of violent destruction. Among the most recent settlement traces are several rows of postholes belonging to a building feature that has not yet been clearly interpreted and that cuts through all the earlier layers.

== Archaeological finds and dedicatory inscriptions ==
=== Overview ===
Within the temenos area enclosed by a perimeter wall, numerous features such as pits, ditches, fire spots, and accumulations of coal can be identified. These elements can be interpreted as material evidence of social activities and reflect both individual ritual acts and those performed collectively. The interpretation is not always clear-cut: for some individual findings, it remains unclear whether they represent intentional offerings or are part of layers of debris that accumulated during construction work or restructuring of the sanctuary.

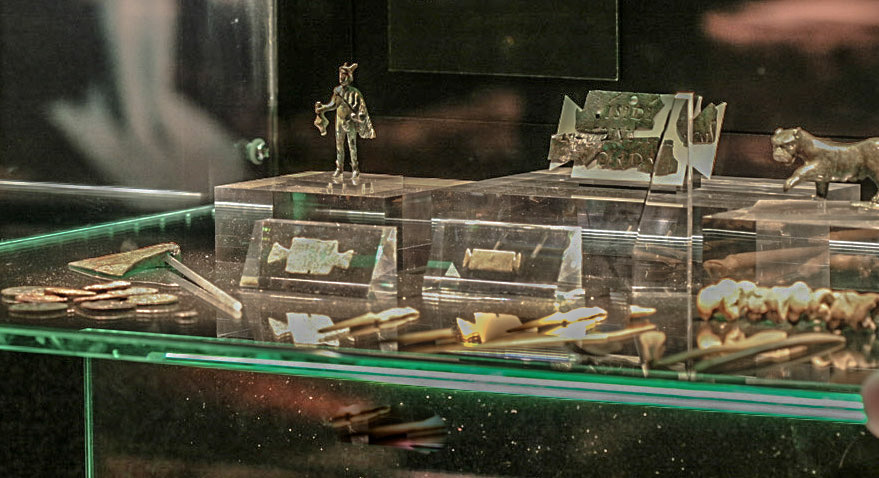
Presentation of the small artifacts found in the sanctuary at the Taberna archaeologica.

Another problem arises from the fact that comparable findings also occur outside the enclosed area in the neighboring wood-and-mud structures, suggesting that similar practices were carried out beyond the cult precinct. Nevertheless, there are clear differences between the two areas, particularly in the range of finds. While cooking vessels dominate the outer area, eating and drinking vessels are less common, and the food remains differ both botanically and faunistically, with animal bones there predominantly found unburned. Together with the existing hearths, this suggests that the buildings in the outer area served primarily for the preparation and consumption of food, indicating use by communal dining groups. At the same time, however, traces of ritual activities can also be identified that go beyond purely secular use.

Some 300 lamps, often deposited in pairs on hearths used for burnt offerings, attest to the ritualized use of the sanctuary; larger oil lamps were probably part of its permanent furnishings. The central element of worship was the burnt-offering ritual, while permanent votive gifts played a secondary role. The composition and sequence of the sacrificial acts appear remarkably consistent across all phases of the sanctuary. The burnt offerings follow an almost standardized pattern: approximately 90% of the animal bones derive from adult roosters, supplemented by songbirds, whereas other species are scarcely represented within the walled area. Complete dog skeletons as well as a detached dog skull were found in the pits and several cattle skulls were also recovered. Botanical remains show no single dominance, but pine nuts and cones, figs, dates, cereals, grapes, nuts, and legumes occur frequently. Oil lamps and coins are regularly found in the burnt debris, mostly without signs of fire. They were apparently deposited only after the burning; the lamps lying in the upper layers likely mark the ritual conclusion. The choice of type seems to have been irrelevant, whereas their integration into the ritual was essential. Variations in the size of the pits suggest differing numbers of participants, ranging from individuals to groups. Based on the material evidence, participants in the cult appear to have come from all social strata. For the beads made of rock crystal, other beads, and a fossilized ammonite found in the leveling layer, it remains unclear whether they are offerings from the Roman period or grave goods from the Hallstatt-period burials.

=== Notable objects of the find assemblage ===
==== Votive inscriptions ====
During the excavations, in addition to several votive stones and their fragments, a number of altars were also discovered. These epigraphic testimonies make it possible, on the one hand, to identify with certainty the deities to whom the sanctuary was dedicated, and on the other hand to draw conclusions about its dating. In contrast to the defixiones, the stone inscriptions have not yet been subjected to a comprehensive scholarly analysis of their texts and find contexts. Majuscule transcriptions of the building and dedication inscriptions, along with translations by Gerd Rupprecht and Géza Alföldy, can, however, be found in the exhibition catalogue Isis und Mater Magna; moreover, they have been included in the Année Épigraphique.

The fragment of a building inscription, in the form of a block bearing a carved tabula ansata, attributes the construction to a treasury official named Primigenius, who was subordinate to a procurator of Emperor Vespasian (69–79 AD). The inscribed block was probably set at the top of a wall. The text of the building inscription reads:

Text	Translation
[--- Primi]genius ---	(first name) Primigenius (erased)
[--- Imp(eratoris) Ve]spasiani Aug(usti)	… the emperor Vespasianus Augustus
[--- dispens]atoris a[r]carius	… Procurators Arcarius
[--- Matri] deum ex im[p]erio	… has on bidding for the great Mother Goddess
[eius ---] posuit	... has erected the construction with inscription.

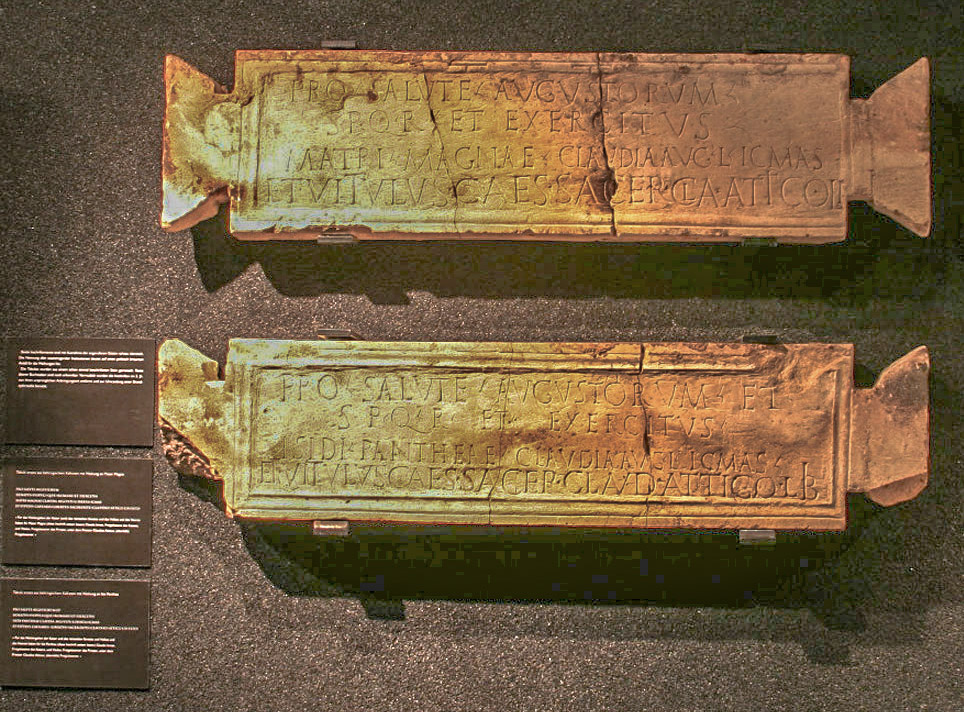
Tabulae ansatae der Claudia Icmas und des Vitulus.

The two dedication inscriptions, in the form of tabulae ansatae, are made of Lorraine limestone. The inscribed fields are recessed and display ligatures and, at times, hederae as word separators. During production, the stonecutter divided an older inscribed slab into two parts. The votive tablets were found within the sanctuary and were evidently removed from their original setting in the 2nd century and reused for the lining of a burnt-offering installation. Both tablets are each broken into three fragments and exhibit almost identical dimensions: approximately 30 cm in height, 115 cm in width, and 9 cm in depth; the letters measure between 2.5 and 4 cm. The first dedication inscription to Isis reads:

Text	Translation
Pro salute Augustorum et /	For the welfare of the emperor (and)
s(enatus) p(opuli)q(ue) R(omani) et exercitus /	of the Roman senate and the people and army
Isidi Pantheae Claudia Aug(usti) l(iberta) Icmas /	Claudia Icmas, freewoman of the emperor
et Vitulus Caes(aris) sacer(dote) Claud(io) Attico lib(erto)	and Vitulus, slave of the prince, under the priest Claudia Atticus, also a freewoman, have had this inscription set down for Isis Panthea

Isis Panthea is attested only once more, namely in Antequera in Baetica; the dedicant of this dedication is unknown.

The second inscription, almost identical, is dedicated to the Magna Mater:

Text	Translation
Pro salute Augustorum /	For the welfare of the emperor (and)
s(enatus) p(opuli)q(ue) R(omani) et exercitus /	of the Roman senate and the people and the army
Matri Magnae Claudia Aug(usti) l(iberta) Icmas /	Claudia Icmas, freewoman of the emperor
et Vitulus Caes(aris) sacer(dote) Cla(udio) Attico li(berto)	and Vitulus, slave of the prince, under the priest Claudia Atticus, also a freewoman, have had this inscription set down for Mater Magna

In both tablets, ligatures appear in the fourth line; on the second tablet, individual letters are also intertwined. Although the inscriptions are formulated almost identically, they differ in the final line. Apparently, the stonemason ran out of space when executing the inscription for Magna Mater: he added additional ligatures, but the final B could no longer be accommodated within the intended line. Overall, the execution—despite the high social status of the dedicators—reveals no particular craftsmanship. Not even two identical inscriptions were produced, although this was certainly intended given the dimensions and design of the tablets. The merely moderate quality of execution may be related to the need for the stonemason to take into account traces of an earlier inscription; corresponding remnants are still visible, though no longer legible.

The two dedicatory inscriptions for Isis and Magna Mater evidently concern endowments of smaller cult buildings within the temple precinct. They may be considered founding inscriptions. The dedicators were an imperial freedwoman and an imperial slave named Vitulus—a common name among slaves; the dedications were carried out under the priest Claudius Atticus, also a freedman. The gentilic name of the female dedicant, Claudia, indicates manumission under a Claudian emperor; the Greek cognomen Icmas is attested several times among Claudian–Neronian freedpersons. The mention of the same priest for both dedications suggests that Claudius Atticus served as both an Isis and a Cybele priest, a phenomenon previously attested only in Italy.

The site apparently also attracted people of higher social standing, as evidenced by an Isis altar made of local limestone belonging to the wife of a legionary legate, although it can only be roughly dated.

The precise dating of the inscriptions is difficult. The formula pro salute Augustorum rather suggests the Antonine period (138–192 AD), as the plural of Augusti is used here. On the other hand, the name of the dedicant and the circumstances of the find argue for an early Flavian context, making a connection with the suppression of the Saturninus revolt in 89 CE under Domitian conceivable. The term Augustorum may refer to Domitian and his wife Domitia. Analogies with the Flavian imperial cult temple in Ephesus (89/90 CE) indicate that not individual emperors but the entire Flavian dynasty (Vespasian, Titus, Domitian) was venerated here. The dedicants, coming from the emperor's entourage, may have been present in Mainz during Domitian's Chatti campaigns in 83 CE, which could also explain why the army is explicitly mentioned.

Although the inscriptions of Claudia and Vitulus attest to a connection between the Mainz sanctuary and the imperial cult, the choice of Isis does not necessarily indicate a direct relationship with the Flavian imperial house. While Domitian escaped the conflict with Aulus Vitellius in Rome by disguising himself as an Isis priest, his personal protective deity was not Isis but Minerva. The sanctuary should therefore be understood rather within the broader context of the general relationship of Magna Mater to the Roman state and the imperial household. The goddess already received support under Claudius, but substantial epigraphic evidence is only attested from the Antonine period onward. The dedication of Isis Panthea—and probably also of Magna Mater—to the emperor, the Senate, the people, and the army, as formulated in the inscription, is likely explained by the social status of the dedicants: imperial freedpersons and slaves from the administrative apparatus, who directed their dedications to the well-being of the institutions shaping the central place of Mainz.

Outside of Italy, a connection between Magna Mater and Isis sanctuaries is attested only for Aachen, where a woman appears as the dedicant of a joint sanctuary. Given the limited size of the tablets and the fact that they were inscribed a second time, it is likely that these were dedicatory inscriptions for smaller, modest cult buildings, which may have remained visible into the 2nd century.

Further dedications from the sanctuary are exclusively to Isis and do not mention her together with Magna Mater or any other deities. A small altar names a Linus as the dedicant for INSID(I), a name variant attested sporadically in Gaul and Hispania. A heavily damaged bronze tabula ansata attests another dedication to Isis; of the epithet, only the ending "[...]ae" has survived. Three small statue bases come from the Pausarii; on two, the feet of a Genius statue are preserved, which on one occasion also appears as the object of a dedication, while another inscription names the Genius of the Pausarii of the veterans’ vexillatio as the recipient. The Pausarii mentioned here were most likely not—contrary to Witteyer's view—the cult personnel of the Isis cult who carried the cult images in processions, but rather the rowing masters of the Rhine fleet, integrated into military units. Other privately donated monuments remain without mention of a deity. Anepigraphe finds include an incense altar with traces of soot and a relief fragment of a youthful god with a radiate crown, possibly Sol.

An altar found a short distance from sanctuary by the roadside bears the name Attis; it was likely donated in connection with a release from slavery.

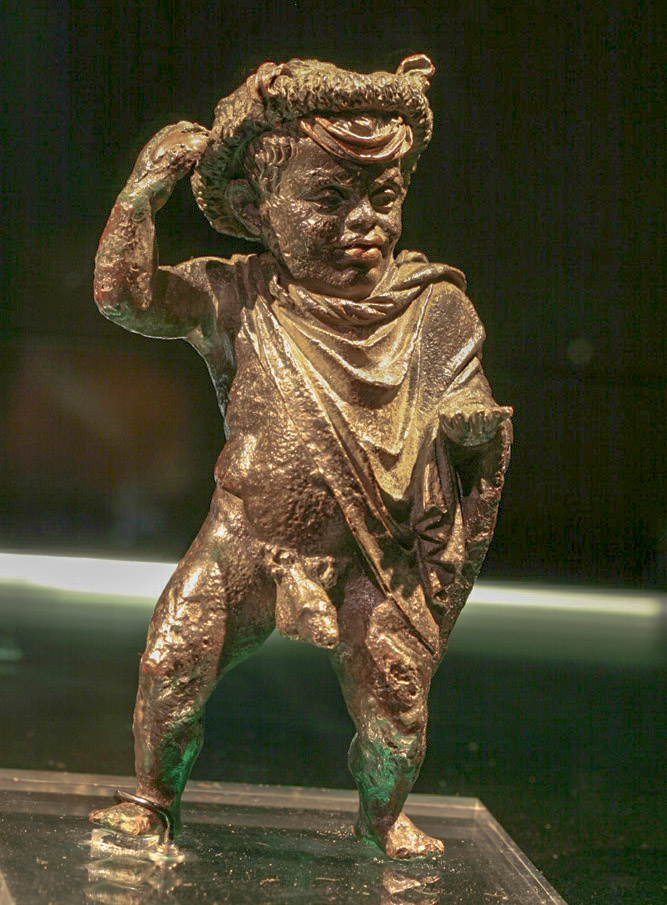
Bronze figurine of a dwarf from the 1st century BC.

==== Dwarf figurine ====
Among the outstanding objects from the Sanctuary is the figure of an ithyphallic, dancing dwarf. It was likely created in the 1st century BCE in Italy and is thus older than the legionary camp and the sanctuary itself. The statuette, crafted with remarkable technical skill, was cast in solid bronze. The toenails and fingernails are inlaid with silver, and the hairband and lips are made of copper. With his right hand, the dwarf figure grasps a wreath of flowers resting on his head, while his left hand originally held a tray or a similar object. This, like the figure's base, has been lost. The figurine is clad in a flowing cloak. The figure leans slightly backward, which is likely intended to suggest drunkenness. It is therefore conceivable that this is a depiction of a drunk participant in a ritual celebration—perhaps the Inventio Osiridis.

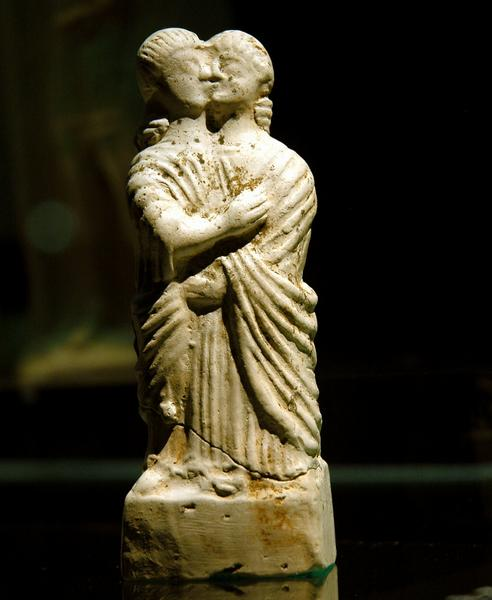
A figurine of a couple in love.

==== Terracottas ====
In one of the deposits within the sacred precinct, a relatively large number of terracottas was recovered, although they remain underrepresented in comparison to other cult sites. The terracottas consist predominantly of animal figurines—including a dog, birds, and a bull adorned with a sacrificial fillet—but other representations are also attested, such as a motif depicting a couple in love.

In addition, there are two unique clay reliefs produced from the same mould, although the base strip of each was individually reworked. One of them features a perforation made prior to firing, intended for suspension. It depicts a man in military attire, wearing a leather cuirass and carrying a raised lance, a sword, and a rectangular shield. The archaic character of the military equipment suggests that this is not merely the representation of an ordinary soldier. Rather, it is likely a historicizing depiction of a cult functionary, possibly a member of the Hastiferi, a collegium epigraphically attested in Mainz in the 3rd century.

==== Evidence of concealed magic ====
Excavations in the cult precinct and its immediate surroundings revealed, alongside the publicly visible cult practice, a second, hidden level of religious communication. While votive inscriptions, offerings, and other sacrificial remains attest to the regular interaction between human and deity—spoken prayer, vows (votum), demonstrative dedication, and social self-positioning—the Mainz lead tablets and magic figurines point to a privately practiced, ritualized form of individual conflict resolution. This practice was beyond public access, yet firmly embedded within the sacred space.

The surviving corpus comprises 34 inscribed lead tablets (defixionum tabellae) and three clay figurines (see below for the latter). The original number was likely higher; fused lumps of lead indicate a ritual melting of the tablets and the associated loss. In an ancillary building, a larger quantity of uninscribed lead tablets and lead lumps was also recovered; it is possible that inscribed tablets and fragments were collected there for re-inscription. At least one of the figurines was largely disintegrated when found; other originally present magic figurines may have been made of perishable material and thus have not survived.

While the figurines were deposited outside the sanctuary, the lead tablets were predominantly found within the temenos, essentially concentrated in two locations. Compared with the other categories of finds from the site, the lead tablets and magic figurines recovered from the sanctuary have been relatively well studied.

===== Curse tablets =====
The Mainz lamellae formally belong to the group of curse tablets. They were produced in the belief in the performative power of the written word, intended to influence the life, actions, or well-being of other persons against their will through supernatural forces. Nevertheless, most of the tablets show a clear thematic affinity with so-called "prayers for justice." Almost without exception, Mater Magna, or her companion Attis, is invoked as the avenger; Isis does not appear on any of the tablets, although she is invoked on curse tablets elsewhere. The address to the goddess is respectful, and incantations in the strict sense are largely absent. The texts combine elements of protective or binding magic with prayer structures—a typical hybrid form at the interface of religion and magic.

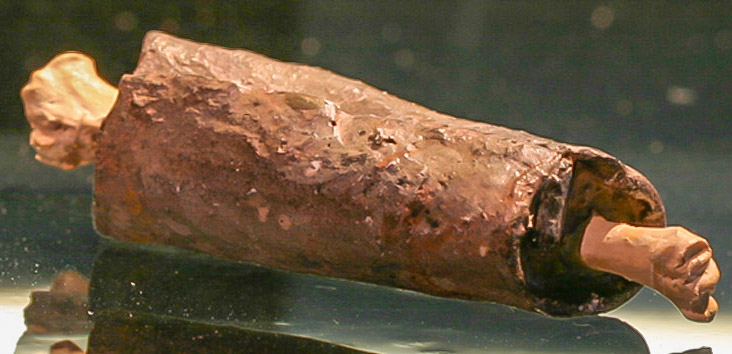
A small escape panel, in its original condition as found, wrapped around a chicken bone.

The content is dominated by offenses such as theft, fraud, embezzlement, or defamation. One victim, for instance, appeals to the Magna Mater for vengeance against a man named Ulattius Severus—probably her legal guardian—who had deprived her of her marital property (DTM 3). The desire for revenge is expressed explicitly; no request for restitution is formulated: everything should turn out "contrary" for him; like salt in water, his actions should dissolve—possibly an allusion to a cultic act performed during the curse. The edges of the tablet were notched after the inscription—a manipulation frequently observed on curse tablets to intensify the effect of the text. Analogies (similia similibus) structure the texts: the melting of lead represents the dissolution of limbs and marrow; the inversion of the writing or the turning of the tablet functions as a sign of performative reversal.

Several tablets (DTM 1, 6) reference the ritual self-castration of the Galli, the ecstatic devotees of the Magna Mater: just as they cut themselves, so too may the accursed injure themselves, lose their physical and mental powers, and become outcasts. Through the analogy of the withering tree brought into the sanctuary, DTM 6 also establishes a connection to the official cult calendar of the Magna Mater cult. On another tablet (DTM 5), Attis appears in a godlike rank, with allusions to the Dioscuri (Castor and Pollux); the cistae penetrales—ritual containers holding the virilia of Attis—are invoked (DTM 5). Formulas such as mando et rogo religione (“I deliver and request in observance of the cult") present the curses as a ritualized procedure of transfer, which reinterprets the act as a religious transgression and places it at the deity's disposal for punishment (DTM 11/12). In some cases, a timeframe is specified—death is to occur within a year or within ten months. In an exceptional instance, a Roman citizen is handed over as a "sacrificial offering" in the megaron of the sanctuary (DTM 4); the mention of heart and liver evokes the examination of the exta and thus the acceptance of the victim by the deity. Besides legal offenses, one case likely reflects a rivalry situation without a clearly defined criminal act (DTM 15), recalling the category of tabellae amatoriae.

Authorship remains largely anonymous. Paleographic differences argue against professional scribes; the individuals concerned apparently composed their texts themselves. Style and expression range from practiced to awkward; occasionally vulgar Latin forms appear, but the language is predominantly elevated.

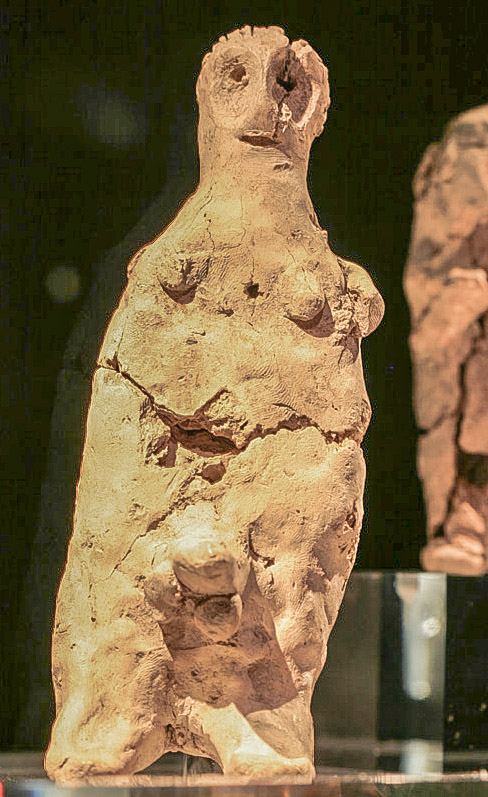
One of the clay "voodoo dolls" found in the sanctuary. In addition to the modeled limbs, there are breast-like protrusions. The body is covered with several puncture marks; it was found broken and twisted.

===== "Voodoo dolls" =====
The second, archaeologically attested means of consigning the fate of other persons to supernatural powers, in addition to the curse tablets, consisted in the production of clay surrogate figurines. In antiquity, such figurines were widely used; they were usually very simply fashioned and made of various materials. Magical manipulations such as pricks or punctures characterize them in their function as "voodoo dolls". In Mainz, two figures out of an original total of at least three show corresponding traces. The "voodoo dolls" were found outside the temple precinct, in a ditch or in a well; the two surviving figures are only a few centimetres high and are marked by a strongly schematic rendering of facial features, limbs, and genitals. The latter identify them in principle as male. However, one of the figures shows protrusions on the sides of the torso that could be interpreted as breasts, so the possibility that this figure is a hermaphrodite must also be considered. The larger and better-preserved of the two figures bears numerous punctures on the body, whereas the smaller figure shows hardly any such traces. The larger figure was also broken in the middle and, with its body halves twisted, deposited together with other objects. Among these was a lead tablet naming the victim: Trutmo Florus, son of Clitmo, a Celtic name. Since no further information is given beyond the name, the reason for the curse can only be conjectured. The punctures and perforations distributed over the body—ten or twelve in total—appear to function as aggressive metaphors, recalling the formulas on lead tablets found in the sanctuary, which invoke punishment, physical and mental suffering, paralysis, illness, or death. The injuries affect, among other parts, the left eye, the neck, the chest, the abdomen, the hips, the back, and the anus. They may be understood as a targeted malediction directed at the respective marked parts of the body, while the twisting of the body halves may perhaps have been intended to symbolize disorientation or incapacity to act. The other two, only lightly fired figures were thrown into a well, which may indicate the intention that they should dissolve in a manner analogous to the lead tablets; in fact, one of the figures had almost completely disintegrated.

===== Deposition and public visibility =====
The exact procedure for depositing "voodoo dolls" and curse tablets is difficult to reconstruct. In the case of defixiones in the narrow sense—harmful spells directed at specific individuals—it is assumed that they were performed in secret, since accusations of magical practices could lead to prosecution and severe punishment. The production and placement of such objects therefore likely took place only within a small circle around the commissioner and, if applicable, a ritual specialist.

The situation is different for the "prayers for justice" deposited in sanctuaries, which Witteyer and Blänsdorf distinguishes from the curse tablets. Here, she considers at least a temporary public display to be conceivable. The fact that numerous tablets were carefully prepared in advance and not inscribed only at the place of deposition, as well as the practice of their deposition over extended periods, points to planned procedures that took place at least with the tolerance of the priesthood. The repeated use of the same ritual location and the leaving behind of remains in the burnt debris likewise suggest a restricted form of publicity: evidently, individuals familiar with the relevant practices were able to observe or participate within a controlled setting. Complete secrecy therefore appears unlikely; a semi-public framework involving the priests is the more plausible scenario.

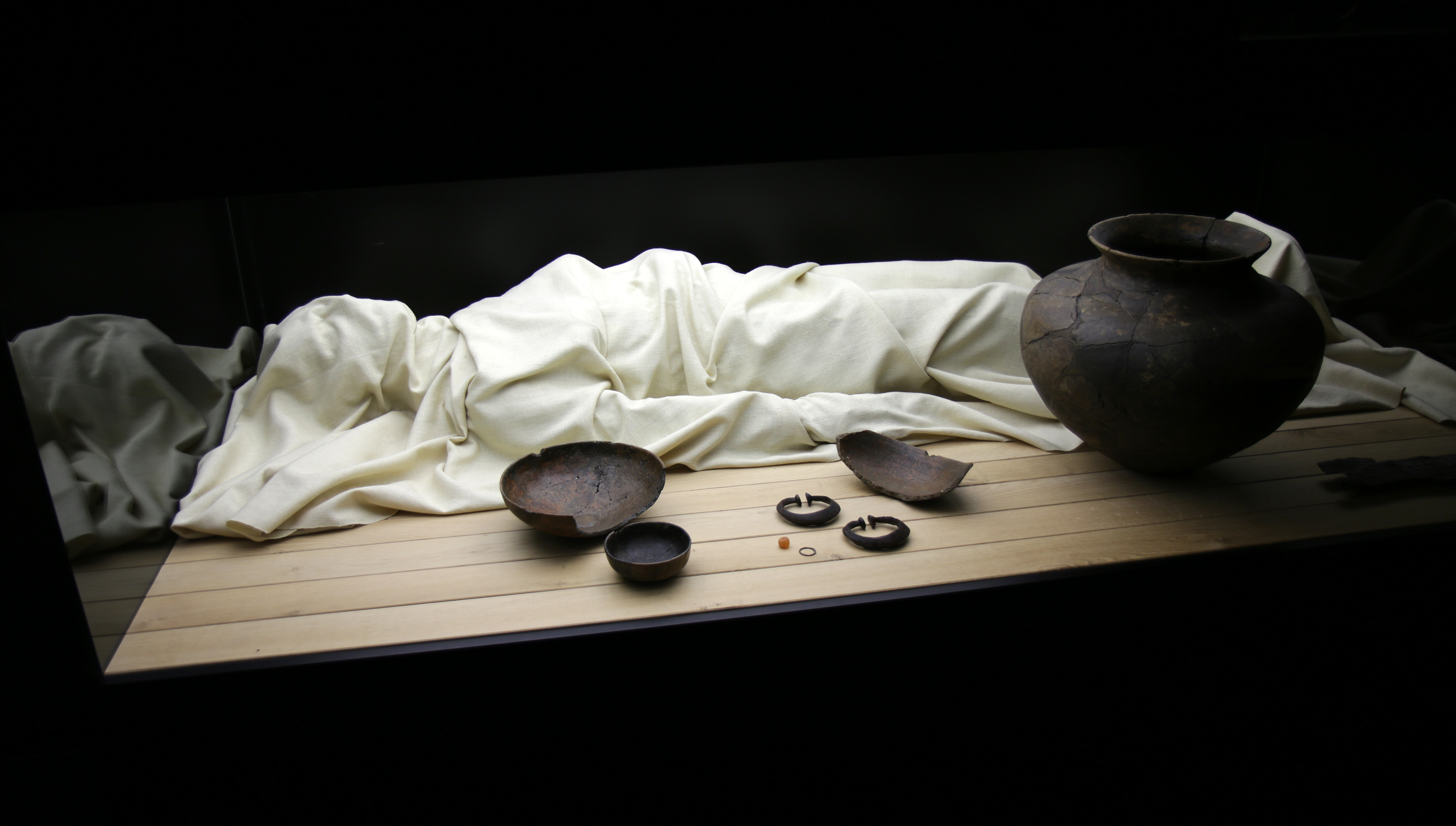
A Hallstatt-period women's grave from the 7th century BC.

==== Hallstatt-period women's grave ====
During the excavations in November 2000, alongside the Roman finds beneath the foundations of the cult area dating to the 1st century CE, a tumulus approximately seven centuries older was uncovered, containing an inhumation grave from the Early Iron Age. The burial mound belongs to a small group of graves located next to a Hallstatt-period ditch system on the Lower Terrace of the Rhine within the present-day city of Mainz. The burial was placed centrally beneath the tumulus and was enclosed by a stone circle measuring about 7.5 m in diameter. Dendrochronological analysis dated the find to the period between 680 and 650 BCE, placing it in the Early Hallstatt period (Ha C).

The deceased, a woman aged 35–45 years of average stature with degenerative changes in the knees, had been laid out in a north-south orientation. Her grave had already been disturbed during Roman times; the skeleton and parts of the grave goods were scattered. On both arms she wore iron hollow rings with rhombic cross-sections and solid stamped ends. A lens-shaped amber bead likely had an apotropaic function. To the right of the body stood a ceramic funerary set with food offerings: a conical-necked vessel with a broad shoulder, containing a finely polished omphalos-shaped bowl, flanked by two calotte-shaped bowls. The forms and assemblage clearly place the grave within the cultural horizon of Rheinhessen and the Palatinate, with parallels in chamber graves of the Upper Rhine region.

Particular significance attaches to the wooden burial installation. In a grave pit measuring 3.0 × 1.7 m and at least 30 cm deep, a frame of hewn planks had been erected. Inside it lay a funerary board measuring 2.1 × 0.9 m, made of three split oak planks. The find has supraregional importance: dendrochronologically datable wood from Hallstatt-period graves is rare, and the Mainz burial adds to the small corpus of absolutely dated graves from the 8th and 7th centuries BCE in the western Hallstatt circle. The later integration of the Iron Age mound into the Roman sanctuary, along with the construction of a masonry sacrificial shaft above the central grave, indicates persistent beliefs in the magical or sacred power of the site during Roman times.

== Bibliography ==
- Blänsdorf, Jürgen, "‘Guter, heiliger Atthis’. Eine Fluchtafel aus dem Mainzer Isis- und Mater-Magna-Heiligtum (Inv.-Nr. 201 B 36)," in Kai Brodersen and Amina Kropp (eds.), Fluchtafeln: neue Funde und neue Deutungen zum antiken Schadenzauber (Frankfurt am Main, 2004), 51–58.
- ⸺, "Die Defixionum Tabellae des Mainzer Isis- und Mater Magna-Heiligtums," in Manfred Hainzmann and Reinhold Wedenig Instrumenta (eds.) Inscripta Latina II: Akten des 2. Internationalen Kolloquiums, Klagenfurt, 5.–8. Mai 2005 (Klagenfurt, 2008), 47–70.
- ⸺, Die Defixionum Tabellae des Mainzer Isis- und Mater Magna-Heiligtums (Mainz, 2012).
- ⸺, Die Fluchtäfelchen des Isis- und Mater Magna-Heiligtums Mainz/Römerpassage (Mainz, 2017).
- Gorecki, Joachim, "‘Mos stipis’ – Die Sitte des Geldopfers. Zu den Münzvotiven aus dem Heiligtum für Isis und Mater Magna in Mainz," in Stefan Krmnicek and Jérémie Chameroy (eds.), Money Matters. Coin Finds and Ancient Coin Use (Bonn, 2019), 209–224.
- Nagel, Svenja, Isis im Römischen Reich. Vol. 2: Adaption(en) des Kultes im Westen (Wiesbaden, 2019), 1192–1197.
- Spickermann, Wolfgang, "Mysteriengemeinde und Öffentlichkeit. Überlegungen zur Integration von Mysterienkulten in die lokalen Panthea in Gallien und Germanien," in Jörg Rüpke (ed.), Gruppenreligionen im römischen Reich. Sozialformen, Grenzziehungen und Leistungen (Tübingen, 2007), 127–160.
- ⸺, "Überlegungen zu zwei Inschriftentafeln für Isis Panthea und Magna Mater aus der Römerpassage in Mainz," in Gabriele Koiner and Ute Lohner-Urban (eds.), ‘Ich bin dann mal weg’. Festschrift für einen Reisenden, Thuri Lorenz zum 85. Geburtstag (Vienna, 2016), 203–209.
- Witteyer, Marion, The Sanctuary of Isis and Mater Magna (Mainz, 2004).
- ⸺, "Verborgene Wünsche. Befunde antiken Schadzaubers aus Mogontiacum-Mainz," in Kai Brodersen and Amina Kropp (eds.), Fluchtafeln – neue Funde und neue Deutungen zum antiken Schadenzauber (Frankfurt am Main, 2004), 41–50.
- ⸺, "Curse Tablets and Voodoo Dolls from Mainz. The Archaeological Evidence for Magical Practices in the Sanctuary of Isis and Mater Magna," MHNH. Revista internacional de investigación sobre magia y astrología antiguas 5 (2005), 105–123.
- ⸺, "Gaben, Opfer, Deponierungen im Kontext des Isis- und Mater Magna-Heiligtums in Mainz," in Marion Witteyer and Alfred Schäfer (eds.), Rituelle Deponierungen in Heiligtümern der hellenistisch-römischen Welt. Int. Tagung Mainz, 28–30 April 2008 (Mainz, 2013), 317–352.
- ⸺, "Rogo te domina. Bitten um göttlichen Beistand im Heiligtum für Isis und Mater Magna in Mainz," in Nina Gallion and Johannes Lipps (eds.), Beten in Mainz: Religion als Herausforderung in der Geschichte der Stadt (Oppenheim, 2023), 101–123.
