= Arch of Dativius Victor =

Monument in Mainz, Germany

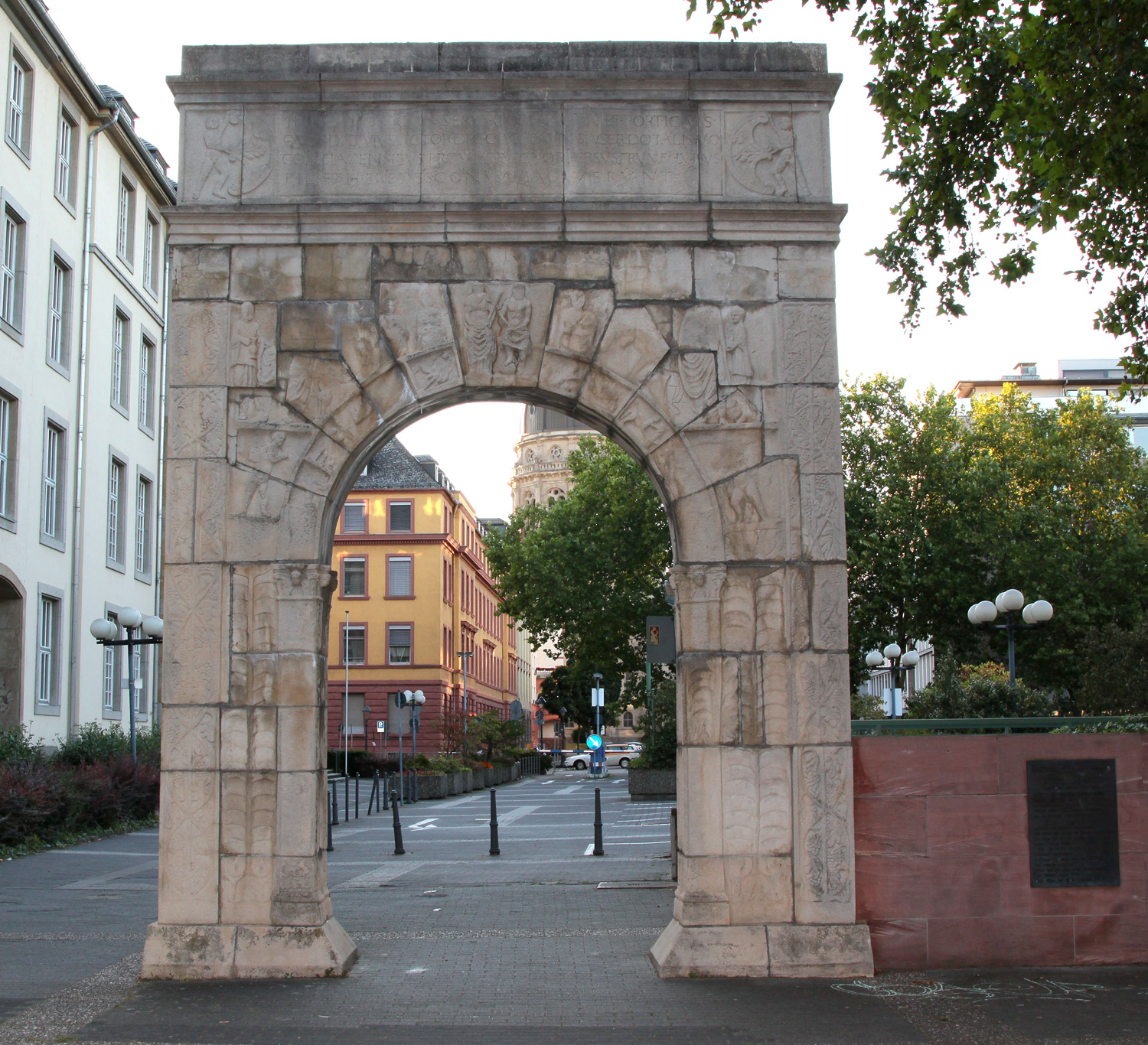
Copy of the Arch Dativius Victor at Ernst-Ludwig-Platz

The Arch of Dativius Victor in Mainz is one of the most important reconstructed Roman monuments in Germany. The structure dates from the middle of the 3rd century and was once the central passageway of a portico (columned hall) of a public building in Mogontiacum.

The founder's inscription, according to which the sons of the deceased decurio (councillor) Dativius Victor had the arch and a portico erected in his honour to the imperial house and the god Jupiter, has been completely preserved. Today, the monument is called the Arch of Dativius Victor after the founder. Along with the Augsburg Victory Altar, it is one of the most important stone monuments from the time of the Limesfall during the imperial crisis of the 3rd century.

The arch was reconstructed between 1978 and 1980/81. It is on display in the stone hall of the Landesmuseum Mainz. A copy made from casts was erected on a scale of 1:1 on Ernst-Ludwig-Platz near the Römisch-Germanisches Zentralmuseum in 1962 on the occasion of Mainz's 2000th anniversary celebrations. However, some parts were freely recreated there.

== History of the discovery ==
Around 1900, parts of the medieval city wall on the Kästrich in Mainz, which rested on the foundations of the late antique Roman city fortifications, were demolished. During this work between 1898 and 1911, several architectural elements of the Arch of Dativius Victor were found between the streets "Am Gautor", "Bastion Martin" and "Martinstraße", which had been built into the city wall as spolia. Workers first noticed decorated blocks in November 1898. Only these were subsequently recovered. Undecorated components were removed. Karl Körber published these finds as parts of three monuments. Further components were found by 1903, so that Heinrich Wallau saw a connection between them for the first time and was able to present a first reconstruction of the arch in 1906. In addition to the decoration, the existing displacement marks and staple holes on the stones served him and later workers as a guide for a precise fit.

== Description ==
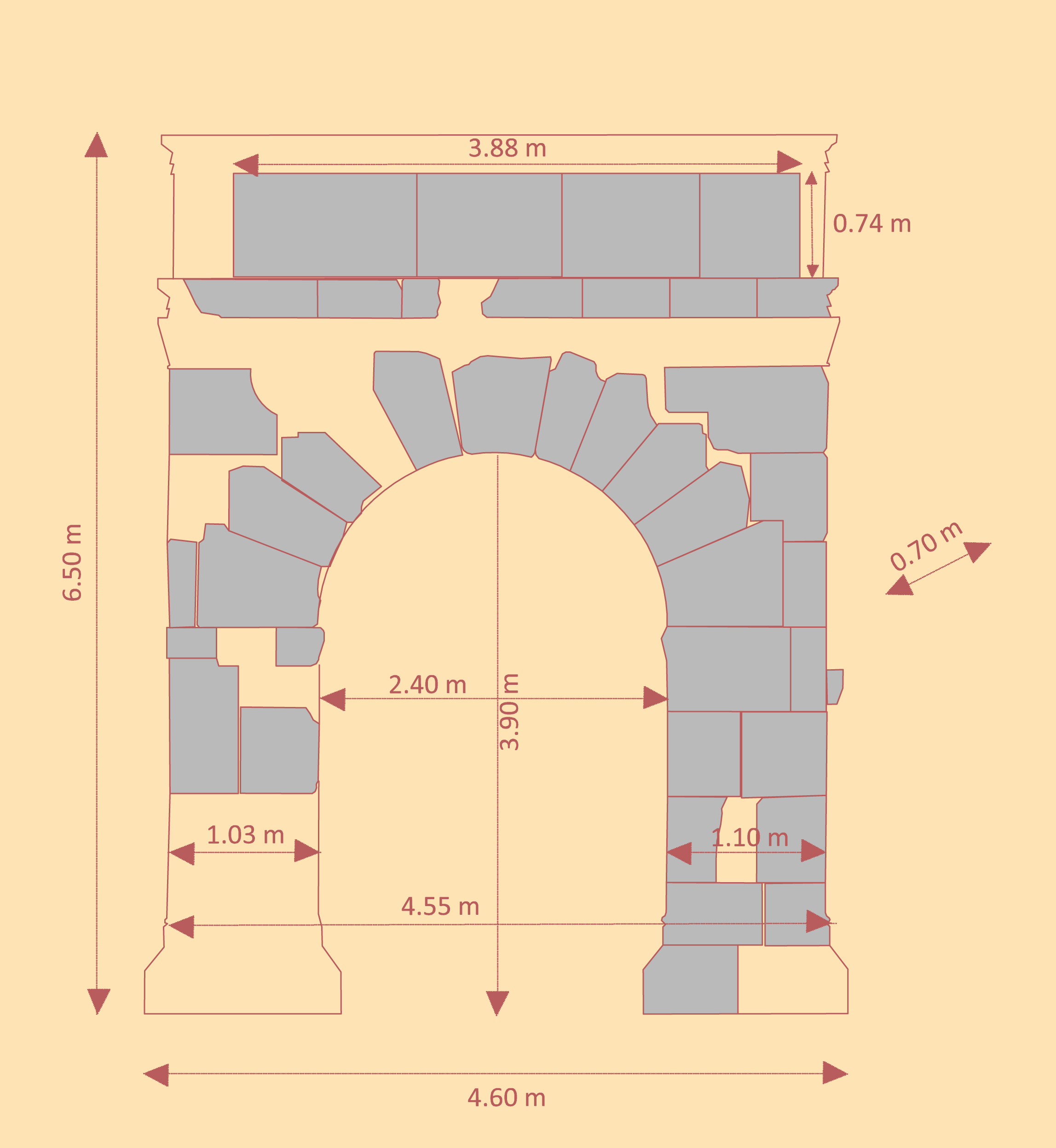
Simplified redrawing (front) with dimensions

The reconstructed monument is 6.50 meters high, 4.55 meters wide and 0.70 meters deep. The inner diameter is 2.40 meters and the height below the top of the barrel is 3.90 meters. The arched pillars have different widths; the left one is 1.03 m wide and the right one 1.10 m. The individual blocks were worked on anathyrosis and executed without mortar.

In terms of its form and function, the structure corresponds to a triumphal arch, but strictly speaking the arch does not belong in this category, as it was not originally free-standing, but was part of an architectural compound with another building, namely a portico. Nevertheless, in antiquity it would have been perceived as such, especially as the inscription also refers to the monument as an arcus. This term became common in the Roman imperial period for triumphal arches or arches of honor.

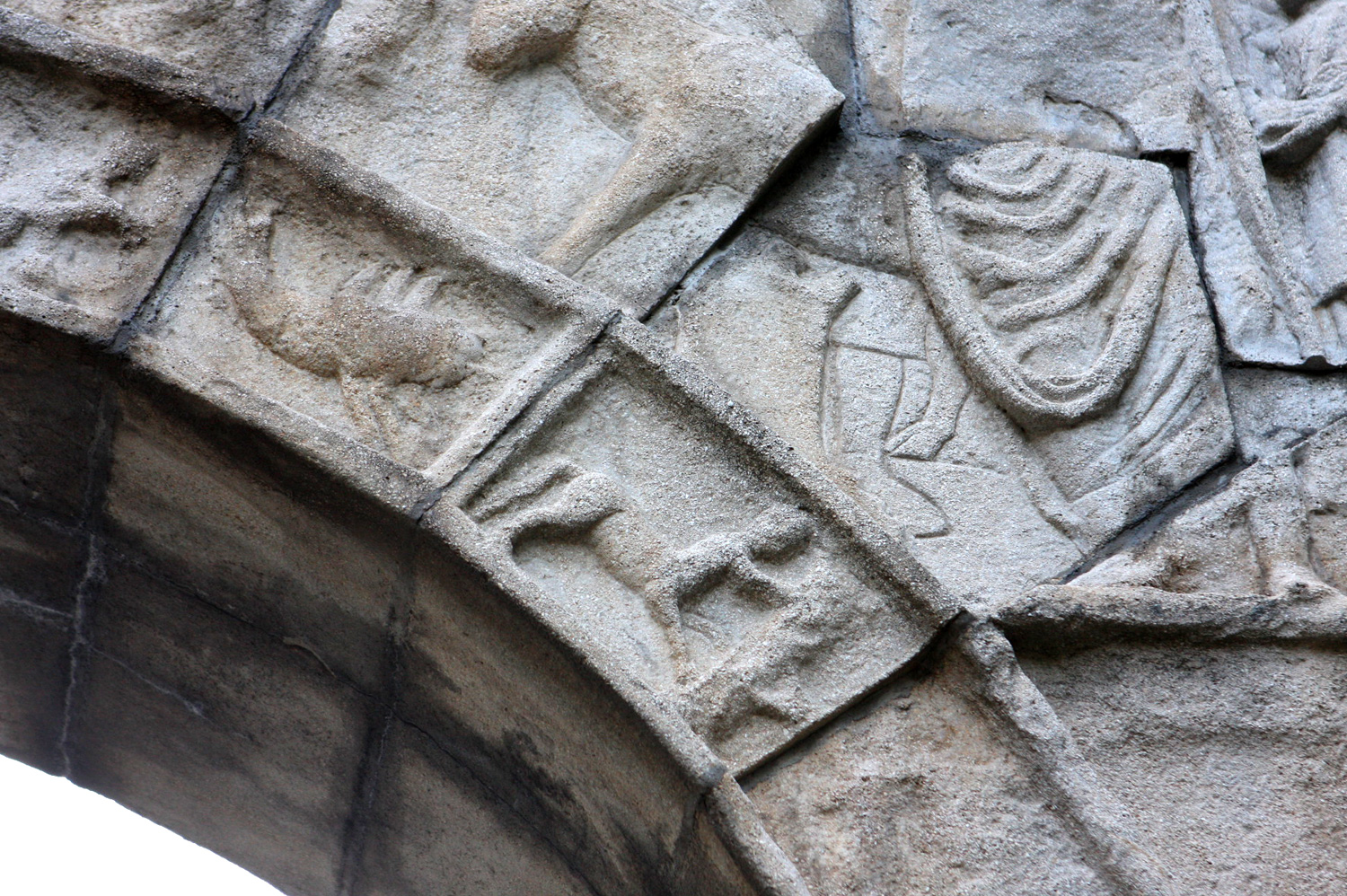
Astrological signs: Scorpio, Sagittarius

The entire arch originally consisted of around 75 individual elements. The 43 blocks found so far are made of sandstone and are mainly from the front of the arch. The back is only partially preserved and was probably not or only sparsely decorated. This is where the Dativius Victor Arch differs from other arches of honor. The reason for the unadorned design of the back is that the portico was once connected to it.

The external sides of the arched pillars are decorated with vine reliefs that extend from the base of the pillars to below the attic. Vine pilasters are attached to the inside of the arched pillars, ending in Corinthian capitals below the archivolt. On the basis of the preserved back of a block from the arched pillar, it was possible to prove that the vine motif also adorned the back of the pillars. The reconstruction shows that, apart from a slight difference in size, both sides were symmetrical and at least partially painted.

The front of the archivolt is decorated with a partially preserved zodiac (astrological sign). The keystone of the arch protrudes a few centimeters from the relief surface and shows Jupiter with his wife Juno. Jupiter holds a sceptre in his right arm and a thunderbolt in his left hand, which rests in his lap. The figure's head has been damaged. The right foot rests on a globe. Juno is enthroned to the right of Jupiter. She is dressed in a chiton and a cloak and holds a torch in her left hand. The supreme pair of gods of the Roman pantheon is surrounded by four other, unidentifiable deities.

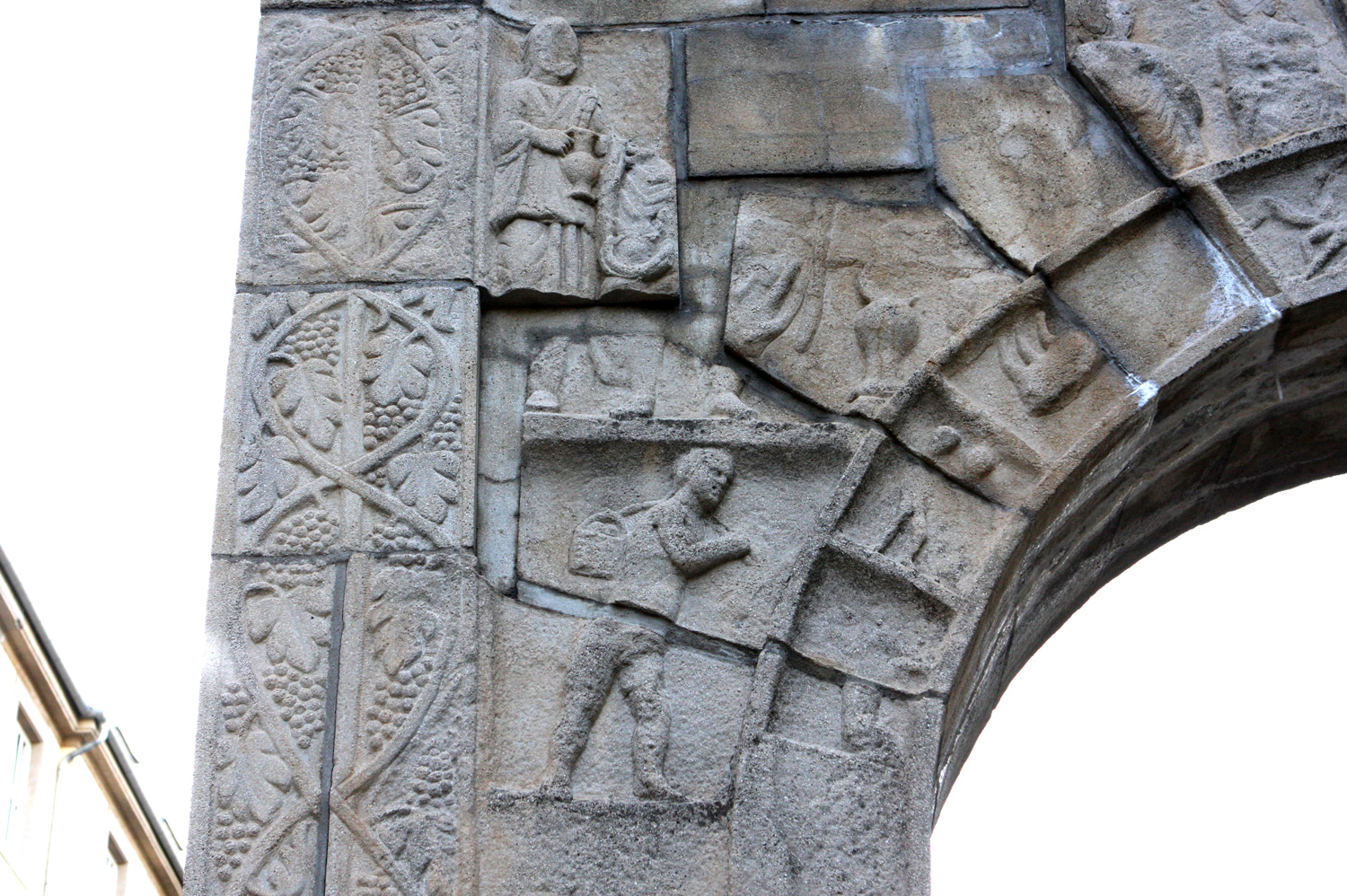
Priest, possibly the founder himself

The area above the archivolt depicts various sacrificial scenes with two flanking seasonal genii. The picture field, which is not further divided, is dominated by a priest clad in a toga. In this figure, Dativius Victor can be seen performing his sacred office. In addition to the office of decurio, he also held a priestly office as part of the imperial cult in Mogontiacum, so that a connection to the person depicted can also be assumed here. The depiction of a local official exercising a priestly office makes the Arch of Dativius Victor unique in the Germanic provinces.

Apart from the individually produced sacrificial scenes, the ancient craftsmen used forms that can also be found on sarcophagi and Mithras reliefs from this period for the design of the other ornaments and figures. Overall, these testify to provincial quality.

Above the arch element is a parapet separated from the arch by a cornice. Architectural elements above the parapet have not yet been found, so we can only speculate about the appearance of this area.

== Inscription ==
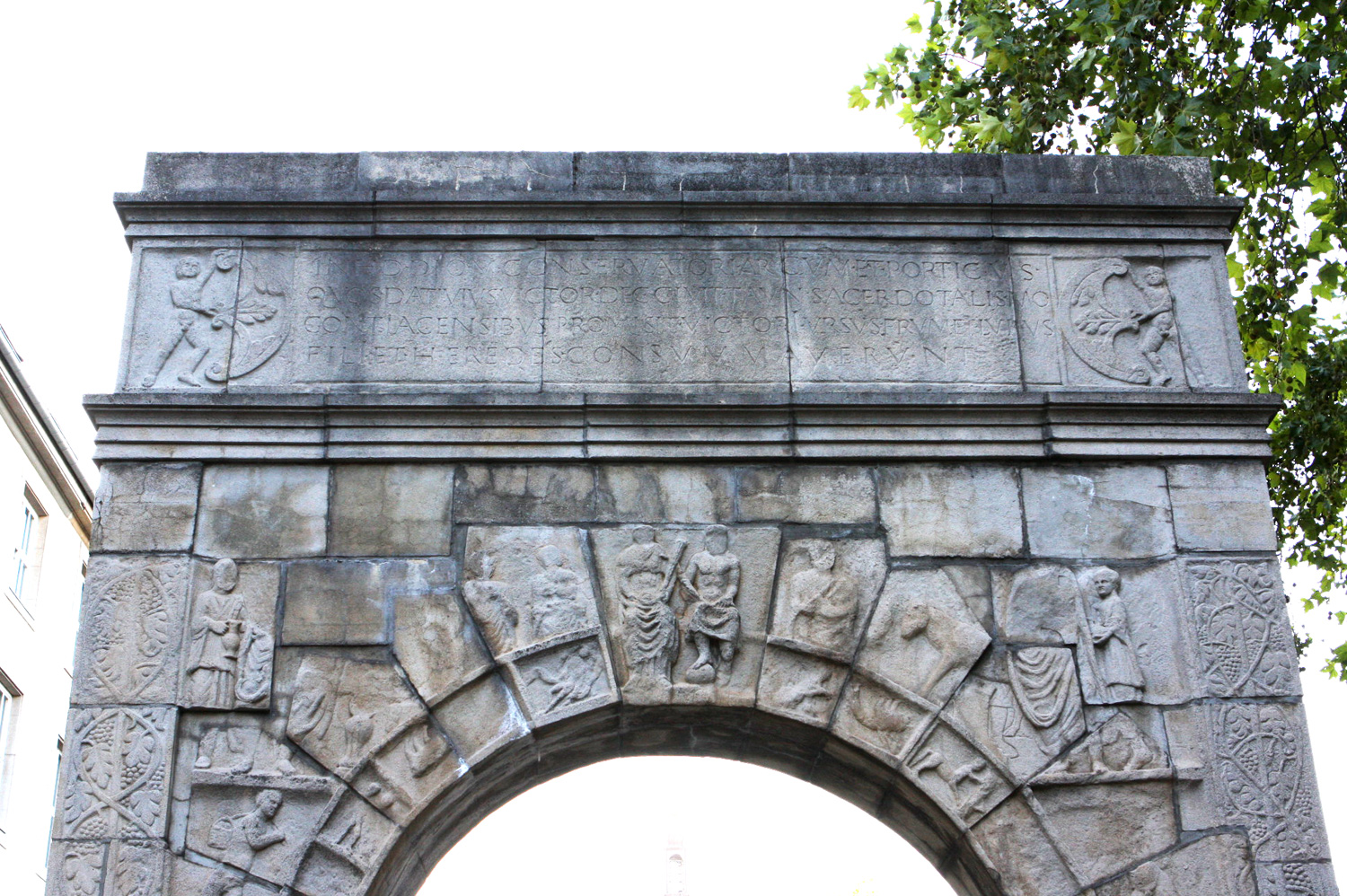
Inscription and figure program

On the front of the attic zone there is a founder's inscription imitating a so-called tabula ansata flanked by two erotes. The erotes bear the pelta-shaped bases of the ansae. The inscription extends across all four blocks of the attic, which is 3.88 m long and 0.74 m high.

Inscription	Translation
In h(onorem) d(omus) d(ivinae) I(ovi) O(ptimo) M(aximo) Conservatori arcum et porticus / quos Dativius Victor dec(urio) civit(atis) Taun(ensium) sacerdotalis Mo/gontiacensibus [p]romisit Victorii Ursus frum(entarius) et Lupus / filii et heredes consummaverunt	"In honor of the divine imperial house, his sons and heirs, Victorius Ursus, frumentarius (entarius) and Victorius Lupus, completed the Arch of Honor and the Hall of Columns to the Iuppiter Optimus Maximus Conservator, which Dativius Victor, decurio (councillor) of the Civitas (local authority) of the Taunensians (Nida) and former provincial priest, had promised to the citizens of Mogontiacum."

Three of the four blocks of the inscription panel were found in 1898, published by Karl Körber and included in the Corpus Inscriptionum Latinarum. The fourth block was only added in 1911 and received a supplement.

== Dating and ancient location ==
Context of the Arch of Honor

As the structure was no longer in situ when it was found, it can only be dated indirectly. From an art-historical perspective, the relief scenes on the front of the arch suggest that the Arch of Dativius Victor was probably built in the second quarter of the 3rd century AD. From an epigraphic point of view, it can also be dated to this period. The formula "IN H D D" for "in H(onorem) D(omus) D(ivinae)", meaning "to the divine imperial house", emerged in the middle of the 2nd century and remained a common designation until late antiquity.

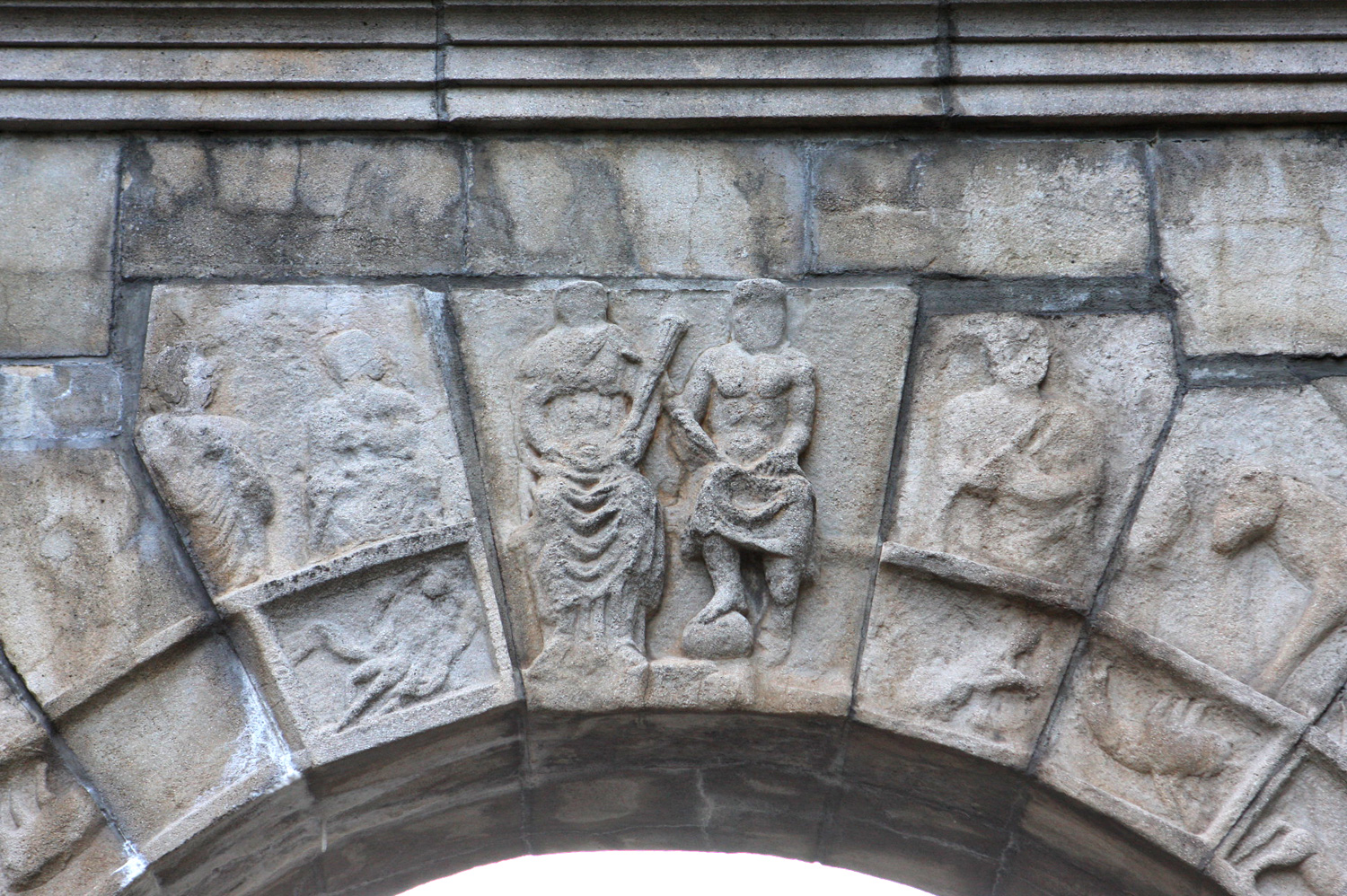
Jupiter and Juno

Another clue is hidden in the formula I.O.M. conservatori. Iuppiter Optimus Maximus was worshipped in the Upper Germanic region together with his wife Juno, above all in the cult of Iupiter Dolichenus. The epithet conservator - "keeper of the realm" - for the father of the gods only appears on three other inscriptions in Mainz. Two of these inscriptions date to the first half of the third century, i.e. to the same time frame as suggested for the Dativius-Victor arch: firstly on a four-gods stone, which was also found near the Gautor around 1900 and can be dated to the year 242 AD by its inscription. Secondly, there is the inscription CIL 13, 6708 from the reign of Severus Alexander in 222 AD The use of the epithet Conservator in the first half of the 3rd century suggests that Jupiter was invoked in the form of the keeper of the empire, especially at a time when the borders of the empire were under acute threat from marauding Alemanni. However, a third inscription found in Alicestraße in Mainz, which also features this agnomen, dates back to the Flavian period. A sanctuary built by Domitian in the year 69 AD in honor of the I.O.M. Conservatori is also known. There are also Domitianic coins with this agnomen. It is therefore not possible to date the inscription to the beginning of the 3rd century using the formula I.O.M. Conservatori, but it tends to point to this period.

All fragments of the arch were recovered from the foundations of the Roman city wall between the Gautor and Martinstraße together with demolition stones from the Mainz legionary camp. The legionary camp was abandoned and demolished in the middle of the 4th century when the 22nd legion stationed here was destroyed in the Balkans. This means that the arch of Dativius Victor was also demolished in the middle of the 4th century at the latest.

The columned hall mentioned in the inscription was probably located near the Mainz legionary camp. It is possible that a foundation of a Roman building found in 1897 on Fichteplatz, not far from the site of the discovery, was the ancient location of the arch and the associated portico.

== Historical context ==
In terms of content, it is striking that the decurio of a foreign community, namely the Civitas Taunensium (Frankfurt-Heddernheim-Nida) on the right bank of the Rhine, had a public building erected for the citizens of Mogontiacum, an unusual occurrence, as a councillor was primarily obliged to his own civitas. This can possibly be explained by the official and his family fleeing from the areas on the right bank of the Rhine that had been evacuated due to the threat posed by the Alemanni. However, other explanations are also possible; for example, the decurio, who also acted as a priest of the imperial cult, could have deliberately chosen the provincial capital of Mogontiacum as the location of the monument for reasons of prestige (see below).

There is evidence of a significant population decline in the threatened territories since the Alamanni raids from 233 AD. After this, numerous vici were either not rebuilt or only rebuilt on a smaller scale. Coin treasures in the Limes region, for example from the forts of Ober-Florstadt and Seligenstadt as well as from Nida-Heddernheim, bear witness to a turbulent time. The fortifications of civitas capitals such as Nida, Dieburg or Ladenburg can be interpreted as an indication of the population's will to assert itself. A now lost inscription of a collegium iuventutis, possibly a local militia, is known from Altenstadt fort, which is interpreted as a measure taken by the inhabitants of the province on their own initiative.

The areas on the right bank of the Rhine were finally abandoned in 259/260 (Limesfall). The family of Dativius Victor may have found shelter in the still safe Mogontiacum and donated a public building out of gratitude. The dedication of the inscription to the preserving Jupiter (Iupiter Conservator) corresponds to this, which indicates a happy outcome to the dangerous situation. The sons of Dativius Victor finally fulfilled the vow made to him by completing the building.

In addition to the Arch of Dativius Victor, there is another stone monument that could provide evidence of such a retreat to Mainz by a councillor of the Civitas Taunensium. The Nidensian duumvir Licinius Tugnatius Publius had a Jupiter column re-erected (in suo ut haberet restituit) on his property in Mainz-Kastel in the same year as the Altenstadt inscription (242 AD). This inscription is also dedicated to Iupiter Conservator. However, there are also known inscriptions by officials of the civitas who initially remained in Heddernheim and date to the same period.

There is, however, no verifiable connection between the foundation of the arch, the adjoining portico and the relocation of Dativius Victor's family. As part of his office as priest of the imperial cult in Mogontiacum, his presence there was required on numerous public holidays. Dativius Victor is also likely to have frequently visited the provincial capital on official business. A donation could therefore also have been made in the course of these duties.

== Bibliography ==
- Heinrich Wallau: Der Ehrenbogen des Dativius Victor. In: Mainzer Zeitschrift. Vol. 1, 1906, pp. 51–53.
- Hubertus von Gall: Bemerkungen zum Bogen des Dativius Victor in Mainz. In: Jahrbuch des Römisch-Germanischen Zentralmuseums Mainz Vol. 15, 1968, pp. 98–119.
- Franz Josef Hassel: Dativius-Victor-Bogen. In: Mainz (= Führer zu vor- und frühgeschichtlichen Denkmälern. Vol. 11, ISSN 0071-9757). Philipp von Zabern, Mainz 1969, pp. 124–126.
- Karl-Viktor Decker, Wolfgang Selzer: Mainz von der Zeit des Augustus bis zum Ende der römischen Herrschaft. In: Hildegard Temporini, Wolfgang Haase (eds.): Aufstieg und Niedergang der römischen Welt. Section 2: Principat. Vol. 5, Half Volume 1. de Gruyter, Berlin et al. 1976, ISBN 3-11-006690-4, pp. 457-559.
- Hans G. Frenz: Der Ehrenbogen des Dativius Victor zu Mainz und seine neue Rekonstruktion. In: Bericht der Römisch-Germanischen Kommission. Vol. 62, 1981, pp. 219-260, ills. 1-4, hatchet. 9-11, pl. 34-44.
- Gerhard Bauchhenß: Denkmäler des Iuppiterkultes aus Mainz und Umgebung (= Corpus Signorum Imperii Romani. Bd. 2: Germania Superior. 3). Habelt, Bonn 1984, ISBN 3-88467-006-9, pp. 6, 76-83, Pl. 125 ff.
- Wolfgang Selzer: Römische Steindenkmäler. Mainz in römischer Zeit. Katalog zur Sammlung in der Steinhalle (= Landesmuseum Mainz. Katalogreihe zu den Abteilungen und Sammlungen. Vol. 1). Philipp von Zabern, Mainz 1988, ISBN 3-8053-0993-7, p. 92.
- Gerd Rupprecht: Mogontiacum, Legionslager und Zivilstadt. In: Heinz Cüppers (ed.): Die Römer in Rheinland-Pfalz. Theiss, Stuttgart 1990, ISBN 3-8062-0308-3 (Lizenzausgabe. Nikol, Hamburg 2005, ISBN 3-933203-60-0), pp. 458-469, especially pp. 465-466.
