= Mithraeum at Ballplatz =

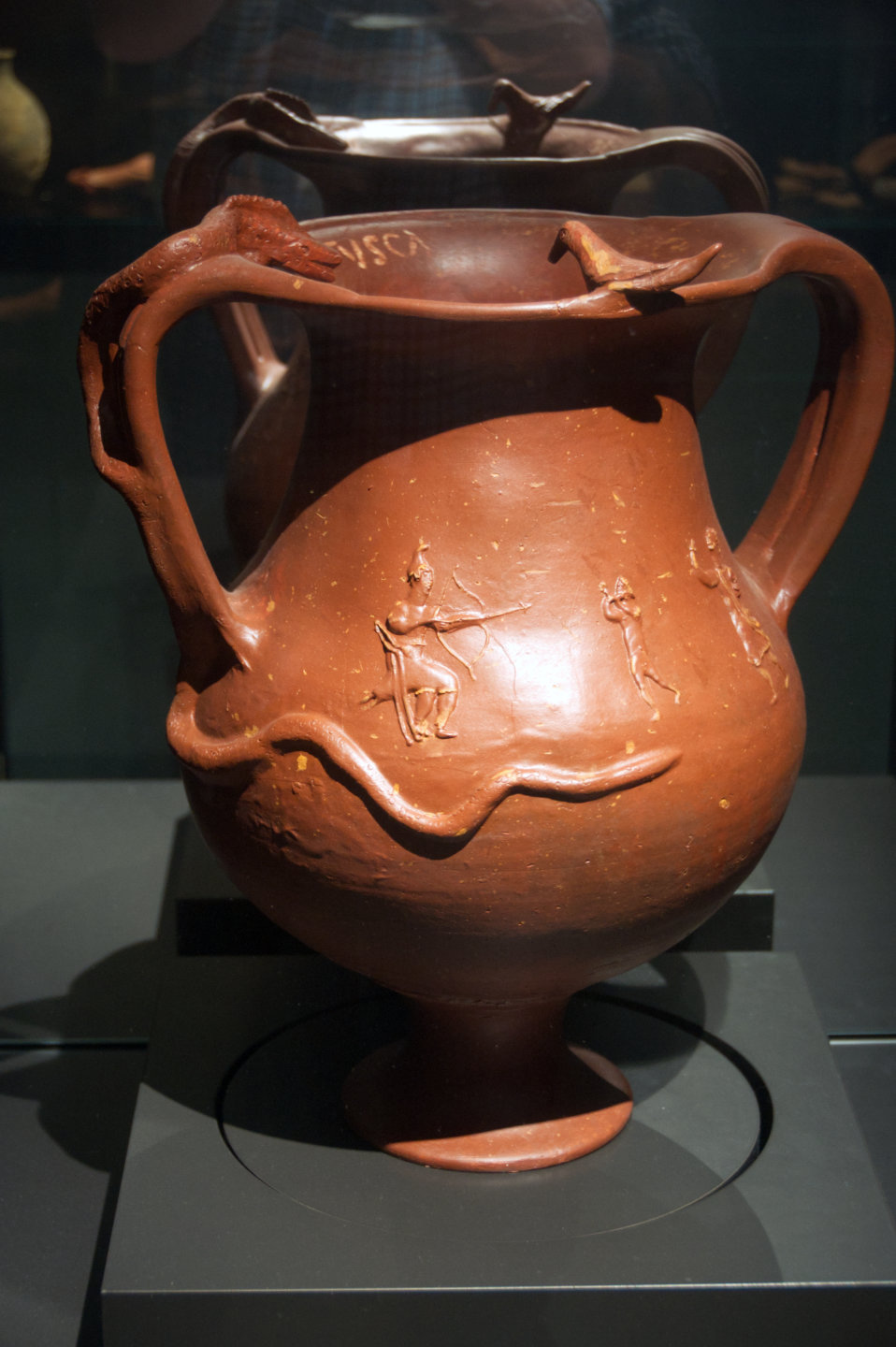
The so-called "Mainz crater"; recovered in 1976 from the Mithraeum at Ballplatz and later restored at the Roman-Germanic Central Museum.

The Mithraeum at Ballplatz was a Roman sanctuary in the area of what is now the inner city of Mainz. It was located in the zone between Ballplatz square and Hintere Präsenzgasse, in the vicinity of today's Weißliliengasse. Its existence is attested by architectural remains, small finds, and several votive monuments, including a large marble altar with a complete dedication to Mithras. The complex was discovered in 1976 during construction work but was destroyed in the course of continued building activities, without any systematic excavation or documentation having taken place. In scholarship, an unusually early foundation of the temple, already at the beginning of the last third of the 1st century, has been repeatedly argued for. The sanctuary is considered an important piece of evidence for the presence of the cult of Mithras in Roman Mogontiacum.

== Discovery and subsequent investigations ==
Since the late 19th century, objects typical of a Mithras sanctuary have been unearthed in Mainz. However, these finds alone provided no clue as to the exact location of the associated temple. In the summer of 1976, during the construction of a new office building for the Nordstern insurance company between Ballplatz square and Hintere Präsenzgasse, in the area of today's Weißliliengasse, extensive Roman building remains and artefacts were finally uncovered. In places, the mortared rubble masonry was preserved up to a height of roughly 90 cm; sections of the wall still showed traces of coloured plaster.

From the perspective of the Historic Preservation Office, neither archaeological supervision of the groundworks was planned nor was it possible to bring construction work to a halt. This was mainly due to the considerable shortage of staff at the authority, which, given the large number of simultaneous building projects in Mainz and Rhine Hesse, was unable to oversee all groundwork or to document and recover the findings through proper large-scale excavation. Compounding this was the fact that, in the absence of a legal framework, the authority had no effective legal means at its disposal, as the Rhineland-Palatinate Monument Protection Act had not yet come into force in 1976.

To make matters worse, numerous private individuals—so-called "history enthusiasts"—soon gathered at the construction site to search specifically for artifacts from the Roman era. Since the excavation work by the Cologne-based construction company was temporarily suspended, these unauthorized excavations were able to proceed largely undisturbed for several weeks, yielding a considerable wealth of finds. The activities of these individuals ranged from amateurish handling of the finds to outright criminal looting. Many of the finds recovered from the excavation pit were later resold, thereby permanently removing them from scientific research. In retrospect, the excavation must be regarded as a serious archaeological failure and a significant, irreversible loss from both a scientific and a heritage preservation perspective. The fact that the sanctuary did not, however, fall entirely into oblivion is due solely to a fortunate turn of events.

Initially, the recovery of finds in the construction pit proceeded tacitly among those involved; however, a turning point came on 4 August 1976, when a large marble altar with a complete dedication to Mithras was uncovered. After news of this extraordinary find became public, the authorities were notified; the altar, as well as other artifacts excavated by private individuals, attracted public attention for a time and were published in an initial report. In addition, a significant find, a crater with figurative decoration and a painted inscription, was transferred to the collection of the Roman-Germanic Central Museum, where the cult vessel was restored in 1980/81. A considerable portion of the objects recovered at that time, however, was returned to the finders and can no longer be traced in its original form today.

The official documentation carried out at that point was limited to a cursory survey of the wall remains and photographic recording of the still extant Roman masonry. A complete excavation did not take place, as significant parts of the context had already been destroyed. Accordingly, the interpretation of the complex as a Mithraeum was initially uncertain.

It was only the strong response that a renewed investigation of the "Mainz crater" by the archaeologist Ingeborg Huld-Zetsche received at an international conference in Belgium in November 2001, that led to the decision to undertake a comprehensive overall study of the temple context. For this project, Huld-Zetsche brought particular scholarly qualifications. As long-standing curator of the Roman department of the Archaeological Museum at Frankfurt, she had already dealt extensively with the material evidence of the Mithras cult, particularly in the course of evaluating the assemblages from the four Mithraea of Roman Nida in the present-day Frankfurt district of Heddernheim. In addition, she specialised in Roman pottery. After retiring from active museum service, Huld-Zetsche, supported by the Mainz archaeologist Marion Witteyer, head of the branch Office of the Directorate of State Archaeology of the Department of Cultural Heritage (GDKE), Rhineland-Palatinate, began the scholarly examination and analysis of the surviving finds. In this process, material from a total of 13 private collections was systematically recorded and incorporated into the study.

Careful observation of the stratigraphic context by the private excavators yielded important insights into the temple's construction and phases of use. Taken together, these retrospective reconstructions provided, for the first time, a plausible picture of the temple's appearance and its immediate surroundings. Alongside the Temple of Magna Mater and Isis—discovered in 1999, where the mistakes of 1976 were not repeated—the Mithras sanctuary is the only temple in Mainz whose location is known, although it must be assumed that the city had a significantly larger number of Roman religious buildings.

== Architectural reconstruction ==
Ingeborg Huld-Zetsche bases her reconstruction of the sanctuary on the one hand on the official survey measurements of the Historic Preservation Office, and on the other on interviews with private excavators who had been present in the construction pit in 1976. Despite the fragmentary state of the documentation, three of the four characteristic features of a Mithraeum can be regarded as secure for the Mainz structure. First, the clear functional division of the complex into an approximately 22 m long and thus exceptionally large cult room (cella) and a possibly also subdivided antechamber is clearly attested. In addition, wall lines could be identified on both sides of the roughly 3 m wide axial corridor, interpreted as the inner boundaries of the benches. The rear wall of the cult room itself lay outside the excavated area and therefore cannot be examined more closely, so that no conclusions can be drawn regarding the specific form of the tauroctony setting; however, an altar base was found in close proximity to this area. Finally, a set of steps uncovered at the south-eastern end of the structure marks the architectural transition between antechamber and main cult room.

The remains of wall plaster are sparse, so that no reconstruction of wall or ceiling paintings is possible: stars on a blue background could not be identified; instead, the surviving fragments show patterns on a white background, as is also common in other Mithraea.

A northern entrance area is hypothesised, based on parallels from Martigny, where a cult shaft and coin finds mark the access point. In addition, an enclosure is assumed at a distance of about 6 m, as is typical for freestanding Mithraea, although there is no evidence for this in Mainz. This presumed enclosure is linked to the interpretation of pits containing Wetterau ware as ritual refuse pits; however, there is no direct evidence that these pits actually belonged to the sanctuary. For the surviving stone structure, Huld-Zetsche postulates an earlier wooden predecessor building.

Based on the accounts of several private excavators, Huld-Zetsche also reconstructs an older, unchannelled riverbed with yellowish-greenish, sandy layers, as well as a range of finds that can be attributed primarily to the 3rd and 4th centuries. Given the topography of Mainz, this stream could only have flowed from south to north toward the Rhine; on the plan of the sanctuary, it would therefore have run through the western part of the building, although its exact orientation remains unclear. Assuming that a small stream did indeed exist at this location during Roman times, Huld-Zetsche argues that, on the one hand, its small size would have allowed it to be built over without major difficulty, but on the other hand, it could explain the unusually massive construction of the first screed floor. Furthermore, according to the archaeologist, a ritual use, such as a water basin, cannot be ruled out. In other locations as well, Mithraeums were often associated with wells or springs.

== Geographical location ==
Mogontiacum was founded under Augustus in the second decade BC as a military outpost on a hill overlooking the Rhine and remained permanently garrisoned by a legion until around the middle of the 4th century. After the establishment of the province of Germania Superior around 85 AD, the site served as the governor's official residence. The legionary camp was surrounded by a civilian settlement, the canabae legionis; its inhabitants lived east of the hilltop fort near the river port and enjoyed a special legal status. The sanctuary was erected as a freestanding structure within this suburb. The building was by no means hidden or secret; the cult of Mithras was not subject to repression during the Imperial period. From 253 CE onward, the area of the civilian settlement was secured by a city wall.

== Archaeological finds ==
=== Overview ===
A large proportion of the objects included by Huld-Zetsche in the catalogue must be regarded as stray finds; that is, their stratigraphic or contextual attribution remains largely unclear, so that a precise assignment to use, destruction, or fill layers of the temple is not possible. Given that the identification of an artefact's context is fundamental for reconstructing site formation processes and chronology, this lack of secure provenance significantly limits interpretive potential. It is also striking that entire categories of objects are completely absent, including bells, window glass, and bones.

Within the transmitted functional groups of the archaeological finds, however, characteristic features emerge that are also known from well-documented Mithras sanctuaries. Particularly noteworthy is the exceptionally high number of lamps, including a considerable number of special forms. Also strongly represented are incense cups, whose use was restricted to funerary rituals and sacred acts. Equally typical are large cult vessels, in the present case made of Wetterau ware, often provided with serpent appliqués. In addition, numerous vessels point to storage, cooking, and serving functions; tableware for eating and drinking in ceramic and glass accounts for a strikingly high proportion. Especially characteristic is the frequency of finely made drinking cups, which often occur as identical or associated sets. Finally, the absence of weapons is notable; only a bone bow stiffener is attested. Nevertheless, according to Huld-Zetsche, one must assume that lanceheads, arrows, and swords were originally present, although they had not survived in the ground owing to unfavorable preservation conditions. A whetstone found in the construction pit corresponds to finds from other Mithraea.

=== Notable objects from the cult inventory ===
==== Snake vessel ====
The Mainz snake vessel is one of the most significant archaeological finds associated with the cult of Mithras; it is considered extremely important for research into the religious history of the Roman Empire. The object is in relatively good condition, which is attributed to the fact that it was still in situ. However, there are differing opinions regarding the specific circumstances of its discovery. While Heinz Günter Horn assumes that the vessel was found near the base of the altar at the western end of the cella, where it stood on the screed and was only shattered during excavation, Ingeborg Huld-Zetsche interprets the find as a deliberate deposition in the area of the central aisle between the podia. In her view, the chalice was left in the cella in a damaged state during a renovation and was covered by the walking surfaces above it. She sees no evidence of damage caused by construction machinery.

The vessel has a rim diameter of 27 cm and a height of 39 cm. Morphologically, it belongs to the so-called "snake chalices"; functionally, it is a crater. The object belongs to the Wetterau ware, a type of fine ceramics produced in kilns in Nied near Frankfurt. Its decorative elements include a snake and a bird; it is likely that additional animal figures were originally present. A painted donor inscription names a Quintus Ca[…] as the dedicant of the vessel to the unconquered god Mithras. Scholars generally date its production to the period between the early 2nd and the middle of the 2nd century.

The figurative decoration of the vessel, executed in the barbotine technique, has received particular attention. The seven figures depicted are divided into two groups separated by the handles and are generally interpreted by scholars as representations of ritual acts, rather than as a narrative of a mythological event. Comparable depictions can be found in Mithraic iconography, such as in frescoes from Santa Maria Capua Vetere and in the Mithraeum beneath Santa Prisca in Rome. There are differing approaches to the interpretation of the individual scenes, which establish connections to the degrees of initiation, to elements of the tauroctony, or to motifs of the Mithras myth. Regardless of these divergences, it is clear that the iconography and inscription unambiguously place the Mainz crater within the context of the cult of Mithras, while further conclusions regarding the patron's position within the cult community remain hypothetical.

==== Altars ====
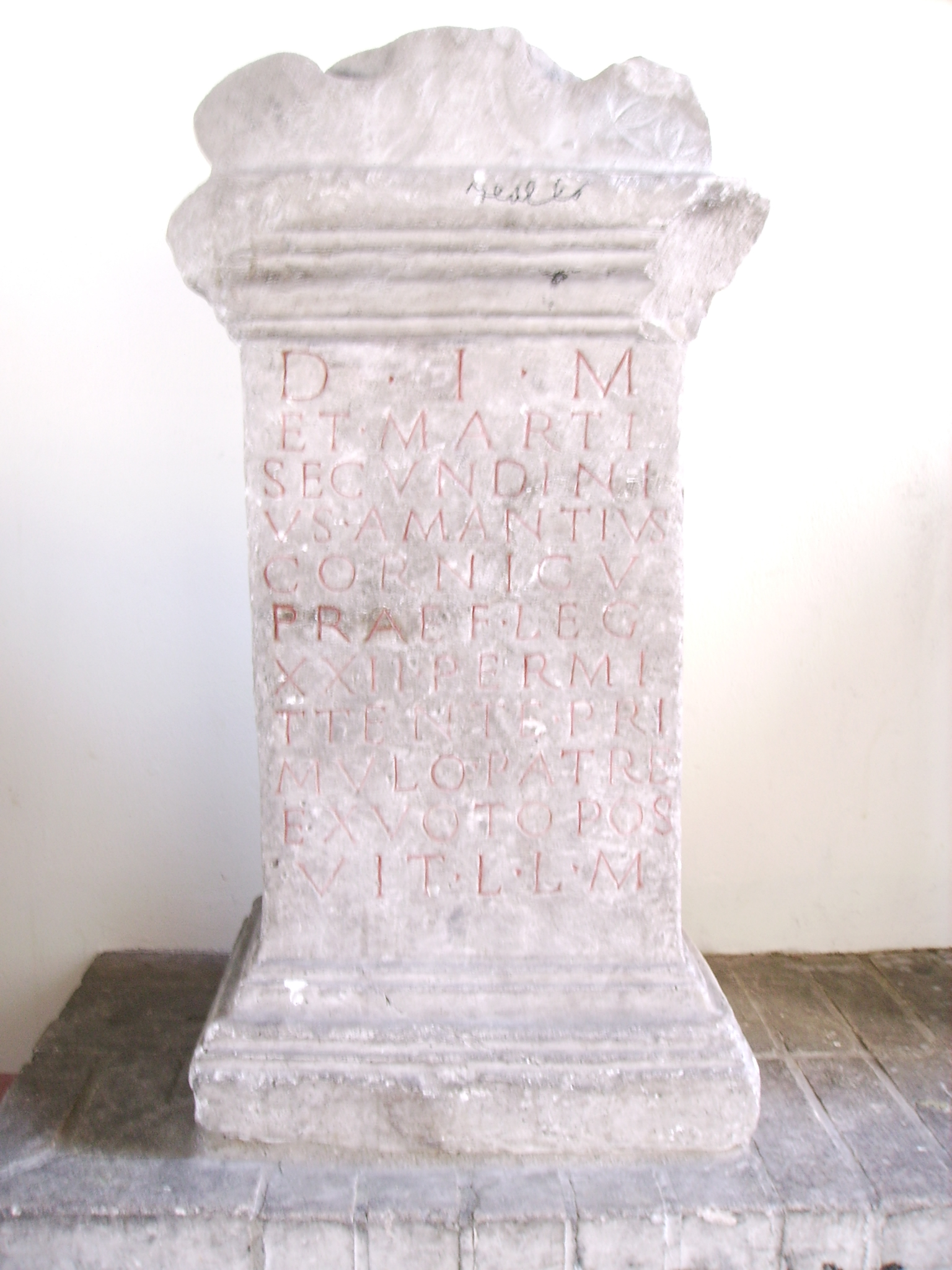
The dedicatory inscription dedicated to Mithras and Mars, dating from the late 2nd to early 3rd century AD.

From the construction pit at Ballplatz square, two altars were recovered: a sandstone fragment preserving a dedication to Mithras, as well as an almost completely preserved marble altar. Both are dated to the period of the Severan emperors. The inscription on the marble altar, which is dedicated to both Mithras and Mars, reads as follows:

D(eo) I(nvicto) M(ithrae) / et Marti / Secundini/us Amantius / cornicu(larius) / praef(ecti) leg(ionis) / XXII permi/ttente Pri/mulo patre / ex voto pos/uit I(ibens) I(aetus) m(erito)
To the Unconquered Sun God Mithras and Mars. Secundinius Amantius, cornicularius to the prefect of the 22nd Legion, with the permission of Primulus the Pater, dedicates this willingly in fulfilment of a vow.

The donor, Secundinius Amantius, bears a name typical of the Gallic-Germanic provinces and, as cornicularius to the praefectus legionis, was responsible for the administrative office of the commander of the 22nd Legion, which placed him among the principales, the lower officer ranks; Primulus, as pater—the highest of the seven ranks in the Mithraic cult—approved the dedication in his capacity as the presumed leader of the community. Although the military is frequently highlighted in research as the bearer and disseminator of the cult, studies show that soldiers accounted for only about eleven percent of the adherents documented primarily through dedicatory inscriptions throughout the Roman Empire, with legionaries being more frequently represented than auxiliary troops, so that the army can only have played a subordinate role in the initial spread of the cult; However, their proportion increased significantly over the course of the 2nd century, and legionaries constituted a not insignificant portion of the community members, with major differences depending on the province and location: In Germania Superior, the donors were predominantly drawn from the Romanized local population, while soldiers accounted for only sixteen percent of the dedicatory inscriptions, with members of the rising ranks of non-commissioned officers and officers, but not high-ranking commanders, standing out in particular.

==== Round limestone sphere ====
The discovery of a carefully worked limestone sphere with a diameter of 6.6 cm and preserved traces of a greenish-blue painted surface corresponds to comparable finds from other Mithraea. In this context, Huld-Zetsche was able to identify stone spheres of varying sizes in ten cases; in the Mithraeum of Dormagen, a total of twelve examples were recovered. She interprets this number as a complete “set of spheres” and relates its significance to the twelve signs of the zodiac or the twelve different positions of the sun.

Drawing on a hypothesis formulated by Roger Beck, she further suggests that the spheres were placed at regular intervals on the podia and in the immediate vicinity of the twelve zodiacal signs, and that they functioned as cultic aids both in structuring the cella and in ritual practice within the temple. Both the assumption of a—only weakly attested—number of twelve, as well as the functional interpretation of the sphere finds, were questioned early on. Regardless of these objections, it can be considered established on the basis of Huld-Zetsche’s study that stone spheres of varying sizes formed part of the equipment repertoire of the Mithras cult.

==== Sculptural depictions ====
A fragment recovered from the construction pit, belonging to a circular, perforated marble relief, forms part of a group of small-format, artistically elaborate tauroctony representations that were produced around the turn of the 3rd century, particularly in the provinces of Dacia and Pannonia. In addition, a small stone relief was found depicting a standing Fortuna in a shell niche, dressed in a tunic and cloak, holding a rudder in her right hand and a cornucopia in her left. The figure is framed by smooth pillars with profiled bases and capitals, and is crowned by corner acroteria of acanthus leaves and a volute-palmette cymation. Two circular drill holes at head height may have served for the attachment of metal rosettes. The original is now considered lost, and was probably sold by the finder. Alongside the veneration of Mars (cf. above), the relief points to the presence of another deity of the Roman pantheon within the sanctuary. Such secondary representations of other gods are characteristic of Mithraea: the cult room was not exclusively dedicated to the worship of Mithras, but could also accommodate the integration of additional divine figures, including Romanised local deities.

=== Further traces of the cult of Mithras in Mainz ===
Artifacts in Mainz that clearly point to the cult of Mithras have long been known. Among the key pieces of evidence is the lower right corner of a stone cult image depicting a scene from the Tauroctony—a scene that has otherwise been lost—which shows a representation of the god of the wind alongside Mithras performing the miracle of the water; similar motifs can be found on the cult image from Heidelberg.

In addition, there is a bronze tabula ansata bearing a dedicatory inscription, three altar fragments, a Mithras cult vessel of the Wetterau ware type with figurative painting, and two openwork marble fragments with a diameter of approximately 34 cm, which stylistically correspond to a miniature from the Temple at Ballplatz mentioned above. The finds suggest the simultaneous existence of several communities and sanctuaries in Mogontiacum, similar to other Roman settlements along the Rhine. The wide distribution of characteristic equipment and the sometimes high quality of the votive offerings and cult objects attest to the activity of a dedicated and financially well-off group of adherents.

== Chronology and building phases ==
The chronological placement of the temple, like the various reconstruction attempts, is based primarily on the plan and section drawings produced by the Historic Preservation Office, as well as on a "memory profile" compiled only long after the destruction of the context, on the basis of interviews with private excavators. In addition, archaeological finds are taken into account; however, their precise find contexts are sufficiently documented only in exceptional cases.

Huld-Zetsche distinguishes between two construction phases; however, a closer examination suggests that there were actually three consecutive phases in total:

Phase I

A lower screed is associated with an initial cult room. No reclining benches from this phase have survived. The earliest finds from the excavation area, all lacking stratigraphic context, are attributed to this phase. These include plain, partly stamped pottery vessels, an inkwell, a fragment of horse harness, and relief bowls made of Terra Sigillata. On the basis of this assemblage, Huld-Zetsche dates the construction of a first temple building to around 70 AD. The small number of contemporary coin finds—only a single coin of Vespasian—is, according to Huld-Zetsche, not decisive given the generally high loss rate of numismatic material. What is more important, she argues, is that this represents a coherent group of early-dating finds rather than isolated residual material.

Phase II

Several layers interpreted as occupation surfaces are considered to represent the floor level of a building to which all surviving stone architectural remains of the sanctuary are assigned. Immediately above this level of use was the deposition of the snake vessel placed next to a bowl.

Phase III

As a remnant of the southern podium of a conversion or new construction phase, a slightly higher screed is interpreted. In this context, the two altars (see above), which date to the Severan period, are associated with this phase. The beginning of this building phase presupposes the abandonment and systematic backfilling of the earlier structure around 200 AD. The assemblage of the serpent vessel and the bowl is considered to have been carefully deposited during this reconfiguration. Andreas Hansen notes in this context that the serpent vessel would at that time already have been at least seven decades old.

The surface of the presumed bench was covered by a thin occupation layer, from which several coins were recovered. The latest coin dates to 324 AD. Overlying deposits contained further coins, the latest of which is dated to 348 AD. The entire coin assemblage is assigned to the final phase of use of the temple.

For the 3rd and 4th centuries, a marked decline in find density is observed. However, this is not necessarily to be interpreted as evidence of decline, but is more likely due to modern overbuilding of the area in the 19th century, which destroyed substantial parts of the upper Roman strata.

Huld-Zetsche considers several possible scenarios for the demise of the Mithraeum: it may have been voluntarily abandoned, destroyed during Germanic incursions, or fallen victim to Christian iconoclasm. At present, there is no reliable archaeological evidence to support any of these hypotheses.

Within Mainz, the temple at Ballplatz square was probably the most significant: its size, equipment, and a dedication by a high-ranking military figure lead to this assumption. Huld-Zetsche suggests that the community experienced a rupture with the withdrawal of the 22nd Legion in the mid-4th century, and considers it possible that the now considerably reduced Mithras community in Mainz subsequently used only this presumed main sanctuary. It should be noted, however, that no military objects have been found among the assemblage, and that, according to current knowledge, the military did not play as large a role as had long been assumed in earlier scholarship.

If these chronological considerations are correct, the site would be one of the earliest examples of Mithras worship in the Roman Empire. Horn had already counted the Mainz Mithraeum among the oldest known sites north of the Alps; however, he based this assessment on his significantly earlier dating of the serpent vessel. Such an early dating could not be verified by recent research on Wetterau ware. According to current knowledge, the earliest archaeological evidence of the cult of Mithras dates to around 100 CE.

By contrast, the end of use defined by coin finds (phase III) fits into the broader spectrum of Mithraea that remained in operation into the late 4th century and, in some cases, possibly beyond. It was not until the end of the 4th century that followers of Mithras, under Emperor Theodosius I, faced a strict ban on visiting pagan sanctuarys. This ban was enshrined in law in two edicts of 391/392 CE.

However, analyses of votive coin deposits and hoards suggest that many temples were still visited in the following decades—presumably in secret.

The reconstruction of the building history of the temple must, on the whole, be regarded with caution. Due to the absence of stratigraphic analysis, all attempts at phasing or more refined chronological classification remain purely hypothetical. Richard Gordon has already clearly identified the central weaknesses of Huld-Zetsches line of argument. Neither the earlier screed of phase I nor the later screed of phase III can be unambiguously linked to specific structural remains. Moreover, no securely early-dated object from the chronologically sensitive assemblage can be confidently assigned to the occupation layers above these screeds. The area of the sanctuary formed part of the building ground of the canabae legionis, which had been continuously used since the establishment of the legionary camp; accordingly, it is unsurprising that 1st-century pottery occurs there in large quantities. However, this does not provide any reliable evidence for an unusually early establishment of Mithras worship in Mainz. The only remains that can be reliably identified are those attributed to Phase II, which form the documented floor plan and whose interpretation as a Mithras temple can be considered certain. The serpent vessel and the two altars mark the period during which the existence and activity of a Mithras community at the site can be proven beyond doubt.

== Bibliography ==
- Huld-Zetsche, Ingeborg, Der Mithraskult in Mainz und das Mithräum am Ballplatz (Mainz, 2008).
- Hensen, Andreas, "Mithras. Der Kult des Unbesiegten und sein Tempel in Mainz", in Nina Gallion and Johannes Lipps (eds.), Beten in Mainz. Religion als Herausforderung in der Geschichte der Stadt (Oppenheim, 2023), pp. 73–100.
