= Tabula ansata =

Tablet with dovetail handles

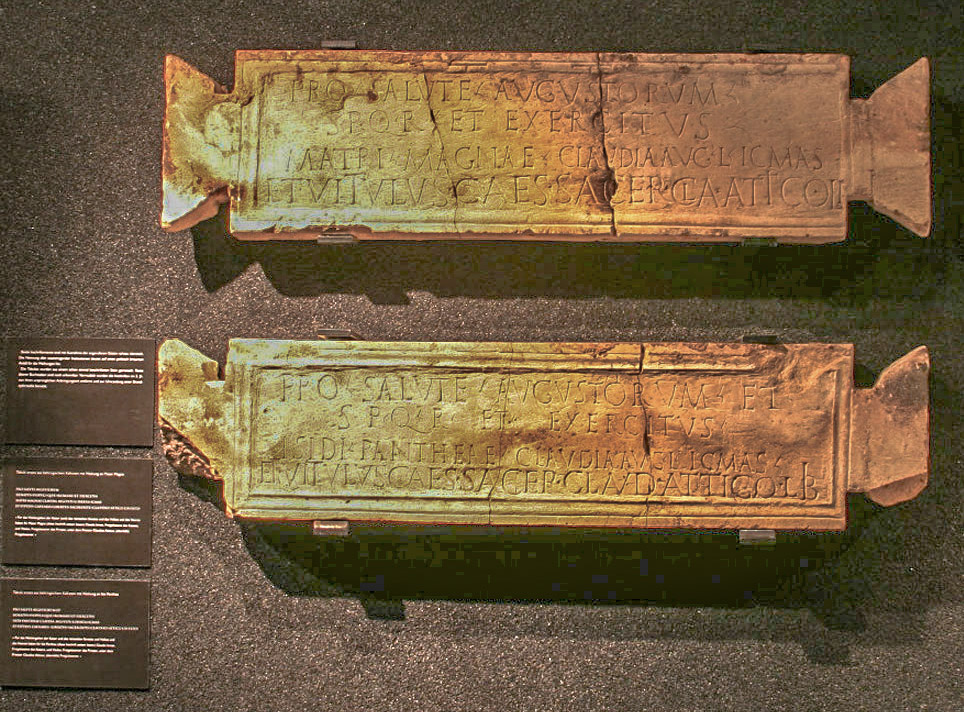
Tabulae ansatae from the sanctuary of Isis and Magna Mater in Mainz

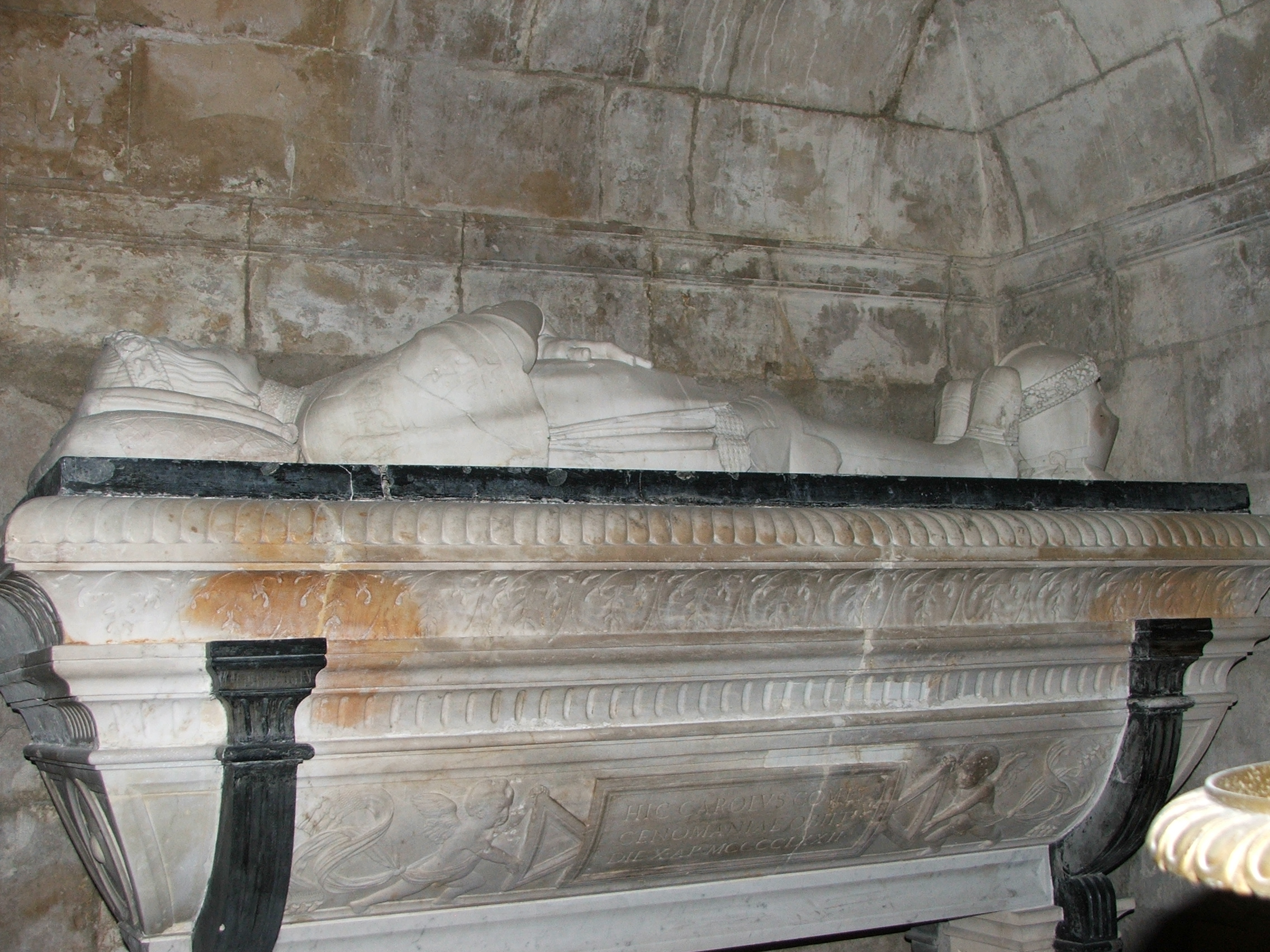
Tabula ansata relief on the tomb of Charles, Count of Maine attributed to Francesco Laurana, in Le Mans Cathedral

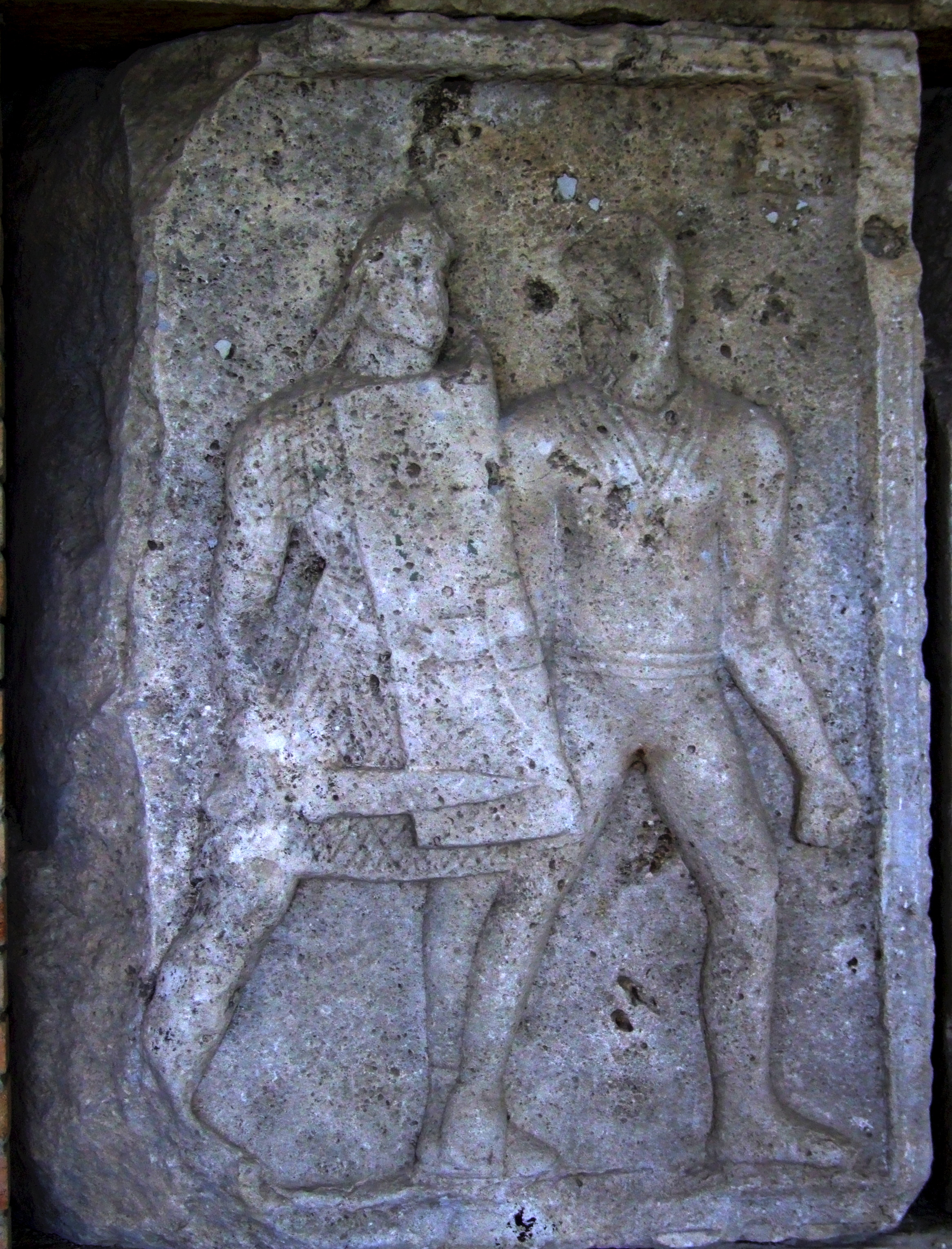
A tabula ansata on the right side of the boss on a soldier shield, metope XXIV from Tropaeum Traiani

A tabula ansata or tabella ansata (Latin for "tablet with handles", plural tabulae ansatae or tabellae ansatae) is a tablet with dovetail handles. It was a favorite form for votive tablets in Imperial Rome.

== Overview ==
Tabulae ansatae identifying soldiers' units have been found on the tegimenta (leather covers) of shields, for example in Vindonissa (Windisch, Switzerland). Sculptural evidence, for example on the metopes from the Tropaeum Traiani (Adamclisi, Romania), shows that they were also used for the same purpose on the shields.

== Modern era ==
Tabulae ansatae have been used by modern artists from as early as the 15th century, as shown on the tomb of Charles, Count of Maine, attributed to Francesco Laurana, in Le Mans Cathedral. The Statue of Liberty by sculptor Auguste Bartholdi is holding one such tablet on which "July IV MDCCLXXVI" is inscribed.

== Gallery ==
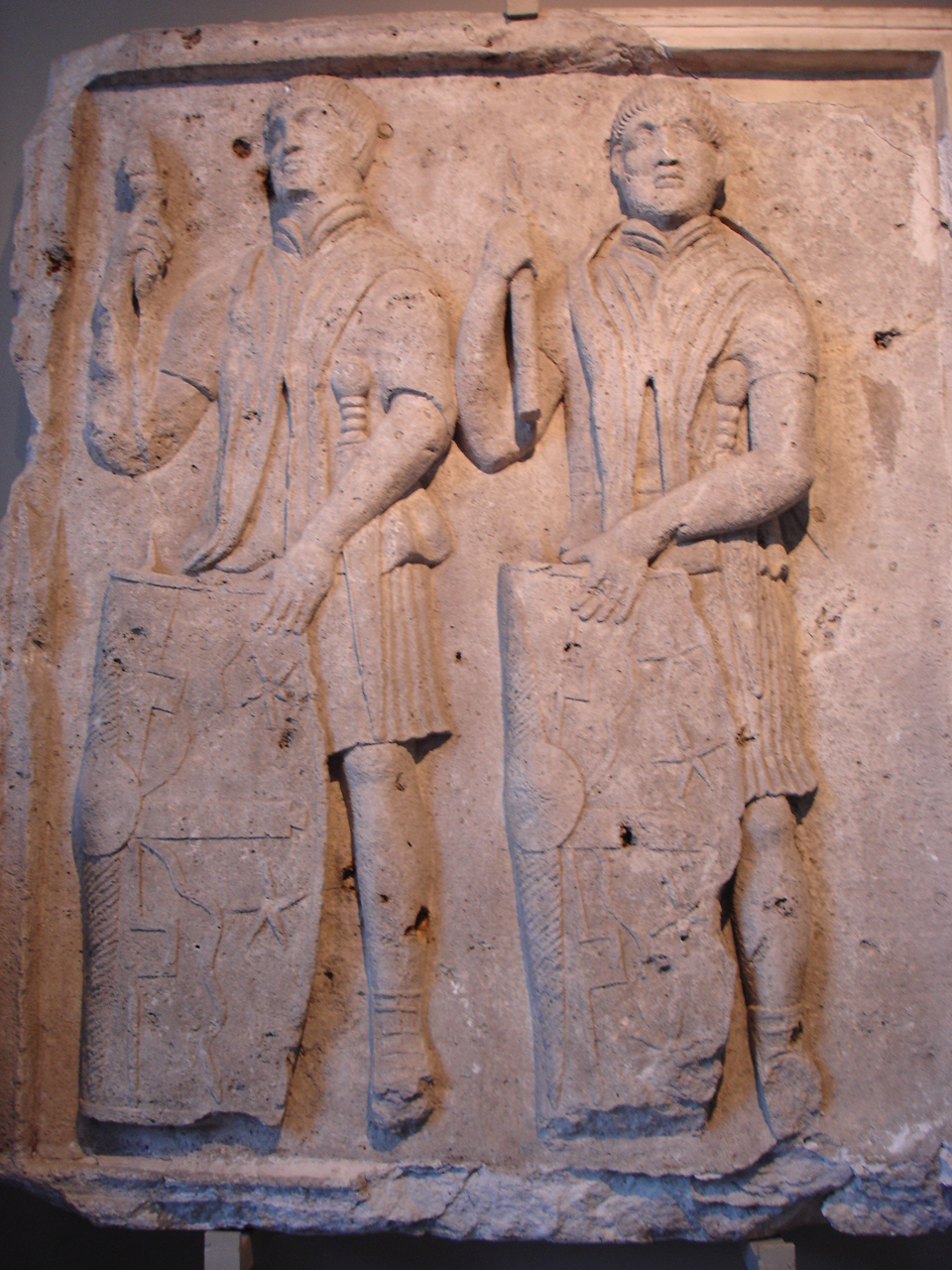
Tabulae ansatae on soldiers' shields – metope from the Tropaeum Traiani, Archaeological Museum of Istanbul

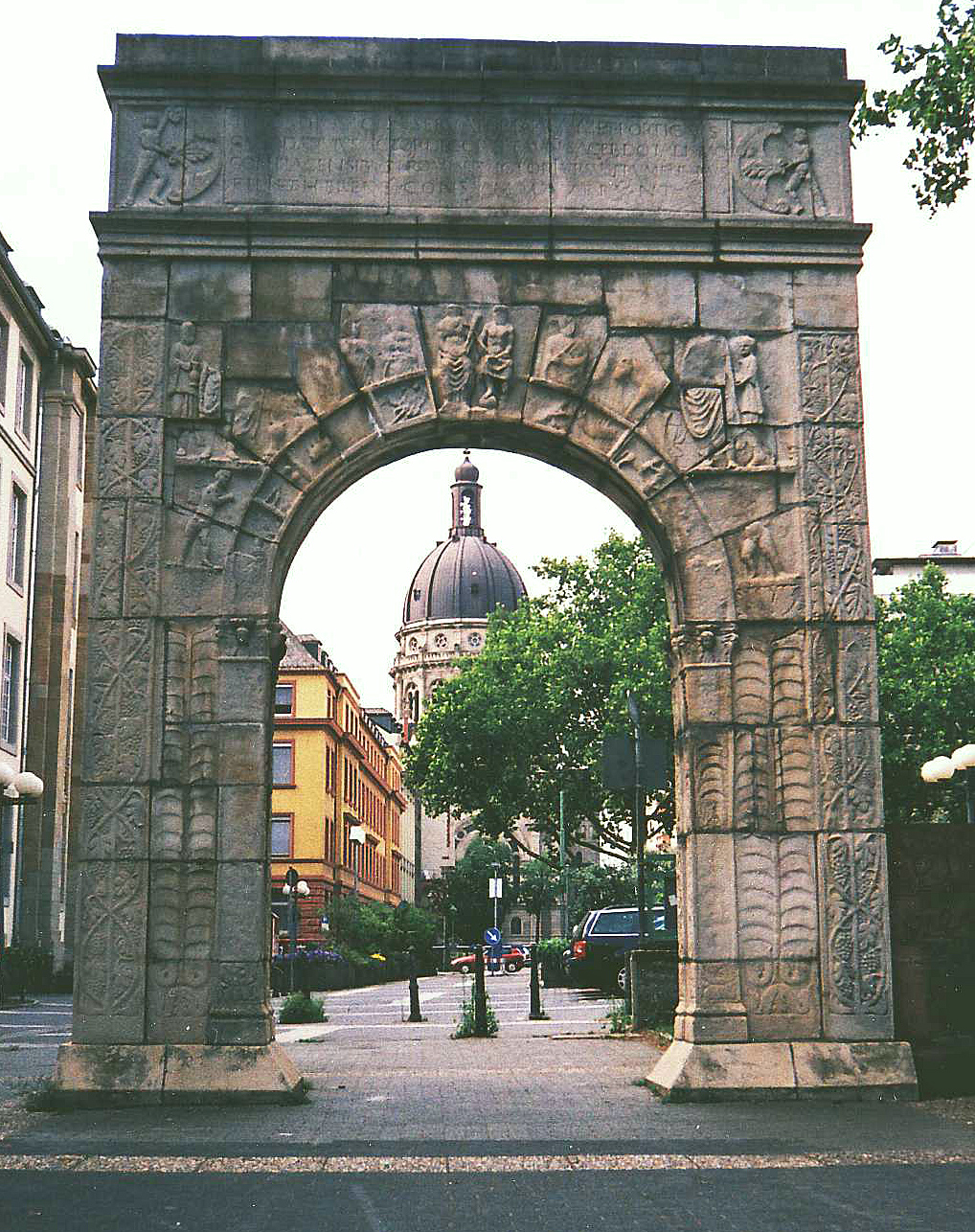
A tabula ansata on the attic of the arch of Dativius Victor (de) in Mainz

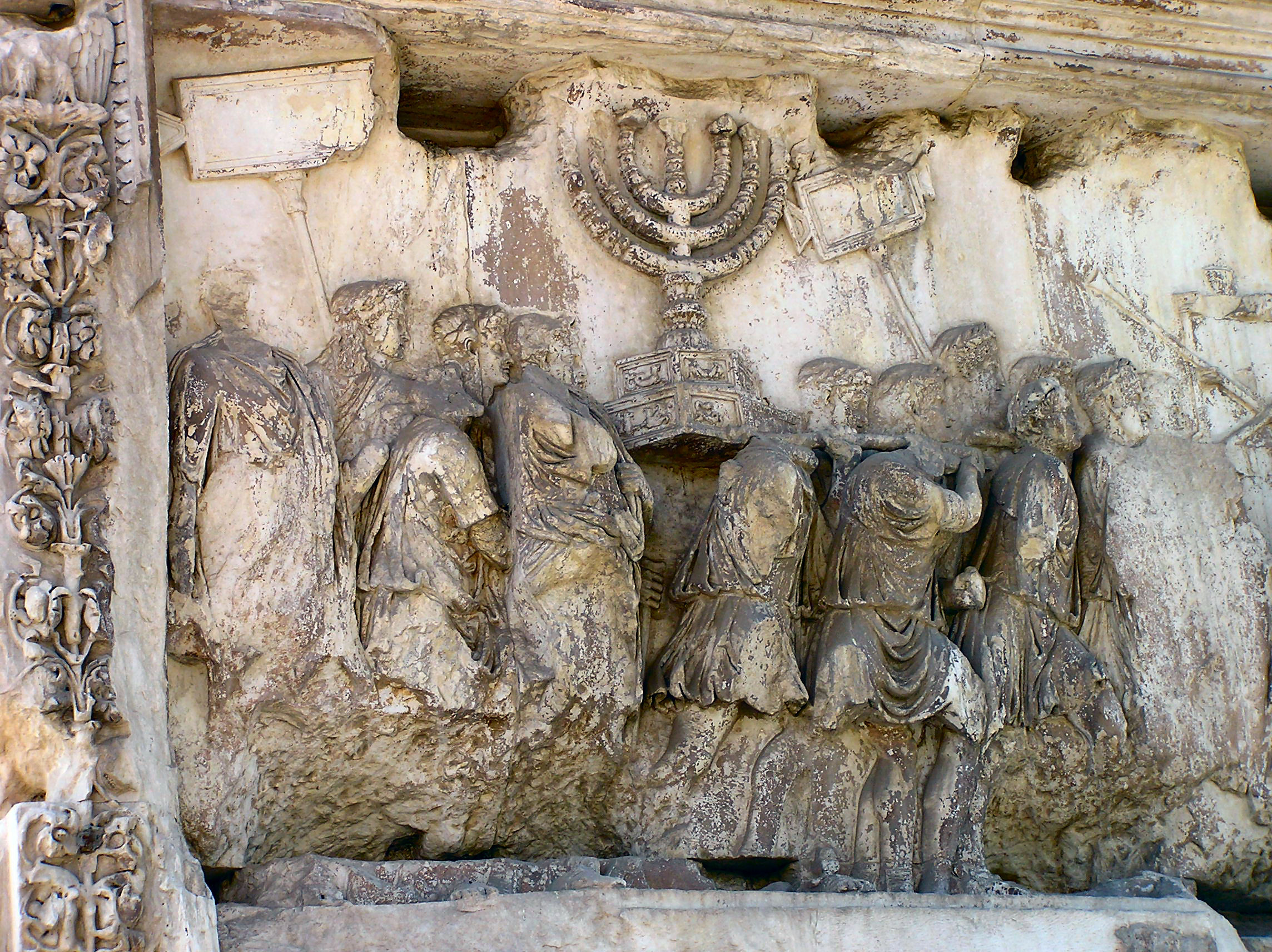
Tabulae ansatae carried on sticks – Arch of Titus

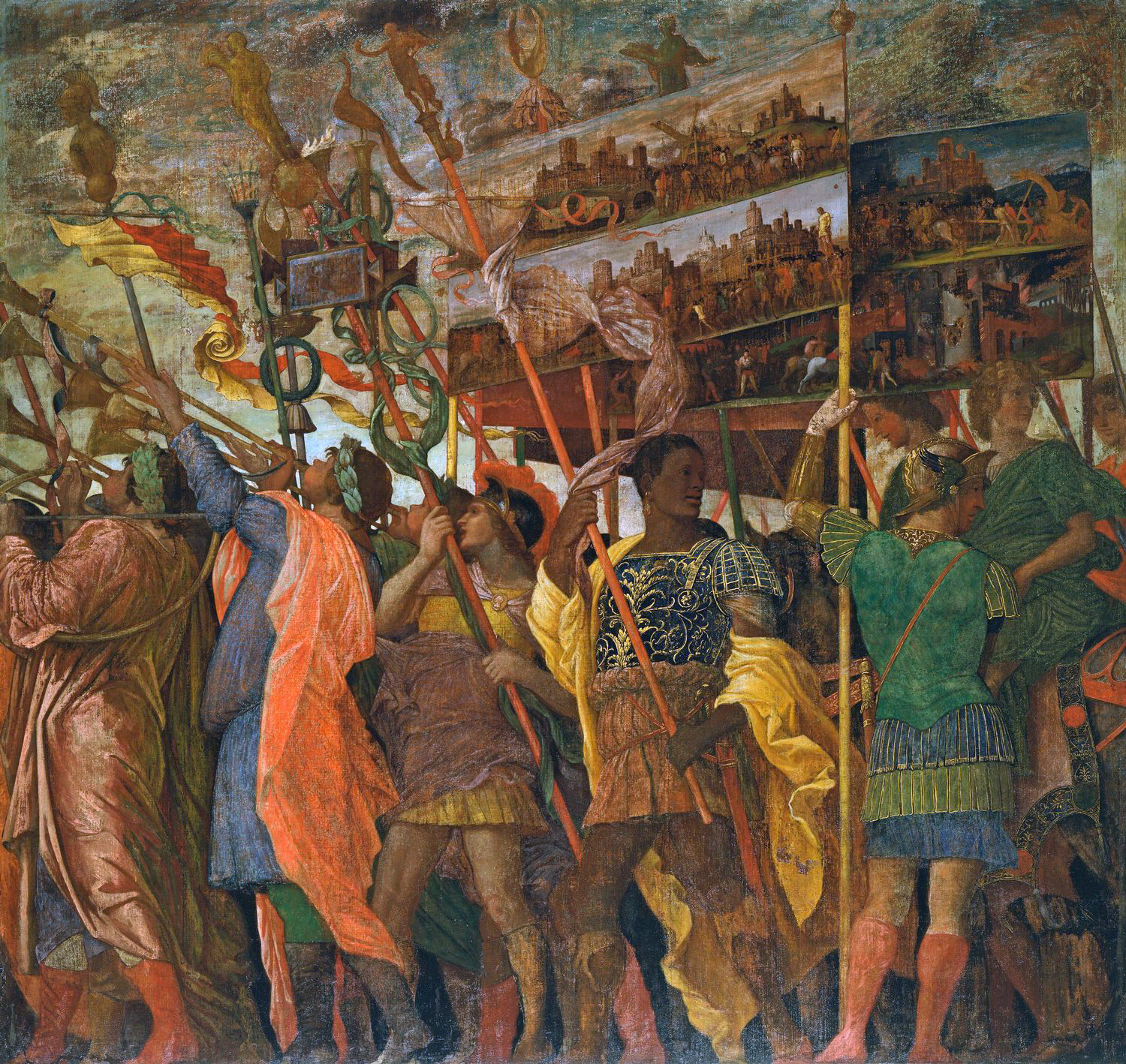
A tabula ansata carried on a stick – Triumphs of Caesar by Andrea Mantegna

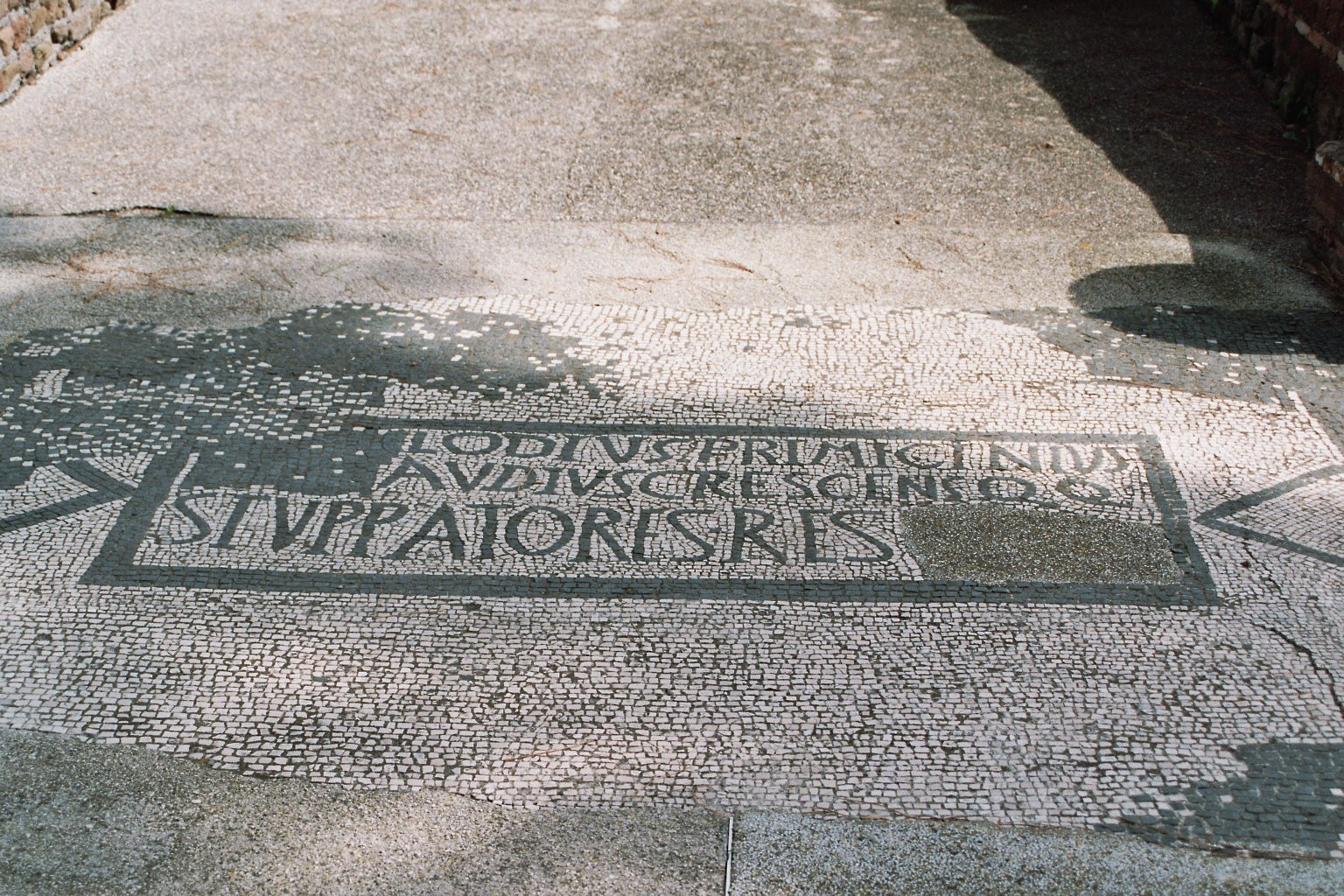
Tabula ansata on a mosaic in Ostia Antica

Tabula ansata on George Bancroft's bookplate

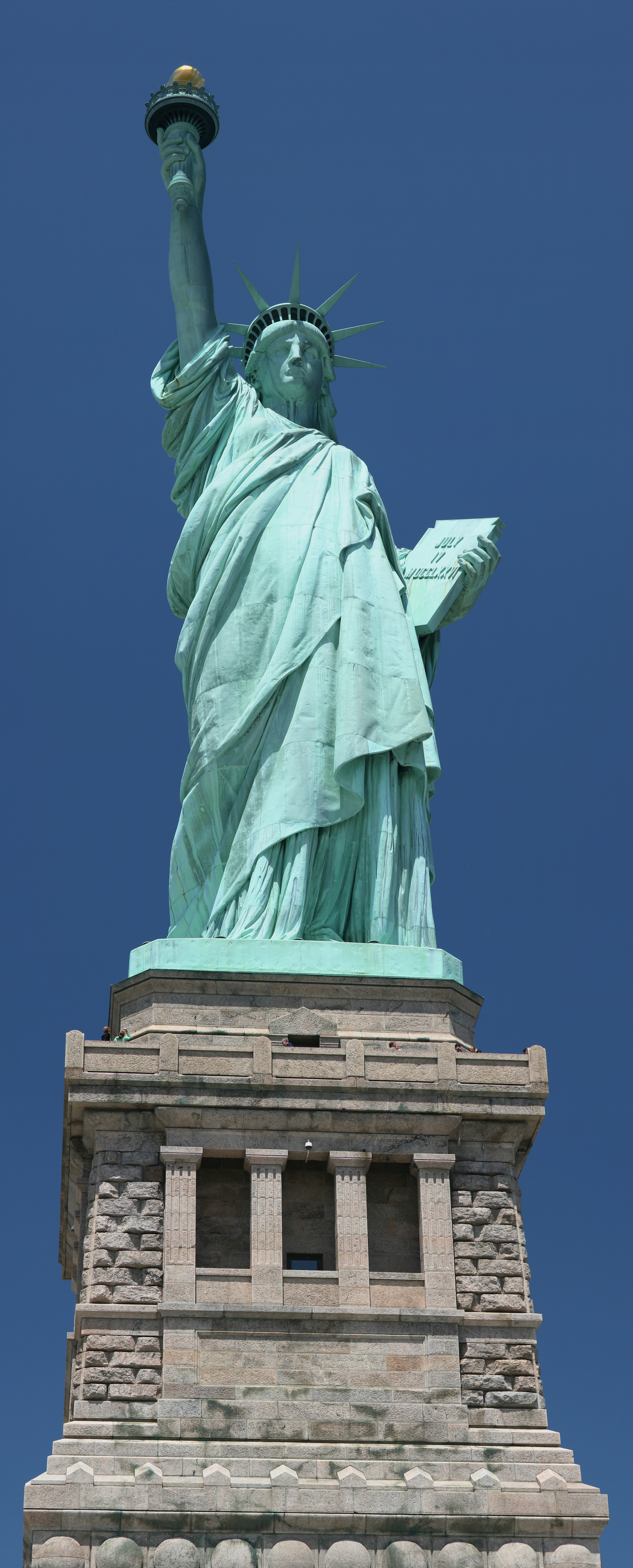
The Statue of Liberty (formally Liberty Enlightening the World) holds a tabula ansata inscribed with "July 4 1776" in Roman numerals

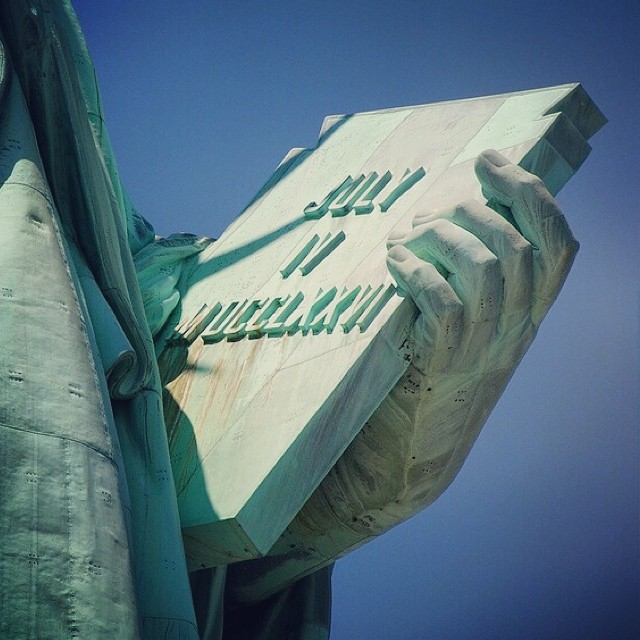
Detail of the Statue of Liberty's tabula
