= Stefan Krmnicek =

Czech-German academic

Stefan Krmnicek is a Czech-German professor at the University of Tübingen and director of the Numismatische Arbeitsstelle specializing in the cultural history of money and coinage, particularly in relation to archaeology, numismatics, anthropology, and sociology. His work also extends into the digital humanities through archaeogaming and virtual reality.

== Biography ==
Krmnicek studied in Vienna, Padova, Frankfurt and Cambridge and obtained his PhD under the supervision of Hans-Markus von Kaenel. His doctoral research examined the coin finds from the Iron Age and Roman transitional period at the Magdalensberg site in Noricum. Following his doctorate, he held a postdoctoral research position at the School of Archaeology and Ancient History at the University of Leicester before joining the University of Tübingen.

== Select books ==
- 2025 - Sylloge Nummorum Graecorum Tübingen. Band 7. Ägypten. Alexandria und Gaumünzen. Augustus – Diocletianus. Heidelberg: Propylaeum eBooks. (with E. Meral)
- 2023 - Römische Archäologie in Deutschland. Positionsbestimmung und Perspektiven. Heidelberg: Propylaeum-DOK. (ed. with D. Maschek)
- 2023 - Institutions and Individuals. The Numismatic World in the Long Nineteenth Century, Volume 2. Routledge Studies in Cultural History 127. London: Routledge. (ed. with Hadrien J. Rambach)
- 2023 - Academia and Trade. The Numismatic World in the Long Nineteenth Century, Volume 1. Routledge Studies in Cultural History 126. London: Routledge. (ed. with Hadrien J. Rambach)
- 2020 - The Oxford Handbook of the Archaeology of Roman Germany. Oxford: Oxford University Press (with S. James)
- 2019 – (ed.) A Cultural History of Money in Antiquity (paperpack edition 2023); Chinese edition: 货币文化史I 希腊罗马时期.钱币的诞生与权力象征, Shanghai: Wenhui Publishing House (2022).
- 2019 - Money Matters : Coin Finds and Ancient Coin Use. Bonn : Verlag Dr. Rudolph Habelt GmbH (ed. with Jérémie Chameroy)
- 2017 – (ed.) Theodor Mommsen (1817-1903) auf Medaillen und Plaketten. Sammlung des Instituts für Klassische Archäologie der Universität Tübingen. Von Krösus bis zu König Wilhelm, Neue Serie 2. Tübingen: Universitätsbibliothek Tübingen.
- 2014 - 'Art in the Round': New Approaches to Ancient Coin Iconography. Tübinger Archäologische Forschungen 16. Rahden/Westf.: Marie Leidorf (ed. with N.T. Elkins)
