= Mogontiacum =

Roman name of today's city of Mainz, Germany

- Moguntiacum
- City map of Mogontiacum in the period 1st century BCE to 5th century CE
- Interactive map of Mogontiacum
- Type: Roman city
- Periods: Roman Empire
- Location: Mainz, Germany

History
- Built: 13/12 BCE

Mogontiacum (also Moguntiacum) is the Latin name of today's city of Mainz, which it bore during its almost 500 years as part of the Roman Empire. Mogontiacum had its origins in the legionary camp built by Drusus in 13/12 BCE, which was strategically located on a hill above the Rhine and opposite the mouth of the Main on the Roman Rhine valley road.

The civilian settlements (vici) in the vicinity of the camp, which spread down the Rhine, quickly grew together to form a larger, urbanised settlement. However, unlike Colonia Claudia Ara Agrippinensium (Cologne) or Augusta Treverorum (Trier), Mogontiacum was primarily a military centre until the second half of the 4th century and was apparently not a colonia either. As a result, it never had the urban character of the other large Roman cities in Germany. Nevertheless, several monumental buildings were also erected here, as Mogontiacum was the provincial capital of the Roman province of Germania Superior with the seat of the governor as of the year 90 at the latest. After the middle of the 3rd century, when the Romans evacuated the Decumatian Fields, Mogontiacum once again became a border town and was devastated several times over the next 150 years by members of various Germanic peoples. After the end of the Roman period, but at the latest around 470, Mogontiacum belonged to the Frankish Kingdom after a brief transitional phase.

Some important remains of Mogontiacum have been preserved in the present-day city of Mainz, for example the Roman stage theatre, the Great Mainz Jupiter Column, the Drusus Stone and the Roman Stones, remains of the aqueduct of the legionary camp. The Roman-Germanic Central Museum, the Mainz State Museum and the Museum of Ancient Seafaring preserve numerous artefacts from Roman rule in Mainz.

== Naming ==
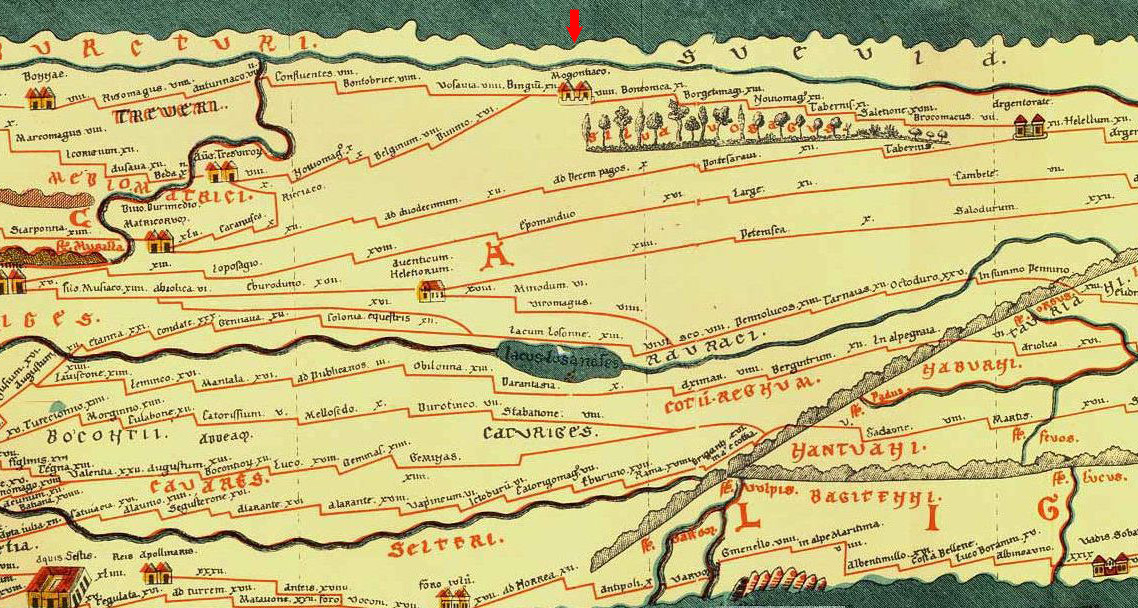
Location of Moguntiaco on the Tabula Peutingeriana

The name Mogontiacum is composed of the Celtic name Mogo(n), the Celtic suffix -ontiu- (as in Vesontio/Besançon) and the affiliation suffix *-āko, Latinised to -(i)acum. It thus contains the name of the Celtic god Mogon as a component. The name could have been derived from a Celtic settlement of the Aresaces, a section of the Treveri people, located in the immediate vicinity of the legionary camp. These were located at the end of the first century BCE in the area of today's Mainz-Weisenau and Mainz-Bretzenheim. Mogontiacum was first mentioned in historiography by the Roman historian Tacitus in his work Histories, written at the beginning of the 2nd century, in connection with the Revolt of the Batavi. The derived spelling Moguntiacum is also common. Abbreviations and different spellings were also common at the time of Roman rule. For example, Moguntiacum was abbreviated to Moguntiaco in the Tabula Peutingeriana. Epigraphically, the city name is first documented on a milestone from the Claudian period.

== History ==
The almost 500-year Roman history of Mogontiacum can be divided into four simplified periods: The first period begins with the founding of the city towards the end of the 1st century BCE and ends with the establishment of the province of Germania superior and the appointment of Mogontiacum as the provincial capital. The period between 90 CE and 260 CE covers the city's golden age until the fall of the Limes, when Mogontiacum once again became a border town of the Roman Empire. In the third period, from 260 to 350 CE, the city underwent profound changes in the face of internal turbulence in the Roman Empire and the growing threat from Germanic warriors. The final period from 350 CE to 470 CE reflects the decline of the city, which was plundered and devastated several times.

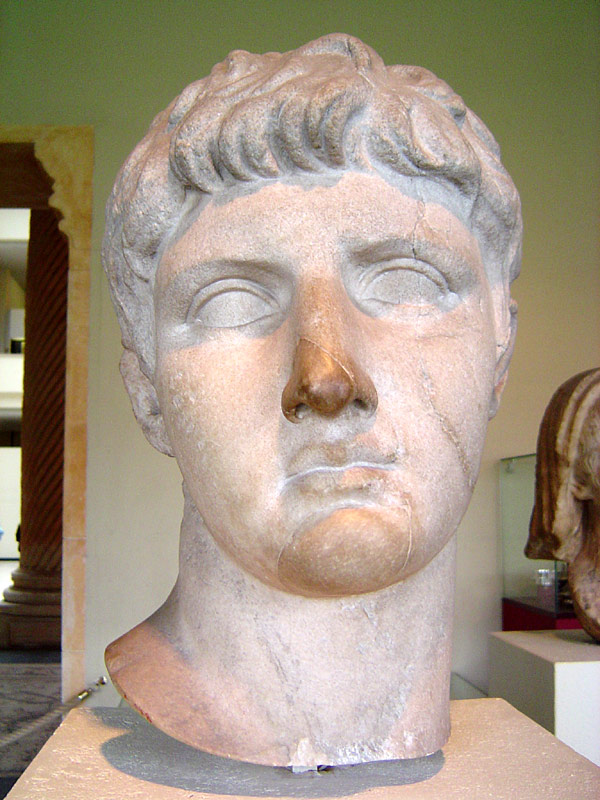
Bust of Drusus, the founder of Mogontiacum (Musée du Cinquantenaire, Brussels)

=== Foundation of Mogontiacum and history until Domitian (13/12 BCE to 90) ===
In the course of Augustus' expansionist endeavours starting in 16 BCE, his stepson Nero Claudius Drusus also advanced to the Middle Rhine and secured the area for the Roman Empire. By 13/12 BCE at the latest, possibly earlier, a double legionary camp was established on a hill above the Rhine and opposite the mouth of the Main. The military presence of the Romans at this location primarily secured their control over the Middle Rhine, the mouth of the Main and generally over the Main as one of the main routes into free Germania.

At the same time, another military camp was built just four kilometres south of today's Mainz district of Weisenau. This was mainly occupied by auxiliary troops, but was also used temporarily for the stationing of other legionaries. This was also the site of one of the late Latène Celtic settlements in the Mainz area. The local Celtic population belonged to the Aresaces, a section of the Gallic Treveri, who were located here in their settlement area furthest to the east.

Until the annexation plans were abandoned in 16 BCE, Mogontiacum served several times as a base for military operations as part of the Drusus campaigns (12 to 8 BCE), the campaign against the kingdom of Marbod (6 CE) and the Germanicus campaigns (14 to 16 CE) in Germania on the eastern side of the Rhine. Shortly afterwards, legionaries in Mogontiacum erected a cenotaph in the immediate vicinity of their camp to honor Drusus, who had died in 9 BCE. This monument is probably identical to the Drusus Stone on the Mainz citadel that still exists today. As early as the time of Drusus, a ship bridge was built above the mouth of the Main to cross the Rhine. In the first decade of the 1st century BCE, the bridgehead Castellum (Castellum Mattiacorum) on the right bank of the Rhine was founded and expanded, which became the nucleus of today's Mainz-Kastel (derived from the Latin castellum). The construction of a fixed wooden bridge (pile bridge) between Mogontiacum and Castellum can be dated to the year 27.

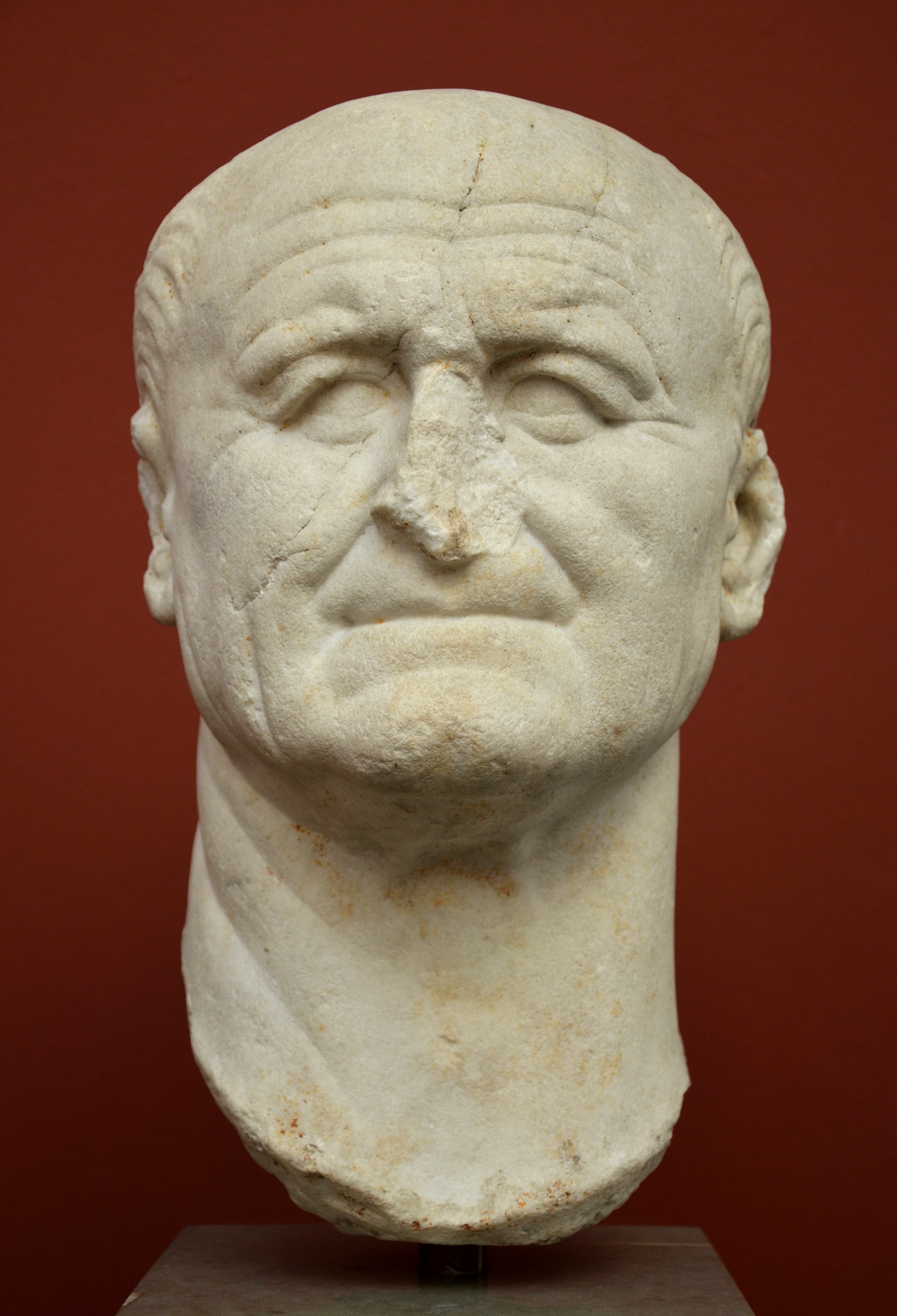
Portrait of Vespasian, Ny Carlsberg Glyptotek, Copenhagen

After the reorganisation of the Roman Rhine army into an Upper and a Lower Germanic army in the year 17, Mogontiacum became the seat of the commander of the Upper Germanic army. In addition to the rapidly forming camp suburbs (canabae legionis) in the south and south-west of the legionary camp, various civilian settlements (vici) developed, which stretched eastwards down to the Rhine and possibly slowly merged into a coherent settlement structure during the course of the 1st century. In the first half of the 1st century, Mogontiacum already had large civilian buildings with a large public thermal bath complex and a theatre mentioned by the Roman writer Suetonius. The Great Column of Jupiter in Mainz, dated to the third quarter of the 1st century, was donated by an apparently wealthy larger civilian community and can be seen as evidence of the rapid progress of Mogontiacum's civilian development. Despite the beginning development of civilian structures, Mogontiacum remained one of the most important military bases of the Roman army on the Rhine. Two legions, including auxiliaries and baggage train, were permanently stationed in Mogontiacum and in the second military camp in Weisenau, which had been expanded since the reign of Caligula. Additional troops were stationed as required - for example, after the Varus Battle, when three legions were temporarily stationed in Mogontiacum.

During the Revolt of the Batavi, most of the civilian buildings outside the legionary camp were destroyed. According to Tacitus, the camp itself was besieged without success. Under the rule of the Flavian imperial family, extensive building work was carried out in Mogontiacum. Vespasian had the legionary camp rebuilt in stone, and likewise sponsored new stone piers for the pile bridge. During the reign of Emperor Domitian, a stone aqueduct replaced its wooden predecessor. The aqueduct carried fresh water over a distance of nine kilometres from the springs in today's distant Mainz districts of Finthen (Fontanetum) and Drais to the legionary camp on the Kästrich.

In 83, the city was the starting point for Emperor Domitian's campaign against the Chatti. To this end, he assembled an army of five legions and auxiliary troops in Mogontiacum. In 88 and 89, the governor Lucius Antonius Saturninus revolted in Mogontiacum. After the rapid suppression, the military territory was transformed into the province of Germania superior with Mogontiacum as the provincial capital (caput provinciae), which had already been planned beforehand and was thus finalised.

=== Provincial capital and important military centre on the Rhine (90 to 260) ===
The process of transforming the military territory into the province of Germania superior began in the mid-80s of the 1st century and was fully completed by the middle of the year 90 at the latest. A military diploma dated 27 October 90 is considered the earliest epigraphic evidence of the newly established province. With Lucius Javolenus Priscus, the province was given a consular governor who was already experienced as a suffect consul and who quickly developed the necessary civil structures. Beginning under Domitian and continuing under his successors, the Romans secured areas on the right bank of the Rhine to protect the new provinces and consolidate their territory. With the permanent occupation of the Neuwieder Basin, the Taunus and the Wetterau, the Upper Germanic-Rhaetian Limes was created. Mogontiacum now assumed the important role of military administrative centre for the Upper Germanic section of the Limes until its downfall.

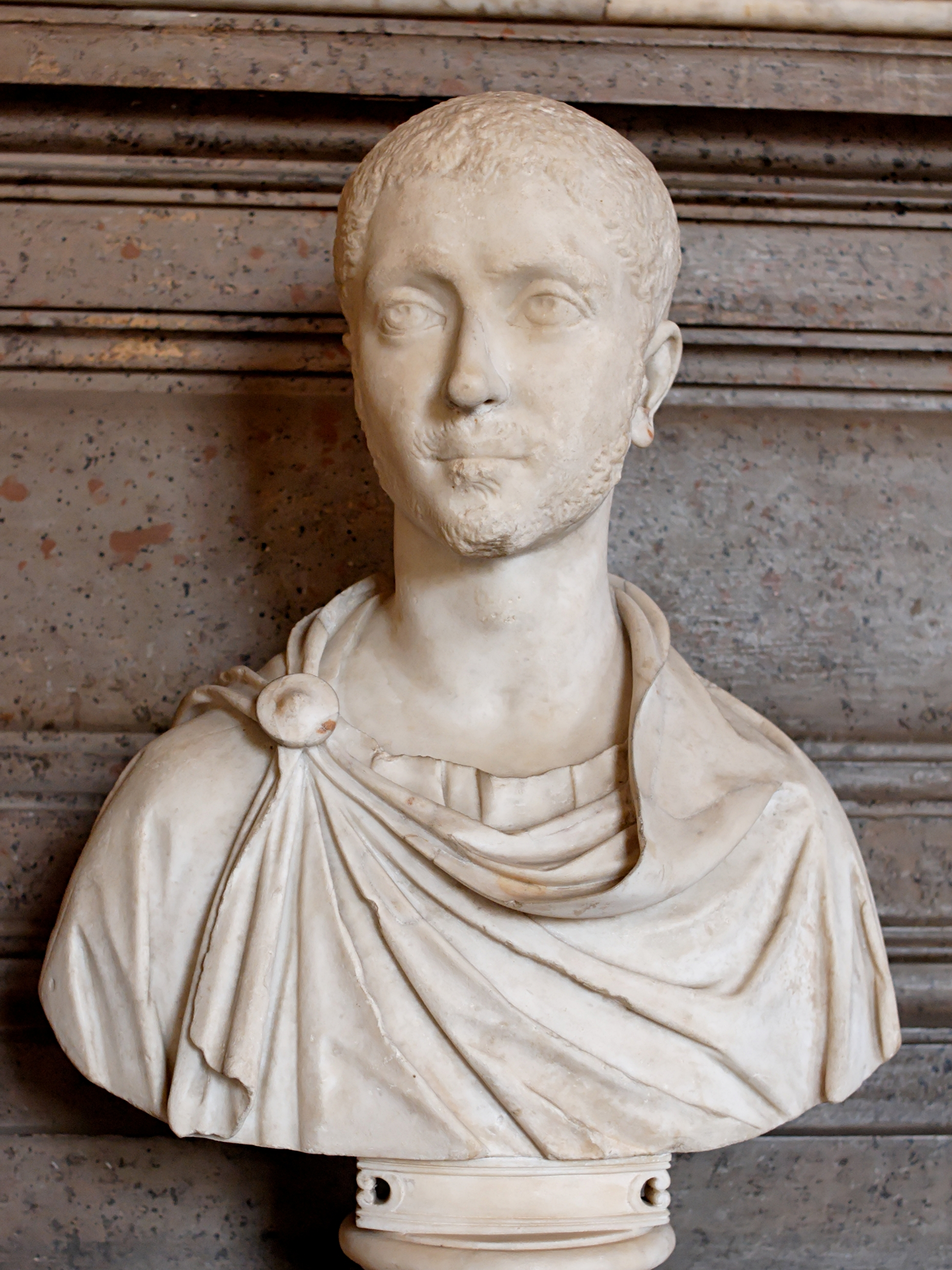
Marble bust of Severus Alexander (Capitoline Museums, Rome)

There were also lasting changes for Mogontiacum itself: As a result of the experiences of Saturninus' revolt, the number of permanently stationed legions was reduced from two to one. From the year 92, this was the Legio XXII Primigenia, which from then on remained the sole legion of Mainz until its defeat in the middle of the 4th century. From 96 to 98, the later Emperor Trajan held the office of governor of the province; Hadrian, his successor, had also been stationed there as part of his previous career as a military tribune. A time of peace and prosperity dawned for Mogontiacum. The border with free Germania was far advanced and secured by the increasingly elaborate Limes. Trade and crafts flourished in the city and throughout the surrounding area, where many veterans of the military troops settled. The invasion of the Rhine-Main region by the Chatti in 162 and again in 169, as well as the crossing of the Rhine, remained one-off events for the time being without any major impact.

It would take until 19(?) March 235 for Mogontiacum to once again become the focus of Roman world history. As part of the preparations for a campaign against the Alemanni, Emperor Severus Alexander gathered troops in Mogontiacum. There he and his mother Julia Mamaea were murdered by Roman legionaries during riots in or near Mogontiacum in the vicus Britannicus (Bretzenheim?). This was immediately followed by the proclamation of the military commander Gaius Iulius Verus Maximinus (with the later acquired epithet Thrax) as his successor. This was the beginning of the era of the soldier emperors, which also coincided with the imperial crisis of the 3rd century.

Around the year 250 or a little later, the civilian settlement on the Rhine was surrounded by a city wall. This enclosed the entire previously populated area as well as the large stage theatre, but not the camp canabae to the southwest. This first city wall extended to the fortified legionary camp in the south-west of the city, which supplemented the city wall at this point with its own fortifications. As the so-called Limesfall is generally dated to the year 259/260, the two events are not directly connected, as previously assumed. Rather, the presence of Roman troops, who repeatedly had to deploy large detachments for campaigns in distant areas and were distracted by a series of civil wars, was probably no longer considered sufficient to protect the city against raiders. With the abandonment of the Upper Germanic Limes, Mogontiacum once again became a border town - despite further use of areas on the right bank of the Rhine, such as the Castellum bridgehead or the thermal baths in neighbouring Aquae Mattiacorum (Wiesbaden).

=== Mogontiacum as a border town after the fall of the Limes (260 to 350) ===
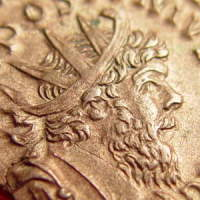
Portrait of Postumus, first emperor of the Gallic Empire and assassinated in Mogontiacum in 269 on an Antoninian

Almost at the same time as the "Limesfall", there was another significant change in the political situation that directly affected Mogontiacum. After Marcus Cassianius Latinius Postumus had succeeded in 260 in uniting parts of the Roman Empire into the so-called Gallic Empire, Mogontiacum also belonged to this state structure until 274. In Mogontiacum, the legate Laelianus proclaimed himself counter-emperor against Postumus in 269. Although Postumus defeated Laelianus in the subsequent civil war and recaptured Mogontiacum, he died immediately afterwards at the hands of his own soldiers, as he did not want to release the city for plundering. From 274, the Gallic special empire no longer existed and Mogontiacum once again belonged to the Roman Empire.

In the course of the Diocletianic reforms and in particular after the reorganisation of the Roman provinces after 297, the province of Germania superior was absorbed into the (reduced) new province of Germania prima. Mogontiacum remained the seat of the provincial governor. Somewhat later, the town also functioned as the seat of two military commanders, the Dux Germaniae primae and the Dux Mogontiacensis, to whom the border army on this section of the Rhine frontier was subject. The first pictorial view of Mogontiacum on the so-called Lyon lead medallion dates from around the year 300. It depicts the walled Mogontiacum, the fixed Rhine bridge and the Castellum bridgehead on the right bank of the Rhine.

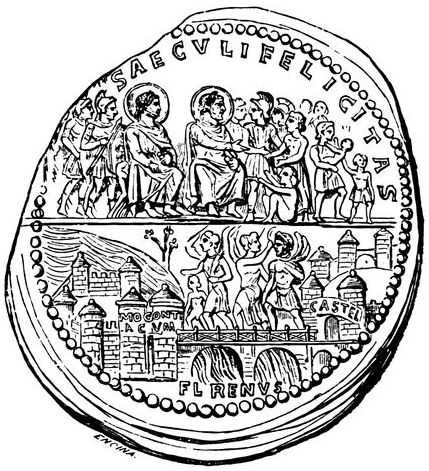
Lyon lead medallion with a stylised depiction of Moguntiacum, the Rhine bridge and Castellum

=== Decline of the city (350 to 450) ===
Around 350, the increasingly unstable political situation led to the construction of a second city wall. The military camp and the stage theatre were now located outside the secured city area and both facilities were demolished. In the years that followed, there were repeated incursions by Germanic groups, especially the Alemanni, who were even able to establish themselves temporarily on the left bank of the Rhine. The background to this was probably another civil war in the Roman Empire: in the battles between Emperor Constantius II and the usurper Magnentius, the 22nd legion was almost completely routed in the bloody Battle of Mursa in 351 and was not re-established afterwards. The milites Armigeri, possibly a surviving unit of the largely annihilated legion, now took over the protection of the city and the surrounding area. In 368, during a major Christian festival, the city was captured and plundered by the Alemanni under their leader Rando.

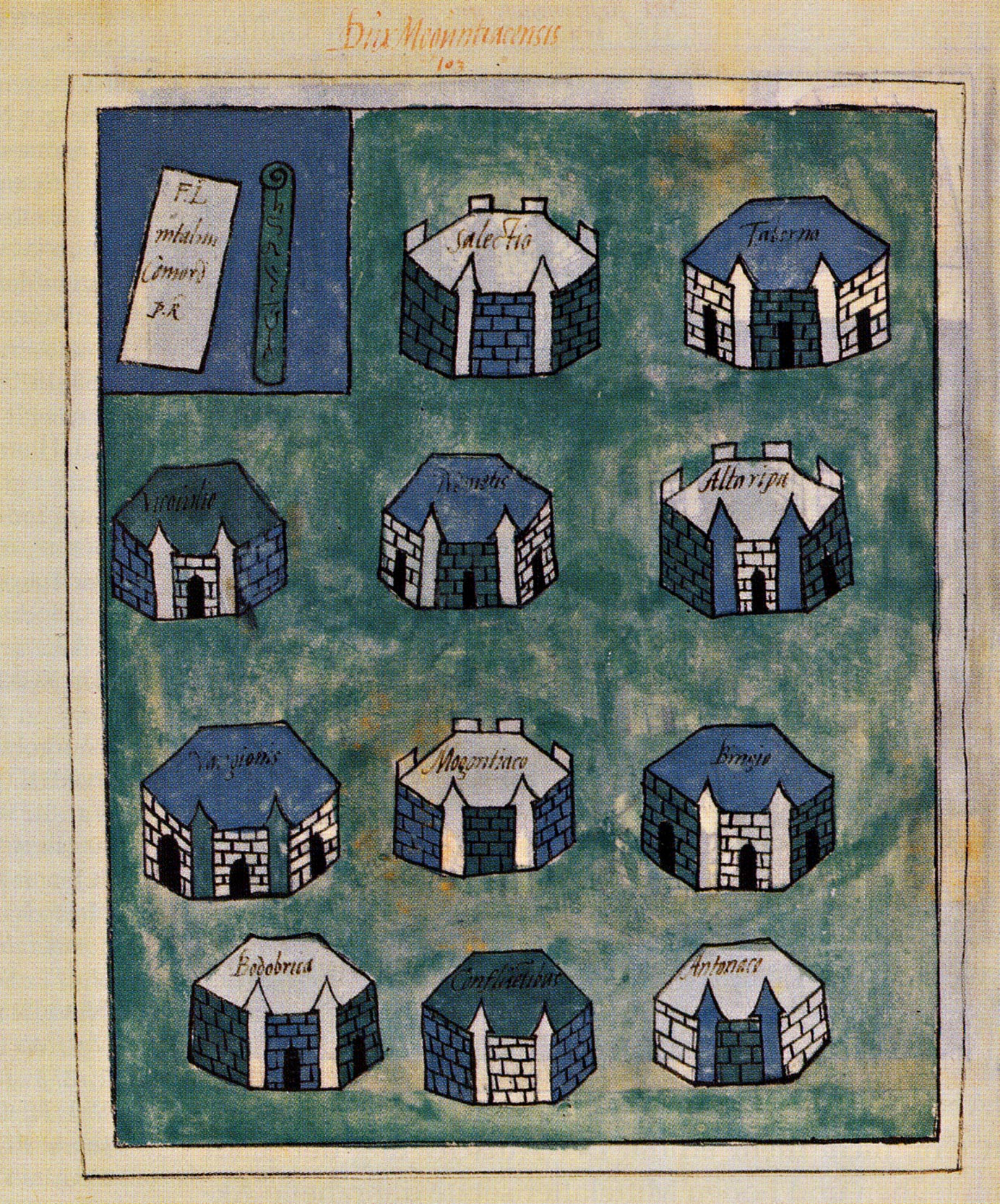
Command area of the Dux Mogontiacensis in the 4th and 5th centuries

Mogontiacum was not spared the consequences of the so-called "Migration Period" that began around 376. Endless civil wars once again led to a neglect of border defence. After 400, many regular Roman troops were withdrawn from the Rhine to Italy to take part in the fight against rebellious Visigothic foederati. Perhaps in connection with Roman civil wars and probably on New Year's Eve 406, Vandals, Suebi and Alans crossed the Rhine at Mogontiacum, presumably using the Rhine bridge, which was probably still intact at the time, and plundered and destroyed the city (see also crossing of the Rhine 406). This led to a temporary collapse of the Roman border defences, and the Roman Rhine fleet also ceased to exist at this time.

Around 411, Mogontiacum lay within the sphere of influence of the Burgundian warrior league, with whose support the usurper Jovinus was elevated to Roman emperor (possibly in Mogontiacum), although he was only able to maintain his position for a short time. The Burgundians themselves were settled as Roman foederati up the Rhine (centred on Worms/civitas Vangionum) in 413; together with regular Roman units, they monitored the border from then on. However, their sphere of influence was attacked by the Romans as early as 436 and destroyed by Hunnic auxiliaries; the survivors were resettled in Sapaudia (roughly modern-day Savoy) in 443. During Attila's invasion of Gaul in 451, the Huns crossed the Rhine at Mogontiacum. Although the city was left relatively unscathed, official Roman rule over Mogontiacum ended after this event, or at the latest in the late 460s. Civil Roman structures remained in the partially destroyed city, however, and ecclesiastical representatives of the episcopal see of Mogontiacum possibly took over administrative duties. After the Battle of Tolbiac in 496 at the latest, Mogontiacum was no longer part of the Alemanni's sphere of influence. The city now became part of the Frankish Kingdom under Clovis I.

== Military importance ==
In the historical analysis of the founding and development of Mogontiacum, there is a broad consensus that the founding of the legionary camp in 13 BCE was both the impetus and the nucleus for the later civilian settlement. Celtic settlements of the Late Latène period, which existed in Mainz-Weisenau and Mainz-Bretzenheim, were of no further significance for the development of Mogontiacum and either emerged at the same time as the beginning of the Roman presence or only existed for a short time.

The military importance of Mogontiacum continued into the first half of the 5th century. For over 350 years, it was the base of Roman legions and the starting point for campaigns into Magna Germania until the middle of the 3rd century, and to some extent even into the 4th century. For example, Drusus' campaigns, Domitian's Chatti campaign and Severus Alexander's planned campaign against the Alamanni began in Mogontiacum. After being proclaimed emperor in Mogontiacum in 235, Maximinus Thrax also led his troops far into Germania as part of the 235/236 campaign, which included the Battle at the Harzhorn.

From the end of the 1st century, Mogontiacum was the administrative and supply centre of the Upper Germanic-Rhaetian Limes. After the fall of the Limes, Mogontiacum was an important border town and the site of a Roman legion and seat of the dux Mogontiacensis until the middle of the 4th century. The military character of Mogontiacum is also reflected in the lack of town status for the civilian settlement. Nevertheless, it developed relatively quickly from the beginning of the 1st century onwards and over the next few centuries clearly took on a metropolitan character in terms of population, trade and services as well as official buildings.

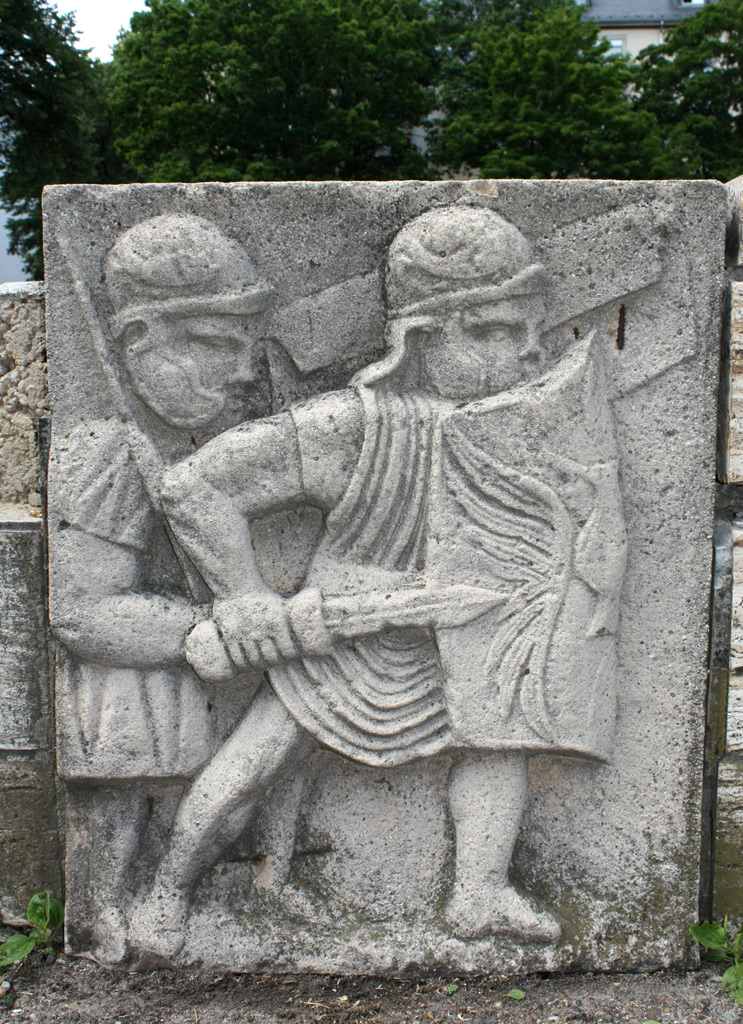
Faithful reproduction of a relief of a spolia associated with the praetorium of the legionary camp. Location: Jubilee Fountain, Ernst-Ludwig-Platz Mainz

=== Legion and military camp ===
The military camp founded by Drusus in 13/12 BCE was one of the two main bases for the planned campaigns into Magna Germania on the right bank of the Rhine. The choice of location, known today as Kästrich (derived from the Latin castra), was determined solely by strategic considerations: The Kästrich is a high plateau sloping steeply on three sides, 120 metres above "standard zero" overlooking the banks of the Rhine, which is slightly offset from the point where the Main flows into the Rhine.

The legionary camp was intended to accommodate two Roman legions (around 12,000 men) from the early Principate period. Due to the large masses of troops during the campaigns, another military camp was built in Mainz-Weisenau. Auxiliary troops were primarily stationed there, as well as other legionary troops at times.

The legionary camp on the Kästrich was built using a wood and earth technique. It had a polygonal layout and covered an area of around 36 hectares. The camp was already structurally altered in Augustan times and repeatedly in subsequent periods. Under Vespasian, the legionary camp was completely rebuilt in stone. Today, there is archaeological evidence of a total of five different rebuilding and expansion phases. After the withdrawal of the second legion in 89, the 22nd legion remained alone in the legionary camp. Experts are still debating whether the vacated area was used for the construction of the governor's palace and other administrative buildings. Around 350, the legionary camp, emptied by the decreasing presence of Roman troops in Mogontiacum and left outside the circuit of the newly-constructed second city wall, was demolished. Spolia of buildings from the camp were found in numerous forms during the demolition of the city wall foundations, especially at the end of the 19th and beginning of the 20th century. The so-called "Mainz Octagon" should be mentioned here as a representative building, which can be at least partially reconstructed thanks to extensive spolia finds that are now stored in the Mainz State Museum. Recent research has attributed it to a gateway similar to the Porta Nigra in Trier. It is possibly the monumental Porta praetoria facing the Rhine. The architectural elements can be dated to the last quarter of the 1st century by building inscriptions. The same applies to a large pillared hall with a central passageway, which may have been part of the praetorium.

At the beginning of the 20th century, the camp's thermal baths were excavated and documented in the green belt of Mainz's upper town. The course of the wall enclosure is also known, as are the locations of the camp's four gates based on the known course of the roads. During the excavations on the site of today's university clinics (Building 501) in 2003, parts of the camp's internal production facilities (fabrica) with large buildings, fortified access roads and smelting furnaces were excavated and documented. To the south and south-west of the camp were two separate and later merged camp villages (canabae legionis).

The second military camp in Mainz-Weisenau was also built on a plateau above the Rhine, roughly at the level of today's quarry of the Heidelberg cement works. Based on finds made there, it was mainly occupied by auxiliary troops who belonged to the legions in the main camp. The camp was expanded several times, for example under Caligula when he planned a campaign into Germania on the right bank of the Rhine in the year 39. In its largest expansion phase, the camp had a total size of twelve hectares. With the withdrawal of the second legion in 89 and due to the changed political situation, a second military camp was no longer needed in Mogontiacum and the camp was abandoned. Due to the current situation - the site in question has been used as a quarry since the mid-19th century - there are no longer any traces of the camp.

Another military camp for auxiliary troops on the Hartenberg is suspected, but has not yet been archaeologically verified.

=== Stationed troops ===
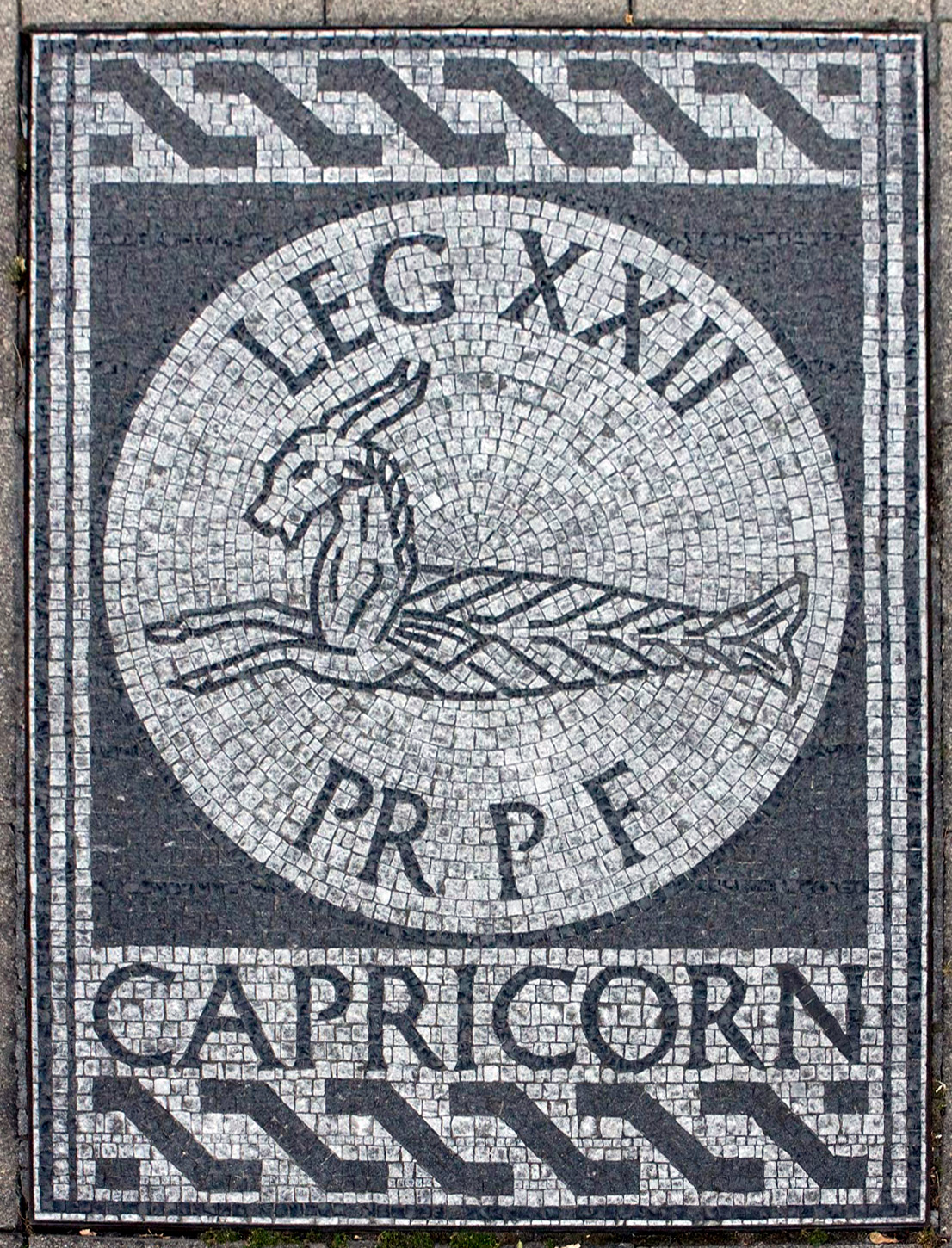
Emblem of the Legio XXII Primigenia (historicising modern floor mosaic, Kästrich Mainz)

The Roman troops stationed in Mogontiacum can largely be determined from epigraphic remains such as brick stamps, tombstones (1st century only) or building inscriptions; to a lesser extent, individual Roman troop deployments are also mentioned in historiography, for example in Tacitus or in the late antique Notitia dignitatum.

A total of nine different legions were stationed in Mogontiacum during the Principate period. Between the years 9 and 17, the troop presence reached its peak with four simultaneously stationed legions and their auxiliaries with an estimated 50,000 soldiers. From the year 93, the Legio XXII Primigenia Pia Fidelis (later with the honorific names Antoniniana, Severiana and Constantiniana Victrix) was the only legion to occupy the legionary camp until the middle of the 4th century, possibly in parts until the beginning of the 5th century. The Notitia dignitatum, which is dated to the first third of the 5th century, mentions the milites Armigerie, presumably a kind of citizen militia, for the final period of Roman Mogontiacum. They were stationed within the city limits and were under the command of the Dux Mogontiacensis or a Praefectus militum armigerorum Mogontiaco.

In addition to the legions, auxiliary troops were also stationed in Mainz. Until the beginning of the 5th century, 13 different alae and twelve cohorts are attested. From the second half of the 2nd century, an additional four different numeri are known for being stationed in Mogontiacum.

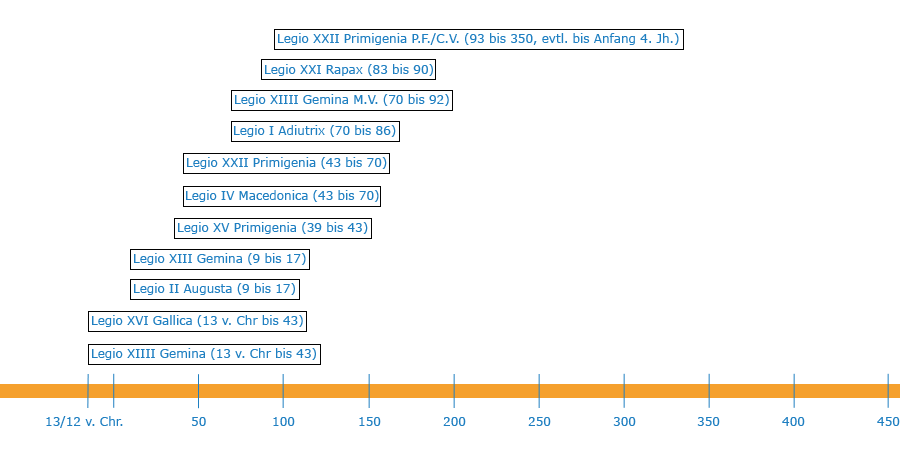
Stationing of the Roman legions in Mogontiacum - Overview

=== Base of the Rhine fleet ===
Shortly after the foundation of the legionary camp and the beginning of the civilian settlement of today's urban area, several harbour facilities were built on the banks of the Rhine. Historical sources and archaeological finds alike prove the great importance of Mogontiacum as a military and civilian port city on the Rhine.

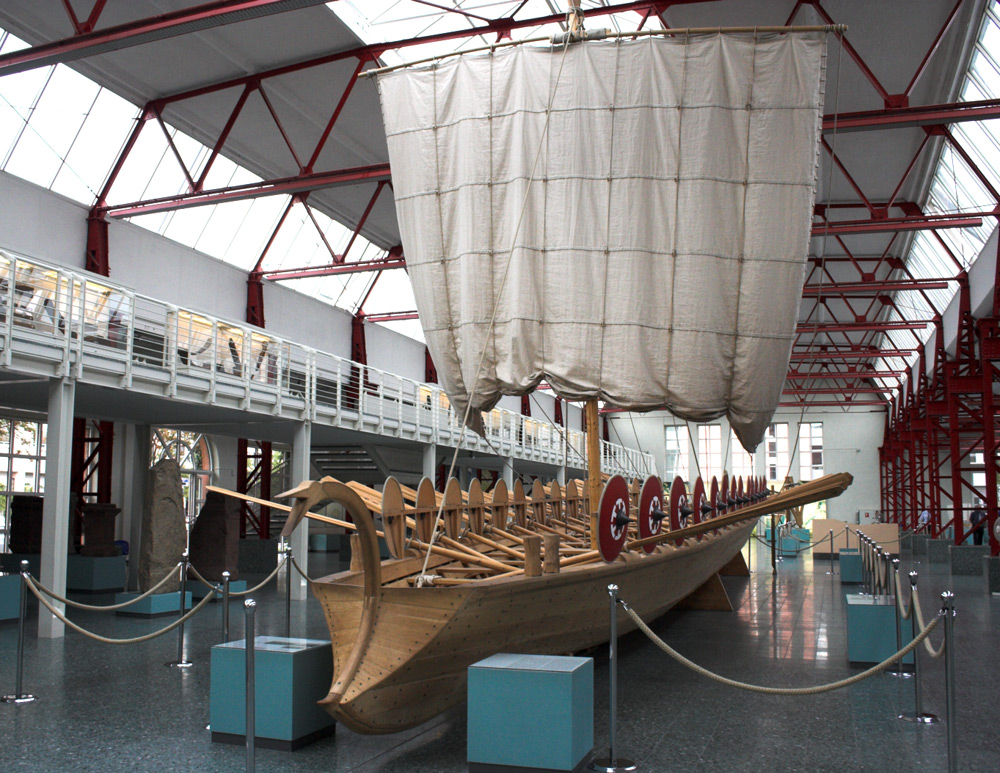
Navis lusoria - Reconstruction based on the Roman ship finds from Mainz. Museum of Ancient Seafaring, Mainz

The first archaeological finds of military port facilities from the mid-19th century were made as part of the expansion of the banks of the Rhine and the development of Mainz's new town. In addition to numerous civilian artefacts, pieces of military equipment were also found at the "Dimesser Ort", near today's customs and inland port. Remains of a solidly built pier made of cast concrete and building remains further down the Rhine, which could possibly be attributed to a Roman burgus, were also found. Similar structures from a later period have been interpreted elsewhere as river war harbours. In addition, the river basin protected by a massive mole and a burgus standing further away in the middle of the Rhine on the Ingelheimer Aue could be compared to the known main harbour of the Roman Rhine fleet in Cologne-Alteburg as a military harbour area.

A second Roman military harbour was located upstream on the Rhine at Brand (near Mainz town hall, old town). Due to the structural remains discovered there and the Roman military ships found in 1980/1981, including those of the Navis lusoria type, the identification as a military harbour has been clearly established. Here, too, ship basins separated from the Rhine in several construction phases were localised, which followed the eastward shift of the Rhine bank. The main use of this war harbour was in the second half of the 3rd century and in the 4th century, when the Rhine once again became the border of the province of Germania superior/Germania prima. Warships patrolled the Rhine from Mogontiacum from this time until the early 5th century, when the Roman Rhine fleet was disbanded following the Germanic invasion of 406/407.

Even further up the Rhine, the remains of bank defences and a shipyard from the years 5 to 9 were found at Neutorstraße/Dagobertstraße, which was most likely used for military purposes at this time. Inscriptions also name members (signifer/flag bearers) of the 22nd legion as overseers of navalia-named ship houses and mention a separate navalia neighbourhood.

== Civilian Roman Mainz ==
From its foundation in the 2nd decade BCE until the middle of the 4th century, Mogontiacum was primarily one of the largest and most important military bases on the Rhine. This led to a clear military dominance of the civilian settlements that developed around the legionary camp and the second military camp in Weisenau. Nevertheless, in the 2nd and 3rd centuries, an increasingly urbanised infrastructure developed between the legionary camp and the Rhine bridge as individual vici grew together and, at the latest after the first city wall was built in the middle of the 3rd century, a Roman civilian settlement with a metropolitan character.

=== Legal status of the city in the Roman Empire ===
Despite the development of urban structures, including large buildings and its function as provincial capital from the year 90, Mogontiacum did not have an official city title such as colonia, municipium or civitas. The civilian settlement still had the status of a canabae legionis and was therefore not a city in the legal sense. It was under the jurisdiction of the legionary legate or governor. The inhabitants of Mogontiacum also referred to themselves as canabarii in the foundation inscription on the Mainz Jupiter Column. The same apparently also applied to the civilian settlements near the legionary camps in Bonn, Strasbourg and Regensburg.

The first mention of Mogontiacum as a civitas dates back to the years of the first tetrarchy (after 293 to 305), at a time when these differentiations in city titles had already been more or less abolished by Caracalla's general grant of citizenship (Constitutio Antoniniana in 212). Under Diocletian, Mogontiacum is mentioned as a metropolis in the province of Germania prima. Ammianus Marcellinus referred to Mogontiacum as municipium Mogontiacum in 355.

=== Provincial capital Mogontiacum of the province of Germania superior ===
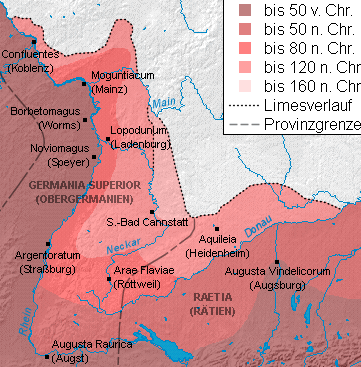
Roman expansion in southwest Germany

After Tiberius renounced the permanent occupation of Magna Germania with the desired Elbe border, the organisation of the areas on the left bank of the Rhine remained in a provisional administrative stage. The administrative district of the Upper Germanic army (exercitus superior) was merged with the administrative centre of Mogontiacum. The administration, and in particular the financial administration, was subject to the administration of the province of Gallia Belgica.

Under Domitian, both a larger and permanent territorial expansion to the right bank of the Rhine (Agri decumates) and the establishment of a new province, Germania superior, took place. It belonged to the imperial provinces and, with an area of 93,500 square kilometres, was one of the medium-sized provinces of the Roman Empire. The existing civilian settlement of Mogontiacum was simultaneously elevated to provincial capital without any change in its legal status. The previous military commander of the Upper Germanic army group (legatus Augusti pro praetore), who was also responsible for civil administration, became the consular governor of the newly founded province, to whom the troops stationed there continued to report as usual.

When the Roman provinces were reorganised under Diocletian after 297, the much smaller province of Germania prima emerged from Germania superior. Mogontiacum remained the seat of the governor, as shown by a mention of Mogontiacum as a metropolis in the Notitia Galliarum. The post of dux Mogontiacensis, newly created during Diocletian's reign as military commander of all troops on the Upper Rhine, also had its seat in Mogontiacum.

=== Camp village and civilian settlement ===
City districts of Mogontiacum

Individual districts of Mogontiacum are known for the 2nd and 3rd centuries

Designation	Remark
Vicus Apollinensis	–
Vicus Vobergensis	–
Vicus Salutaris	–
Vicus Navaliorum	Possibly the civilian settlement on the southern harbour on the Rhine
Vicus Novus	–
Vicus Vic[toriae]	Possibly the civilian settlement in Mainz-Weisenau

At the same time as the legionary camp was established on the Kästrich, two canabae were built on the neighbouring plateau to the south and southwest of the camp, initially separately. In contrast to the civilian settlement areas, these were semi-military in character. In the Flavian period, as in the civilian vici, the canabae were extensively developed in stone. Both canabae also grew in the 2nd century and largely merged into one settlement, separated only by the aqueduct at the south-western corner of the camp. When the camp wall was rebuilt in the middle of the 3rd century after the fall of the Limes, the canabae were also surrounded by a protective wall. When the legionary camp was abandoned a century later and after the destruction of the following years by the Chatti and Alamanni, the canabae were also abandoned. There is archaeological evidence of cellar pits and a rectangular road system as well as civilian burials in nearby burial grounds.

Shortly afterwards, individual, separate vici developed at the foot of the legionary camp. The earliest archaeological evidence of a civilian settlement dating back to Augustan times can be found directly in front of the Porta praetoria (today's Emmerich-Josef-Straße). Along the Roman road running from there to the Rhine crossing (today Emmeransstraße), this vicus slowly expanded in the direction of today's Schillerplatz and the Flachsmarkt. At Flachsmarkt, a second main road coming from the military camp in Weisenau met up with the first-mentioned road. Other civilian settlements established immediately after the beginning of the Roman presence were located in front of the military camp in Weisenau and at Dimesser Ort. The latter vicus is considered the most important civilian settlement and the centre of civilian life in Mogontiacum in the first century CE. As a presumed settlement of long-distance merchants, the canabarii appear to have quickly achieved a certain prosperity, which was linked to the desire for legal recognition of the civil settlement. The foundation of the Great Column of Jupiter in Mainz in the first third of the 1st century has been interpreted in various ways as an attempt by the civilian population to speed up the legal recognition of the settlement.

With the reconstruction of the destroyed civilian settlement areas after the Revolt of the Batavi and the expansion of the infrastructure in the following period, the individual vici slowly merged into a coherent, urbanised settlement area. In addition, during the time of the Flavian emperors and even more so from the 2nd century onwards, there is evidence of a shift in settlement towards the present-day city centre for the Weisenau vicus and the vicus at Dimesser Ort. The civilian settlement, now centrally located below the legionary camp, extended from the foot of the Kästrich to the Rhine. As there was no coherent building plan, the street network that has been identified to date was not laid out regularly. The central areas of the city centre were probably the Flachsmarkt, where the forum is sometimes assumed to have been located, the Schillerplatz as a flood-protected settlement area and today's cathedral area, where the central place of worship is assumed to have been located.

After the construction of the second city wall in the middle of the 4th century, the city area covered 98.5 hectares. A large thermal building in the immediate vicinity of today's State Theatre from the first half of the 1st century is known to have been part of the civilian settlement. A larger administrative building stood in the immediate vicinity of today's municipal retirement home. During construction work in the 1970s, extensive architectural remains, a marble fountain with a bronze fish figure as a waterspout and bricks with the stamps of the Mainz legions were found. The governor's palace is thought to have stood here, which could have been as prestigious as its Cologne counterpart above the banks of the Rhine. Luxurious city villas were uncovered in the area of Schillerstraße at today's Proviant-Magazin and in the old town (Badergasse), some of which were decorated with mosaics.

There is no record or estimate of the population of Mogontiacum. The somewhat smaller civilian Colonia Claudia Ara Agrippinensium had around 30,000 inhabitants around the year 50. Only the size of the stage theatre, which could accommodate around 10,000 spectators, and the general development of the city allow certain conclusions to be drawn about a possible civilian population, which may have been in the lower five-digit range.

The topography of the civilian Mogontiacum is insufficiently archaeologically explored and, compared to other important Roman towns in Germany, has been scarcely researched. There are various reasons for this. From the early Middle Ages onwards, the high-quality Roman building materials were continuously reused for the expanding city. There were also repeated instances of deliberate destruction of Roman remains. For example, the stage building at the theatre during the construction of the railway at the end of the 19th century or the Mithraeum at Ballplatz on Ballplatz, which was demolished in 1976 despite protests from the population. In general, the Roman settlement area in today's urban area was intensively built over from the Middle Ages onwards.

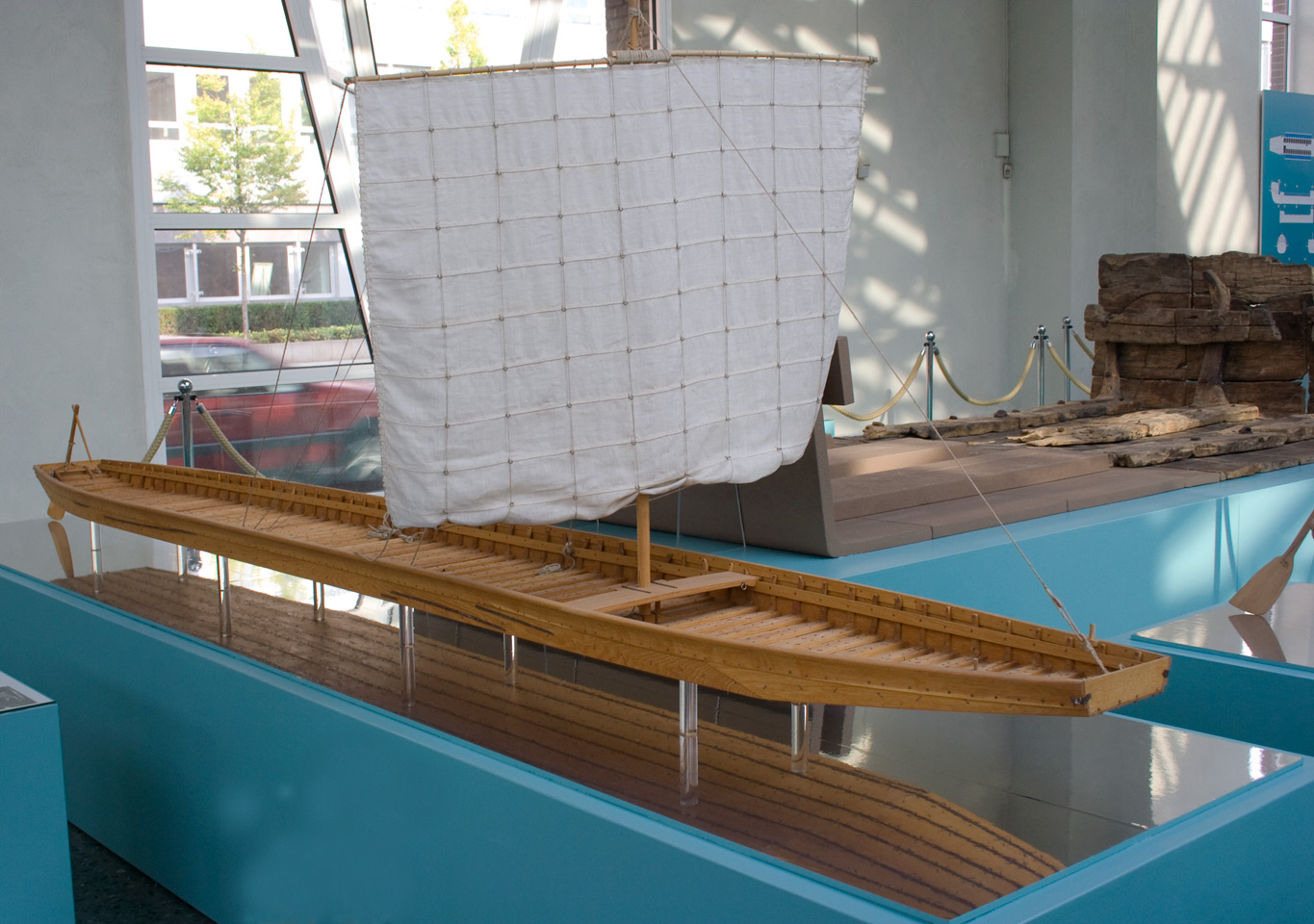
Model and original artefact of a Roman barge (1st century, Forchheim: Mainz). Museum for Ancient Seafaring, Mainz

=== Civilian inland ports ===
The aforementioned Dimesser Ort was not only most likely a harbour used for military purposes, but also appears to have been the long-distance trading port of Gallic-Italian merchants. This is indicated by a high find density of transport amphorae of Mediterranean origin as well as other import finds from Gaul and the Mediterranean region. The structural finds such as stone paving (possibly a loading ramp for flat-bottomed ships) and quays support this assumption. In connection with the trading activities, a prosperous civilian settlement also developed at the Dimesser Ort, which must have been the civilian centre of Mogontiacum as early as the middle of the 1st century.

Other civilian harbours or landing sites with less elaborate quays and cargo houses have also been found upstream on the Rhine near the old town of Mainz (Dagobertstraße, Kappelhof, where two Roman prams from the 1st century were found). The local Celto-Roman Rhine boatmen and traders are likely to have been active here, whose existence is well documented by the tombstone of the shipowner and trader Blussus (dated to around the year 50), for example. Raft shipping was also very important in the Roman period and was probably the most important means of transporting timber on the Rhine to Mogontiacum.

=== Stage theatre ===
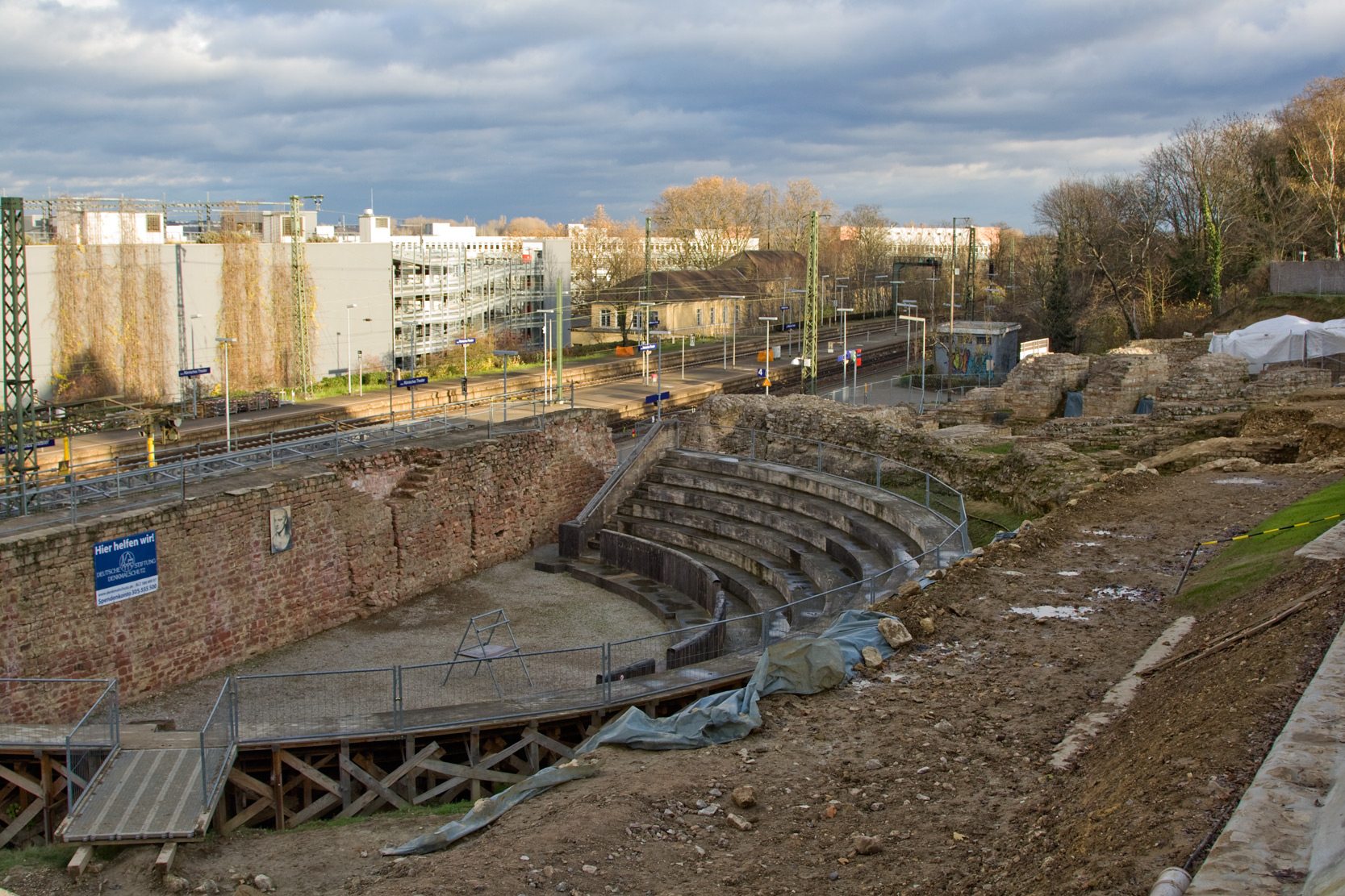
Partial view of the Roman stage theatre in Mainz from the 2nd century

The writer Suetonius mentions a stage theatre in Mogontiacum as early as the year 39. The remains of the theatre visible and uncovered today date from the 2nd century and probably followed an earlier theatre built using wood and earth technology. With a stage length of 41.25 m and a diameter of 116.25 m, it is the largest Roman stage theatre north of the Alps. It could seat over 10,000 spectators. The stage theatre, which stood in the immediate vicinity of the Drusus Stone south of the legionary camp, was most likely used for cult celebrations for Drusus in addition to the regular theatre business, which could explain the relatively large extension.

The theatre was in use until the 4th century, but was located outside the protected city area after the second city wall was built which reduced the size of the city area. Spolia from the theatre area were used for the construction of this second city wall. The massive cast masonry vault was used as an early Christian burial site from the 6th century onwards. There were still visible ruins of the theatre above ground in the early Middle Ages, which were mentioned in written documents. The last remains of the theatre visible above ground were levelled in the middle of the 17th century when the citadel was extended.

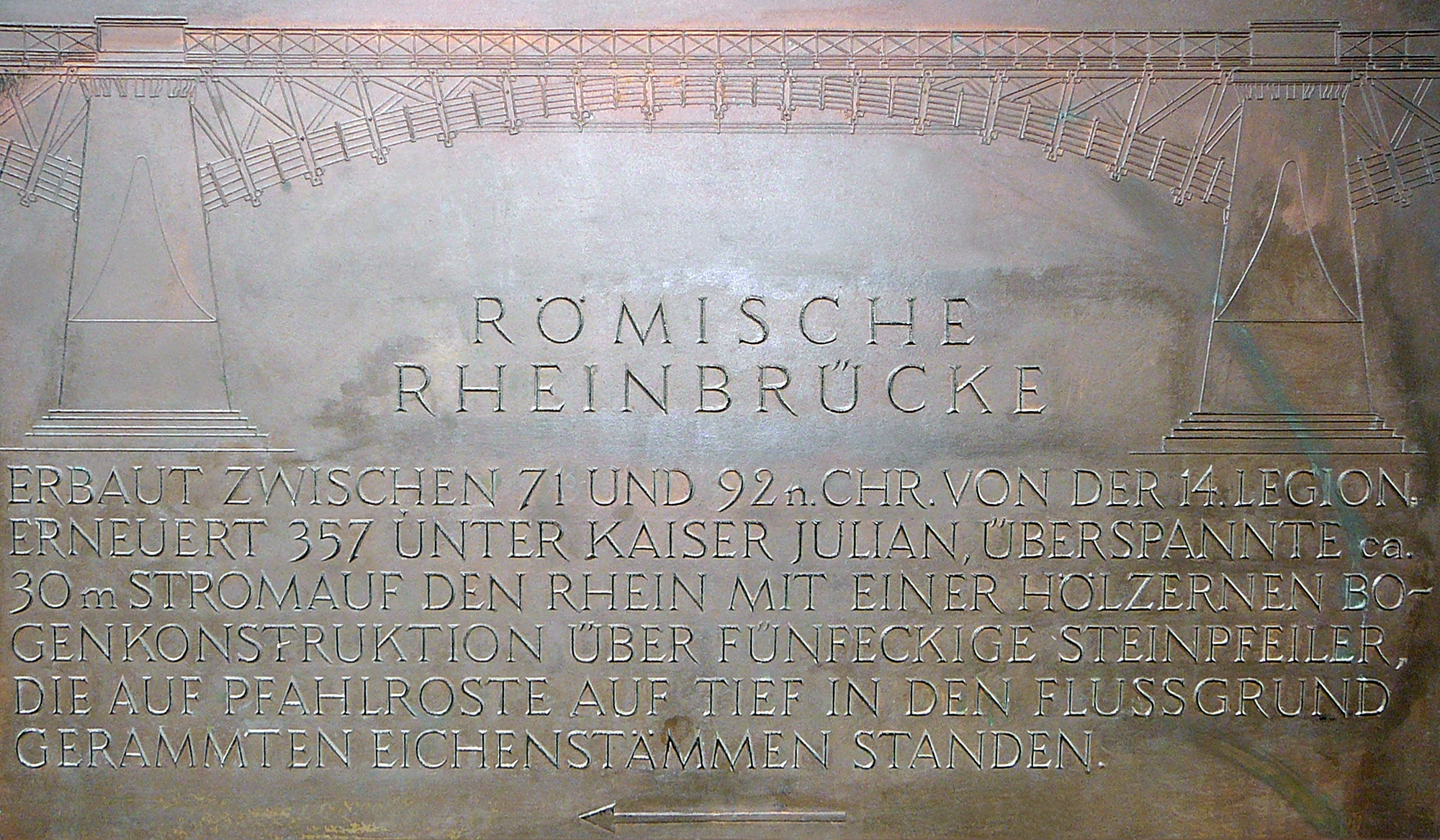
Modern bridge panel of the Roman bridge, which is being reconstructed as a timber supporting structure with segmental arches

=== Roman Rhine bridge ===
Shortly after the founding of the camp under Drusus, but at the latest before his campaign from Mogontiacum in 10 BCE, there was probably already a floating bridge (pons navalis) to the right bank of the Rhine. From the year 27 and thus in the Tiberian period, the first solid wooden bridge construction is dendrochronologically proven. This was most probably a pile-yoke bridge. Under Domitian, a fixed bridge was built at the beginning of the 80s, which crossed the Rhine around 30 metres above today's Theodor Heuss Bridge. The 420 m long bridge had at least 21 stone piers, 14 of which have been archaeologically proven in the riverbed, each of which rested on elaborately placed pile grids. The wooden bridge superstructure, which supported a 12 m wide multi-lane carriageway, lay on the stone piers. A construction inscription on the bridge ramp on the left bank of the Rhine dates back to Legio XIIII Gemina, which was stationed in Mogontiacum between 70 and 92. The Rhine bridge was renewed and repaired several times, for example in the years 100, 157, 213 and in the following decades. It is assumed that it was still or again in use at the beginning of the 5th century and that the Rhine crossing of the Germanic invasion in 406 took place over it. A schematic illustration of the pile-grate bridge can be found on the Lyon lead medallion from around 300.

The bridge had an evenly curved carriageway due to different pier spacing, so that the greatest possible clearance for Rhine ships was available in the centre of the river. On the right bank of the Rhine, the bridge carriageway led directly into the Castellum Mattiacorum, so the bridge was also militarily secured.

There is also evidence of a smaller bridge over the Main, which was located slightly above the mouth of the Main. There may also have been a second Rhine crossing in the form of a ship's bridge or a permanent ferry crossing. This could have been located below the auxiliary camp in Mainz-Weisenau, but has not yet been clearly verified by research.

=== Aqueduct ===
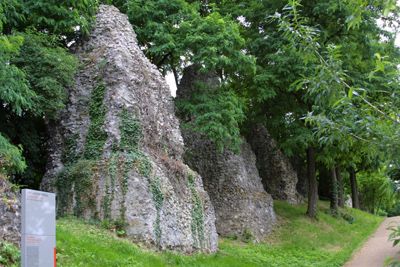
Remains of the pillars of the Roman aqueduct from the 1st century. Location: Mainz (Zahlbachtal)

To supply the legionary camp on the Kästrich and later also the civilian settlement, an elaborate water pipeline, partly constructed as an aqueduct, was built as early as the 1st century. The water supply to the camp via wells in the inner camp area was not possible due to the groundwater level lying at a depth of over 20 metres. Transporting water from the neighbouring Zahlbach valley for the camp, which was initially occupied by at least two legions, was also not feasible in the long term.

It is therefore likely that a wooden aqueduct was already in place from the first half of the 1st century, which supplied the camp with fresh water. The areas of today's Mainz districts of Drais and especially Finthen, which have numerous springs, could be localised as the starting points of this aqueduct. To date, however, there is no reliable evidence of a wooden predecessor building.

As part of the large-scale construction measures of the Flavian emperors, an aqueduct was built in stone, probably at the same time as the expansion of the legionary camp. The Mainz legions Legio XIIII Gemina and Legio I Adiutrix were involved in the construction, as shown by brick stamps that allow a relatively precise chronological classification of this building project. The aqueduct ran from the springs in Finthen, initially underground and later in a channel, to the head station at the south-west corner of the camp. The aqueduct was almost nine kilometres long in total. The last three kilometres were constructed as an aqueduct and crossed the Zahlbach valley on arches of over 25 metres, probably two storeys high. The centre distance was around 8.50 m and the average gradient over the entire length of the pipeline was 0.9%. Calculations showed a daily water volume of several 100 m³ of fresh water, which was distributed via lead pressurised water pipes in the warehouse and also in the canabae.

The massive cast wall cores of the pillars can still be seen along a stretch of around 600 metres in the Zahlbach Valley. Some of the pillar stumps, known as "Roman stones", still rise up several metres, but have been almost completely stripped of their former cladding.

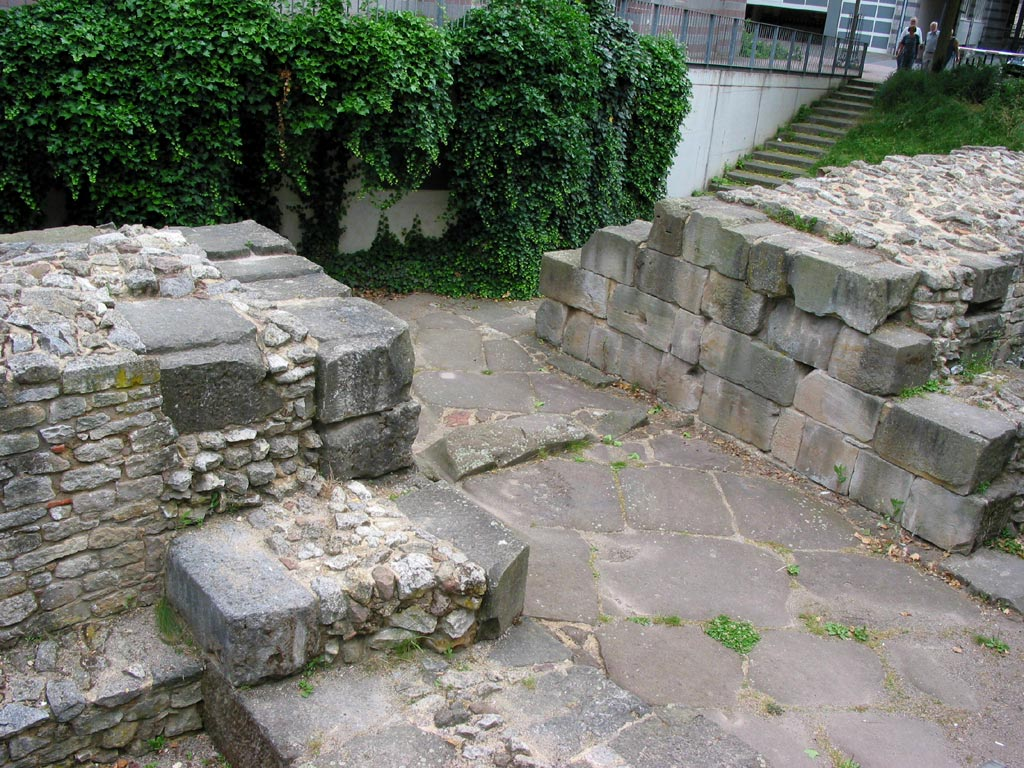
Roman city gate and parts of the city wall from the 4th century. Location: Mainz (Kästrich)

=== City wall and city gate ===
Shortly after the middle of the 3rd century (the section of wall running parallel to the Rhine could be dated to the period 251/253 through the examination of wooden pile grates), the civilian settlement located between the legionary camp and the Rhine was surrounded by a city wall for the first time. The city wall adjoined the fortifications of the legionary camp to the south-west over a length of 600 metres, although it remained independent. It had rectangular, slightly protruding towers and a moat. It was 2 to 2.50 metres wide and 6 metres high up to the lower edge of the parapet walk. In total, the wall, which was at least 5.1 kilometres long, enclosed around 150 hectares, making it one of the largest city fortifications north of the Alps in Roman times. The canabae legionis to the south-west of the legionary camp were also fortified, while the civilian settlements at Dimesser Ort and Weisenau lay outside the fortified city area and thus lost further importance. At the same time, the stone wall of the legionary camp was also renewed, now for the third time since the construction of the first stone camp wall under the Flavian emperor.

After Julian's victory over the Alemanni in 357, the construction of a second, shortened city wall was begun in the period 360-370, probably during his reign. At the same time, the legionary camp was abandoned after more than 350 years and the resulting gap in the fortification was closed by a newly built section of wall in this area. Spolia from the demolished large buildings of the legionary camp were used for this purpose, which were utilised here in large numbers. The demolition of this section of wall between 1899 and 1911 resulted in a large number of high-quality architectural elements, which, among other things, allowed a reasonably reliable reconstruction of the praetorium and other large buildings of the legionary camp and the Dativius-Victor Arch. With the construction of the second city wall, a city area of around 118 hectares was now enclosed, reducing the defences by around a third compared to the phase of the first city wall.

During construction work on the Kästrich in 1985, remains of the walls of this second city wall, a Roman city gate and the paving of the road leading through it were discovered. The city gate was integrated into the 2.70 metre wide city wall and the via praetoria, which originated from the legionary camp and was a strategically important road leading down to the civilian settlement, passed through it. At a width of 1.90 metres, the ground-in lanes on the gate threshold and the well-preserved sandstone pavement show the typical track width of Roman vehicles. The city gate was closed with a double-leaf wooden gate and also had a gate tower. The entire gate complex is therefore of the "Andernach" type and is one of the latest gate complexes known and preserved in Roman Germany.

=== Monuments ===
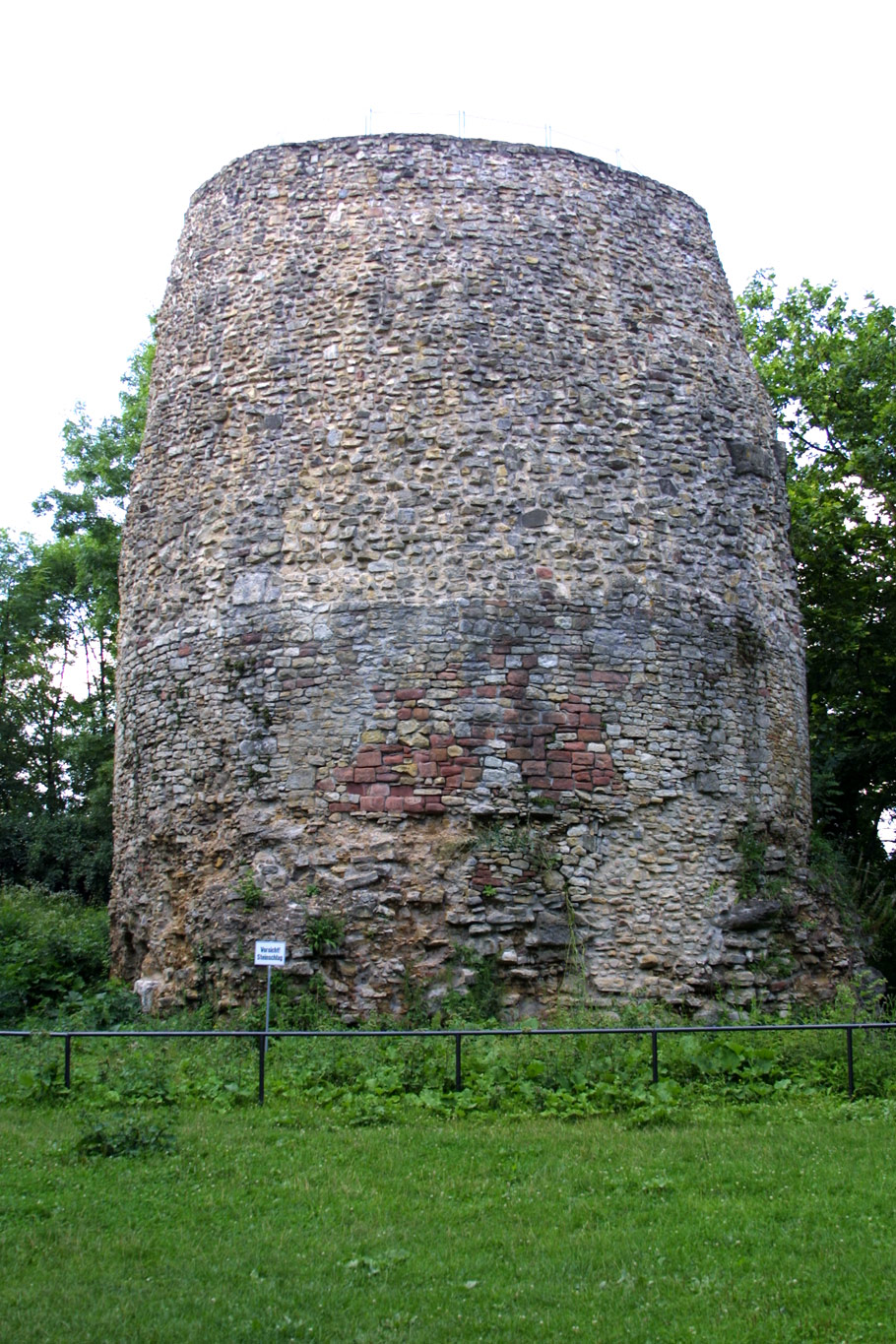
Drususstein, cenotaph of Drusus from the early 1st century. Location: Mainz Citadel

The only and most important monument from the time of Mogontiacum still standing at its original location is the so-called Drususstein. In the meantime, scholars have come to the conclusion that this is likely to be the cenotaph (tumulus honorarius) of the Roman general Drusus. This was erected by the Roman army in Mogontiacum in honour of the general who died of a fatal injury in Germania in 9 BC. The monument was later approved by Augustus, who honoured it with a specially written funeral poem. Roman historians such as Suetonius and Eutropius also explicitly mention the Drusus Stone and the cult ceremonial in memory of Drusus.

The monument also became the focus of annual cult and commemoration ceremonies (supplicatio) in honour of Drusus, which were attended by delegates from the provincial councils of the three Gallic provinces (concilium Galliarum). The Roman legions from Mogontiacum honoured their former commander with parades (decursio militum). The nearby theatre with its more than 10,000 seats was probably also involved in these celebrations.

The remains of the cenotaph that are still visible today are an almost 20-metre-high stone structure made of solid cast masonry with cast stones built into it. The original height was probably 30 metres (equivalent to 100 Roman feet). Reconstructions assume a square base and a cylindrical storey (tambour), on which sat a conical top crowned by a pine cone. Similar tombs from the early imperial period can also be found on Roman burial roads in Italy.

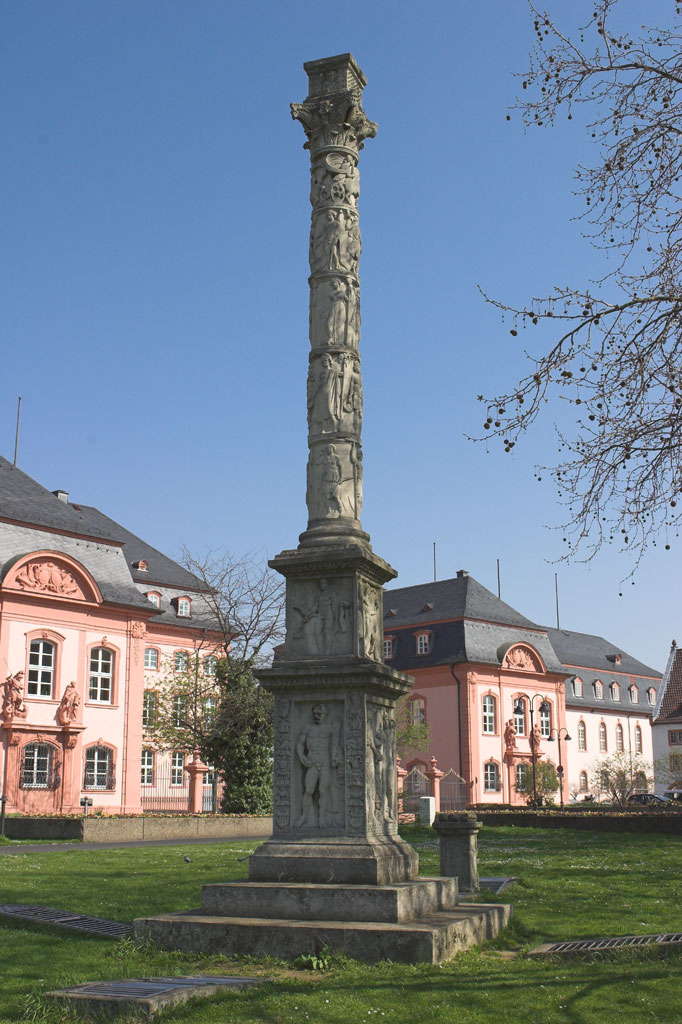
Large Jupiter Column in Mainz. Faithful reconstruction in front of the Mainz State Parliament, original in the Mainz State Museum

The Great Jupiter Column of Mainz is a monument erected in Mogontiacum in the second half of the 1st century in honour of the Roman god Jupiter. It is not only the earliest datable monument of its kind, but also the largest and most elaborate Jupiter column in the German-speaking world. The Mainz Jupiter Column was the model for subsequent Jupiter (giant) columns that were erected in the Germanic provinces, particularly in the 2nd and 3rd centuries. The 9.14 metre high, richly sculpted column was crowned by a 3.36 metre high Jupiter figure with an eagle made of gilded bronze. The surviving donor inscription is connected with a declaration of loyalty to Emperor Nero and identifies the canabarii, in this case the inhabitants of the civilian settlement of Dimesser Ort on the banks of the Rhine, as the donors. The column, made up of over 2000 individual fragments, is now in the Landesmuseum Mainz, and only a few remains of the bronze figure have survived. A faithful replica of the Great Mainz Jupiter Column now stands in front of the Rhineland-Palatinate State Parliament in Mainz.

Another important monument from the middle of the 3rd century is the Arch of Dativius Victor. In Roman Mogontiacum, this arch served as the centre passage of a portico of a public building, possibly near the legionary camp. A large part of the arch (43 of a total of 75 individual sandstone blocks) was discovered as spolia between 1898 and 1911 during the demolition of the medieval city wall in the lower, late Roman foundation area. This arch is also decorated with lavish reliefs, including a partially preserved zodiac, vines and Jupiter/Juno. The fully preserved inscription names Dativius Victor, decurio of the civitas Taunensium (councillor of the Taunensian local authority in Nida) as the founder. He may have settled in Mogontiacum as a result of the increasing unrest caused by the Alemanni invasions that began in 233 and donated the arch out of gratitude. Like the Mainz Jupiter Column, the original is located in the stone hall of the Mainz State Museum, while a replica can be found in the immediate vicinity of the Electoral Palace and the Roman-Germanic Central Museum.

In 1986, the foundations of a large three-tower structure were found in Mainz-Kastel, which may have been an arch of honour. It is possible that these are the remains of the arch of honour for Germanicus, the son of Drusus, mentioned in Tacitus, the Tabula Siarensis and the Tabula Hebana. Mention is made of the erection of three arches of honour for Germanicus after his death in the year 19, one of which stood in Mogontiacum apud ripam Rheni. However, the chronological and personal attribution of the foundations found is disputed. The presumed arch of honour could also have been erected by Domitian during his Chatti Wars.

=== Shrines and places of worship ===
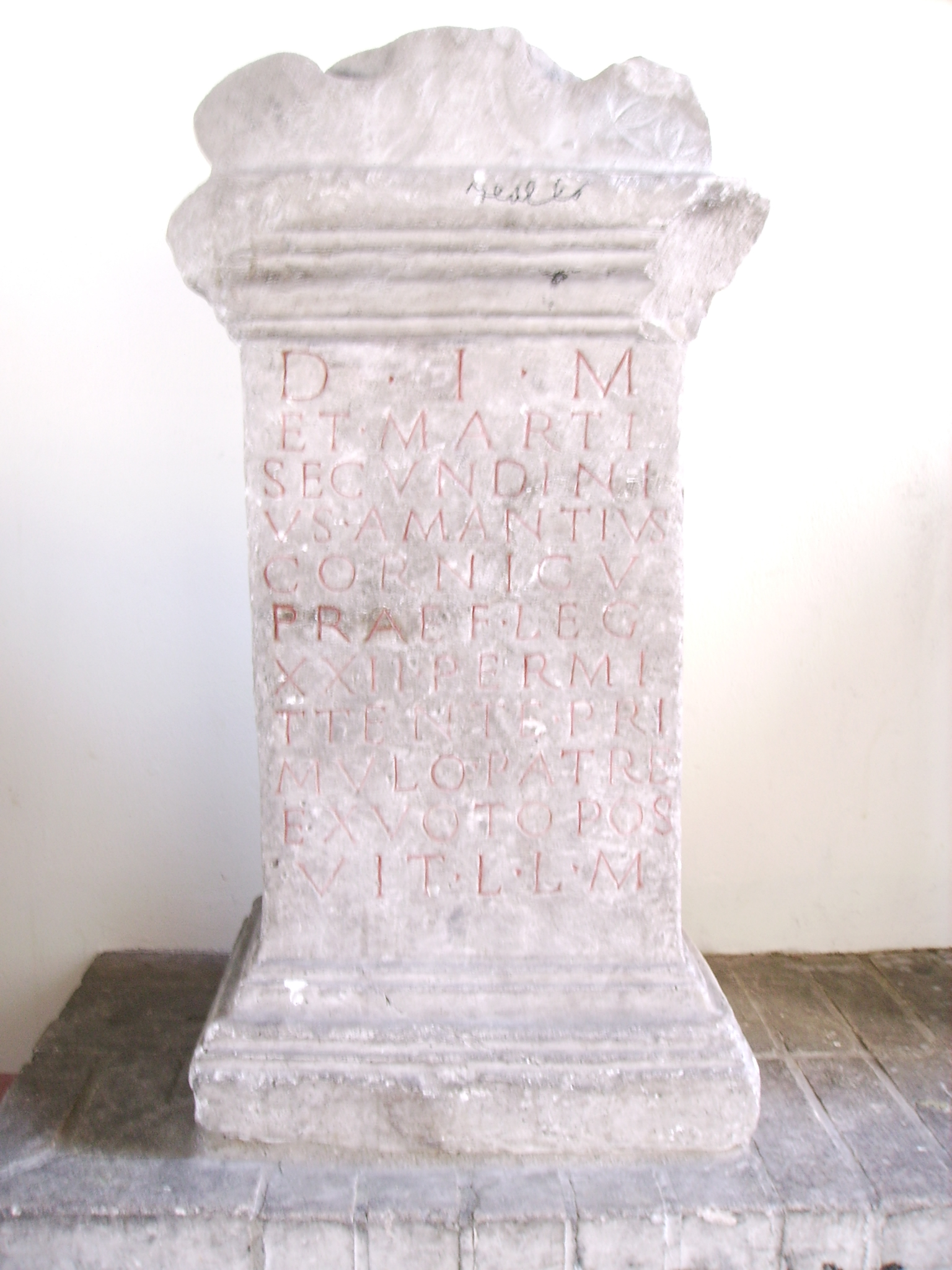
Consecration altar of Mithras made of Odenwald marble, Ballplatz site

Mogontiacum was the centre of religious and cultic life in the surrounding area. Due to the character of the city, this was a clearly militarised practice. The imperial cult in the complex around the Drusus Stone, starting with the cult and commemorative celebrations in honour of Drusus and his son Germanicus, played a major and central role in the early days of Mogontiacum. Later, the religious and cultic life appropriate to a provincial capital developed, which also spread to the surrounding area. On the part of the Celtic-Roman population, the worship of local, relatively quickly Romanised Celtic deities flowed in.

Nine cult sites from Mainz and the surrounding area have so far been archaeologically discovered or can be assumed on the basis of archaeological evidence. A further nine cult sites are only attested epigraphically. On the other hand, Mogontiacum has the largest number of consecration monuments of the Gallic and Germanic provinces, including 272 consecration inscriptions alone. However, the majority of these were found as spolia from the wall base of the late antique-medieval city wall and therefore do not allow any conclusions to be drawn about the geographical location of the sanctuaries. Cult sites of Jupiter, Juno and Minerva and perhaps also Apollo may have been located in the area of today's cathedral district, but there is no direct archaeological evidence for this. Whether Mogontiacum, like Trier or Cologne, had a sanctuary of the "Capitoline Triad" is questionable due to the lack of an official city character. Numerous dedication stones, exclusively from legionary legates, point to a sanctuary of Apollo and another unknown deity in the 3rd century in the immediate vicinity of the Rhine bridge. Epigraphically confirmed are a sanctuary of Bellona in Castellum and a sacellum of Mercury between Mainz and Mainz-Hechtsheim. Sanctuaries of the Genius Loci, Bonus Eventus and Fortuna Conservatrix have also only been identified epigraphically, but could not be localised.

A more precise localisation is possible for other sanctuaries and cult sites. As early as 1976, a Mithraeum was excavated at the Ballplatz and thus at the foot of the Kästrich with its legionary camp, but it was destroyed in the course of further construction work. What is unusual here is the very early worship of Mithras, which was dated by pottery finds to the period between 70 and 80 and thus to the Flavian period. With a total length of 30 metres, it is the oldest and largest known Mithraeum in the Roman Empire. The date of construction, size and furnishings indicate that the sanctuary was held in high esteem and played a major role in the spread of the cult in the two Germanic provinces.

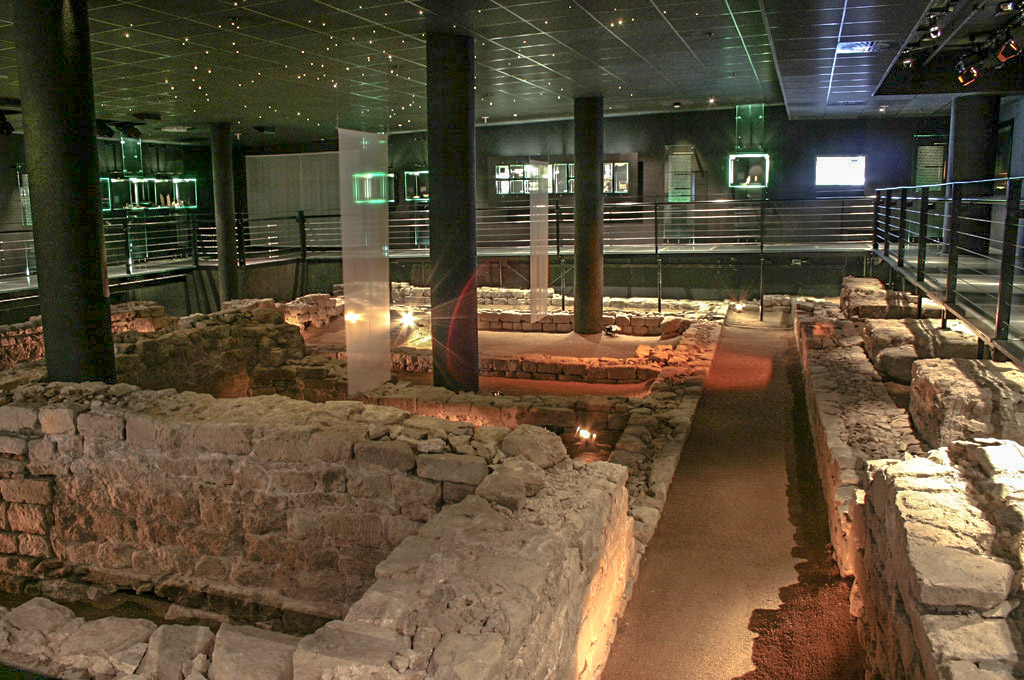
Sanctuary of Isis and Mater Magna, Mainz

The joint cult complex of Isis and Mater Magna, however, which was discovered in 1999, was excavated under archaeological supervision, conserved and presented to visitors as a museum together with some of the rich finds from religious and cultic life. As with the Mithraeum, the early dating of the sanctuary to the Flavian period, or more precisely to the time of Vespasian, is surprising. Until the discovery, it was not known that the cult of Isis had penetrated the northern provinces of the Roman Empire so early. Scholars assume that the reason for the early establishment of this oriental cult (as well as the above-mentioned cult of Mithras) was the massive military presence in Mogontiacum.

The many individual finds provide detailed information about the official cult practices in honour of Isis and Mater Magna in Mogontiacum. Other outstanding epigraphic evidence includes the large number of lead curse tablets found, which, together with the magic dolls found, provide an insight into the magical-ritual cult world of the simple provincial Romans, which was forbidden under Roman law and practised illegally.

The sanctuaries of Mercury and Rosmerta in Finthen and Mars Leucetius and Nemetona in Klein-Winternheim, which were found outside the settlement area at the time, are not located directly in Mogontiacum, but are clearly more closely related to the settlement and military camp. The first pair of gods is thought to be a larger temple modelled on the Gallic temple from around the year 100. The life-size bronze head of a goddess found there in 1844 is generally thought to be an effigy of the Celtic goddess Rosmerta. She was often worshipped together with the Roman god Mercury or his Celtic pedant. The high-quality bronze dates to the beginning of the 2nd century and shows clear influences of the Roman style, but was probably made locally in Mainz.

The smaller sanctuary of Mars Leucetius and Nemetona was located even further outside the core settlement area and, like the sanctuary of Mercury/Rosmerta, probably dates back to an Aresacian sanctuary from pre-Roman times. A bronze votive tablet by the senator Fabricius Veiento and his wife for Nemetona from the Flavian period proves that the Celtic goddess was also worshipped in Flavian times.

In 2020, archaeologists excavating in the area of the customs harbour found a life-size, elaborately crafted but headless statue of a female figure with her foot resting on a calf's head. This 1.49 metre high figure was later identified as Salus, goddess of well-being and salvation. The cult of Salus was established in the second half of the 1st century and is associated with the period of prosperity that began in the Roman provinces on the Rhine at this time. The founders and the year of the foundation are known from the inscription on the plinth. Senecianus Moderatus and Respectus Constans were residents of the "Dimesser Ort" civilian settlement near the customs harbour and donated the statue in 231. In addition to its hoped-for healing effect for the emperor and the state, the foundation and the erection of the statue in a public space also increased the prestige of the donors and their civilian settlement.

=== Trade and crafts ===
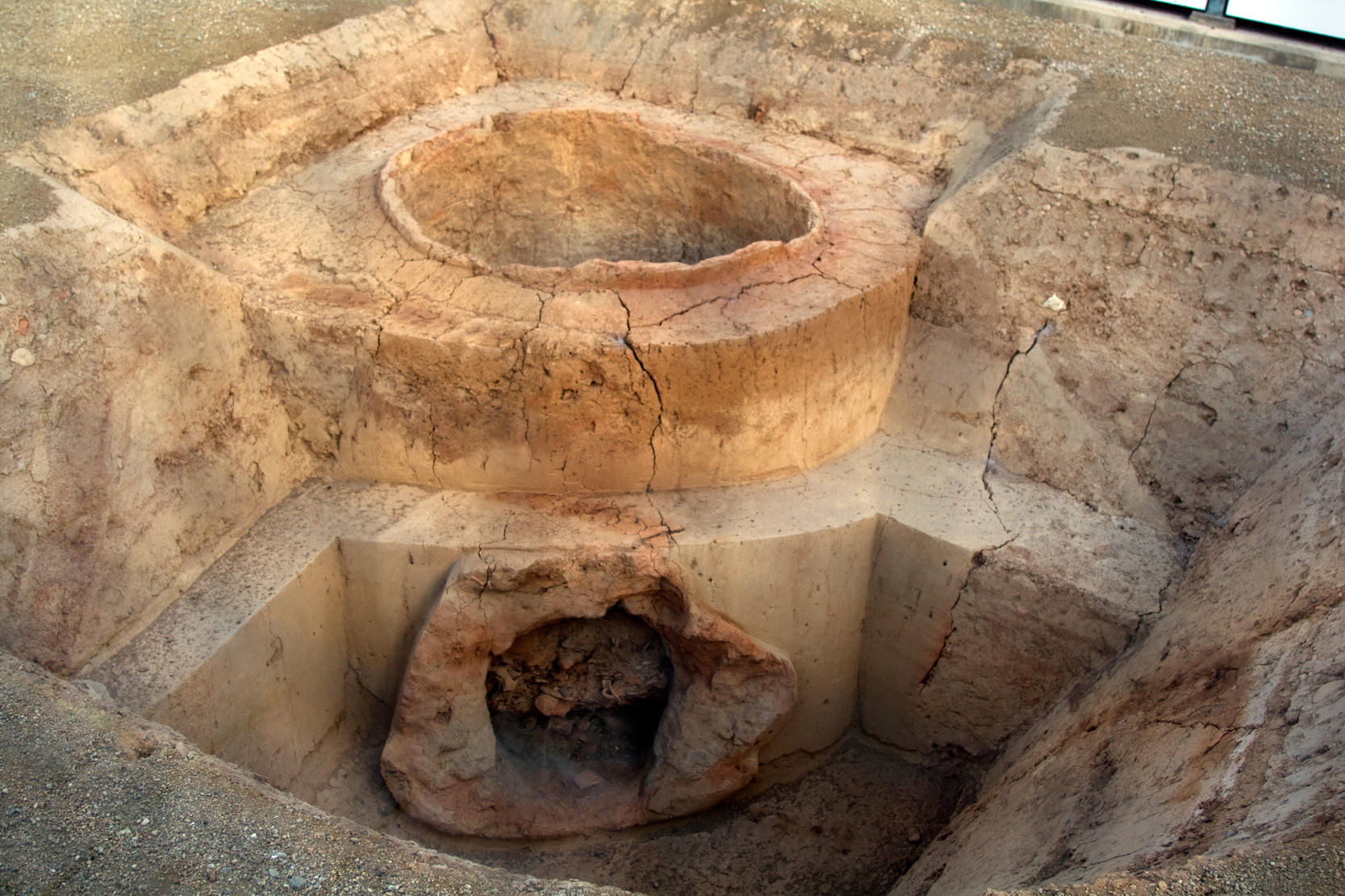
Pottery kiln from the vicus near the present-day Mainz suburb of Weisenau

The economic importance of Mogontiacum as a trading centre and production site increased rapidly after the foundation of the legionary camp. Finds from the camp canabae and the civilian vici indicate a steadily growing economic prosperity, especially from the Flavian period until the abandonment of the Limes.

In view of the number of soldiers stationed there, at times up to four legions including auxiliary troops, it can be assumed that Mogontiacum quickly became an important centre for local and long-distance trade. The location on the Middle Rhine and inland waterway transport probably also played an important role in local transport, as evidenced by finds of cargo and transport barges or the tomb of the wealthy Romano-Celtic bargeman Blussus in Mainz. The subsequently flourishing civilian settlements, in particular the civilian settlement at the "Dimesser Ort" with its Gallic-Italian long-distance merchants, also benefited from trade and the transhipment of goods via Rhine navigation.

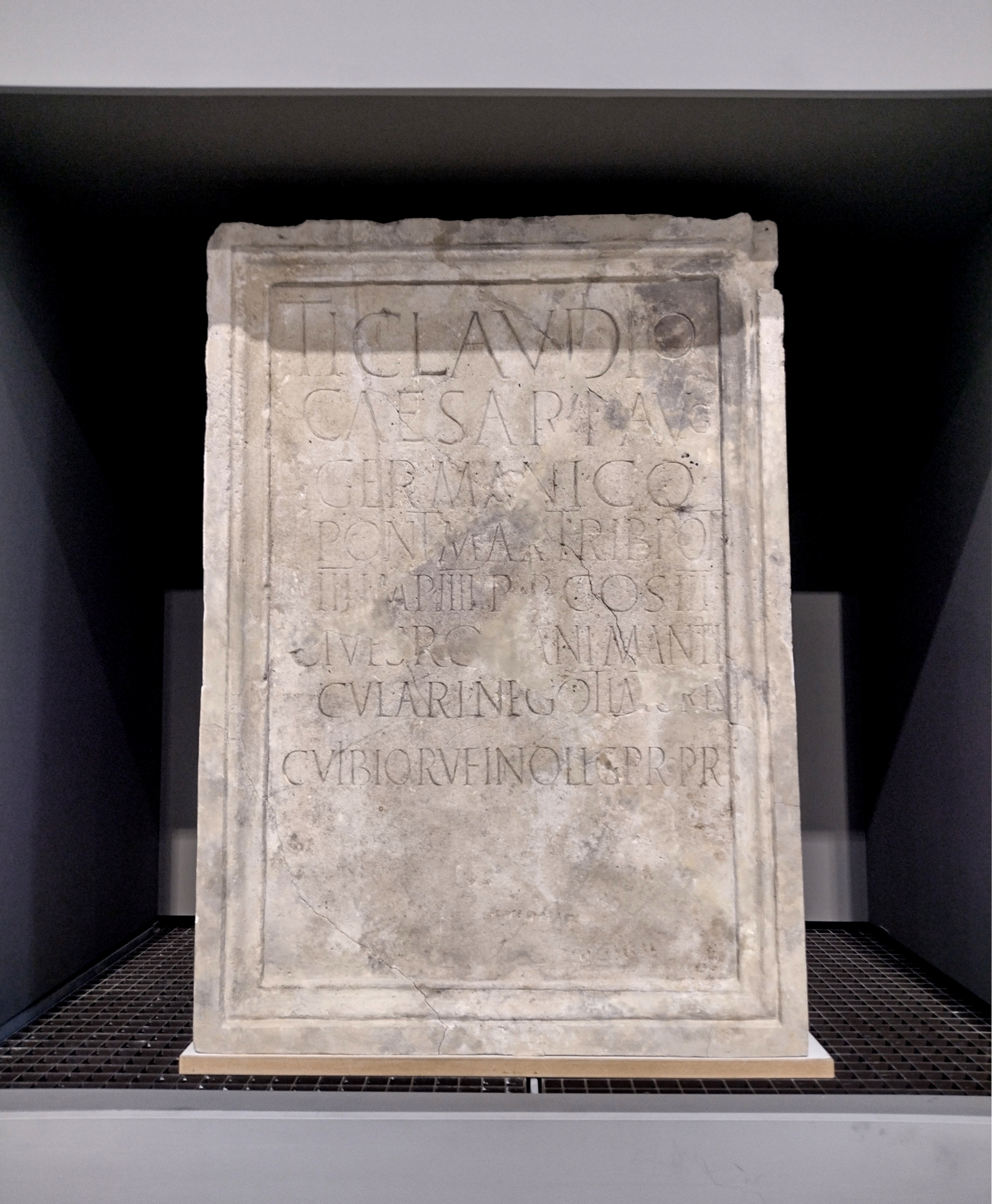
Honorary inscription for Emperor Claudius from Mainz, erected by the group of "cives Romani manticulari negotiatores" (the "merchants with Roman citizenship who trade in bags/purses"), which provides an insight into the highly specialised trade of Mogontiacum

Trade flows from the surrounding countryside now also converged in Mogontiacum. Well-developed roads led from Mogontiacum to Cologne, Trier, Worms and beyond via Alzey to Gaul. With the construction of the fixed Rhine bridge during the Flavian period, trade and the exchange of goods with settlement areas on the right bank of the Rhine also increased significantly. With the increasing settlement of military veterans in the urban area or in the surrounding area of Mogontiacum (villae rusticae have been found in all Mainz suburbs), the number of craft and agricultural businesses supplying the military and civilian population also increased. In the individual vici of Mogontiacum, entire craftsmen's quarters developed, such as a significant collection of shoemakers' workshops along the camp road down to the Rhine in the area of today's Emmeransstraße. There were also pottery workshops (for example in the area of today's government quarter), metal workshops or bone and leather processing businesses at the northern end of the settlement area as well as armouries for the soldiers stationed in Mogontiacum.

In the first decades after the foundation of the legionary camp, inland shipping, which was in the hands of the Celtic population, flourished in the civilian settlement near Weisenau. This was then increasingly superseded by a large number of pottery businesses and a veritable "pottery industry" from the Flavian period onwards, which became the main source of income for the local civilian population. There was also a Roman lamp factory there, dated between the years 20 and 69, which may have been a military operation.

=== Thermal and fort baths ===
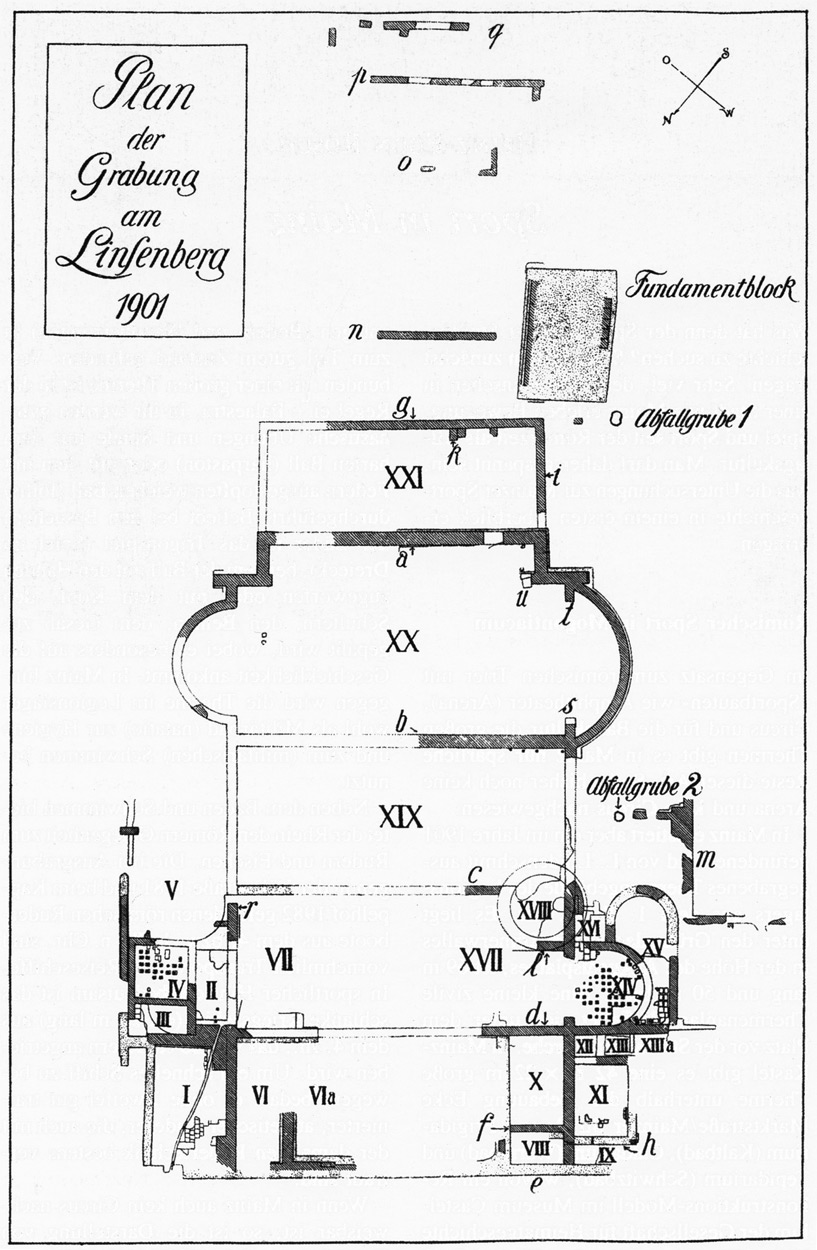
Plan of the excavations of the fort baths from 1901

A larger thermal bath building was built in the year 33 in the immediate vicinity of today's State Theatre and thus at the fork in the main road coming from the legionary camp. Due to the silty subsoil at the time, the building was placed on a pile foundation, the remains of which made it possible to date it precisely. The baths must have been one of the first large stone buildings in the otherwise sparsely populated city centre area. It was already destroyed in the second third of the 1st century, possibly in connection with the destruction of civilian facilities in Mogontiacum during the Batavi War. A successor building possibly stood somewhat offset and more central to the inner city centre that developed from the Flavian period onwards at today's Flachsmarkt. During construction work in the 1980s, massive remains of a larger building complex from the late 1st century were found 200 metres away in Hintere Christofsgasse. Large quantities of stamped hypocaust bricks and parts of a marble fountain could possibly speak in favour of a thermal bath building.

The fort baths belonging to the legionary camp were the only major building complex in the camp to be excavated and mapped in 1908. The fort baths were relatively large at 69 × 50 metres and were probably only built after the withdrawal of the second legion stationed in Mogontiacum after the year 90. Based on the structural remains, two construction phases could be determined: an older and smaller bath complex with a circular rudatorium from the late Flavian or early Trajanic period and a larger, completely remodelled second bath complex from the early Hadrianic period. This bath was in use until the camp was abandoned in the middle of the 4th century, as evidenced by a stamp of the 22nd legion with the addition C.V. for Constantiniana Victrix. The legion only used this name suffix from Constantinian times.

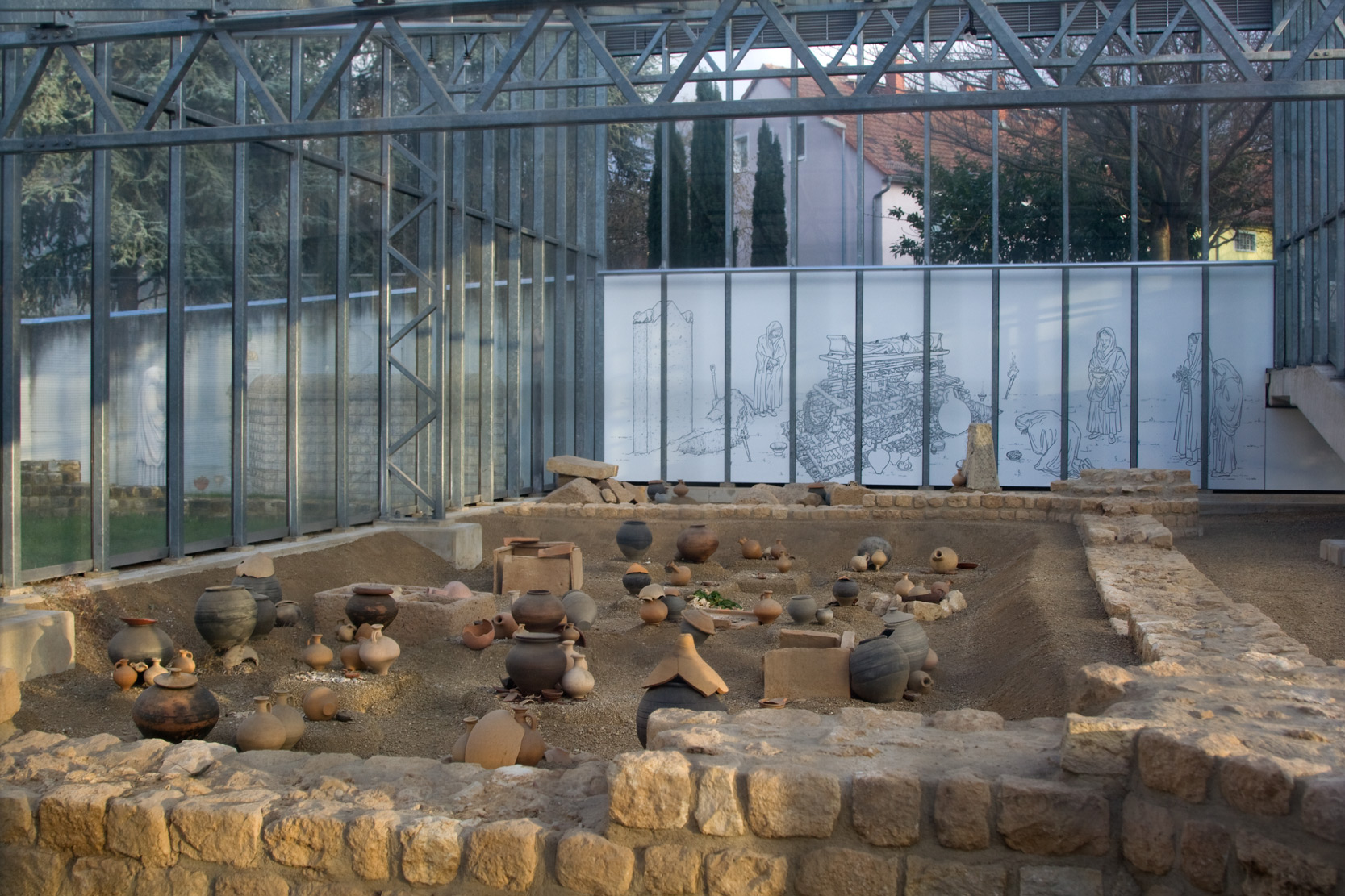
Exhibition of small artefacts from a cremation grave including a wall around the via sepulcrum in present-day Mainz-Weisenau

=== Burial grounds ===
There were numerous cemeteries in Mogontiacum, which spanned the settlement area in an arc. They were created in the 1st century and were used continuously until the 4th century, in some cases until the early Middle Ages. The starting points for the cemeteries were usually the transport routes leading from the legionary camp. In addition to the numerous smaller cemeteries around Mogontiacum, two larger burial sites can be identified, in Oberstadt/Weisenau and in Bretzenheim on the slope of the Zahlbach valley below the camp. Most of the gravestones found in Mainz to date also come from these two cemeteries.

A cemetery road (via sepulcrum) modelled on the Italo-Roman road existed along the connecting road between the legionary camp and the military camp or vicus in Weisenau. Evidence of Roman burial sites has been documented there since the end of the 18th century. After an initial investigation by Ernst Neeb in 1912, the burial sites there were only systematically researched between 1982 and 1992. Beginning with the starting point of the road at the legionary camp and in the vicinity of the Drusus Cenotaph, burials along the road have already been documented for the Augustan period. One of the first burial monuments in the immediate vicinity of the camp, which was created at the same time as the Drusus cenotaph, is the high-grade burial monument of the brothers Marcus and Caius Cassius, originally from Milan and members of Legio XIIII Gemina, which is known as the "Cassian Monument". In the direction of Weisenau, more and more burial monuments and grave enclosures were erected to both sides of the road, separated from it by a ditch, over a length of 2.5 kilometres until well into the 4th century. Due to its prestigious character along the important military road and its initial proximity to the Drusus Cenotaph, this burial site was evidently favoured by military personnel, Roman citizens living there and the wealthy Roman upper class. The military and civilian burials were carried out partly according to Italic custom and partly according to local customs. From the 2nd century onwards, the representative significance of the cemetery road slowly declined; some of the stone structures were demolished, and the material reused to build new tombs. Burial monuments were also removed as building material for the construction of the city wall in the 3rd and 4th centuries and incorporated in the form of spolia. Other cemeteries, especially in the northern settlement area, now became increasingly important.

A large Augustan military cemetery was located on the western slope of the Zahlbach valley, below the legionary camp. Numerous military burials took place here in the 1st century. The majority of the military gravestones found in Mainz, many of which are of high quality and epigraphic value, come from this cemetery. In the course of the 1st century, the cemetery expanded further southwards across the plateau. Towards the end of the 1st century, the number of military burials decreased drastically and shifted southwards near the theatre. The cemetery was now increasingly used by the civilian population of the increasingly important camp canabae, in the direction of which it expanded during the 2nd and 3rd centuries. A burial tradition could be established until well into the 4th century. The abandonment of this burial ground is certainly directly related to the abandonment of the legionary camp and the camp canabae around the middle of the 4th century.

Numerous other smaller cemeteries existed, for example, in today's Neustadt at Dimesser Ort or in the Gartenfeld, on the grounds of Mainz's main cemetery and the Johannes Gutenberg University and in almost all other suburbs of Mainz. Cemetery churches were built near some of these burial grounds in the late Roman period, which went hand in hand with the increased number of Christian burials up to the Frankish period.

=== Large buildings that could not be localised ===
In contrast to other larger Roman cities such as Trier or Cologne, the topography of Mogontiacum still has major gaps. It is therefore not surprising that the location of some of the larger administrative and civil buildings and squares is still unknown. The governor's palace built after the establishment of the province of Germania superior from the mid-80s of the 1st century is one of the large buildings that have not yet been localised. Several possible locations have been considered and discussed among experts. As the legionary camp was only occupied by one legion after the withdrawal of Legio XXI Rapax in the year 90 and offered enough space, the construction of a governor's palace and other administrative buildings in the inner area of the legionary camp was considered. A graffito on a shard of clay from the 2nd century gives the governor's address as "... praetorium ... ad hiberna leg XXII P P F" and is regarded as evidence in favour of this hypothesis. Recently, however, there has been a tendency to look for the location of the governor's palace outside the legionary camp, despite this inscription. Larger building remains with stamped bricks and marble furnishings in the old city centre in the area of Hintere Christofsgasse/Birnbaumgasse could be the remains of the sought-after governor's palace, which, similar to its Cologne counterpart, could have stood above the banks of the Rhine and elevated above it. It would also have been close to the "Flachsmarkt", the centre of the growing civilian settlement that emerged from the Flavian period onwards. Future excavations planned in the area of Birnbaumgasse should contribute to further clarification here. Another possible location would have been the area near today's State Theatre, which was also considered the central square in the area of the civilian settlement.

According to some scholars, the forum of Mogontiacum is most likely to have been located in the area of today's Schillerplatz. The central and flood-free location in the immediate vicinity of the legionary camp is an indication of this localisation. At the same time, Schillerplatz is the centre of numerous Roman roads that converged on it, giving the square a certain traffic centrality. Other possible locations, similar to the governor's palace, are the areas of Flachsmarkt and the urban area where the Mainz State Theatre complex and its annexes stand today.

In addition to the Roman stage theatre, there was almost certainly also an amphitheatre in Mogontiacum. Dedications by gladiators found on site are evidence of its existence. However, there are only vague indications as to its location. One possible location would be the Zahlbach valley near the Dalheim monastery, now no longer in existence, which would also be supported by its proximity to the legionary camp. In the records of the Mainz monk Siegehard from around 1100, there is mention of the ruins of a theatre in the Zahlbach valley, which is said to have been built for gladiator and circus games. In his Old History of Mainz (several volumes, published from 1771), Father Joseph Fuchs located the Mainz amphitheatre in a different place, namely between today's city centre and the Hechtsheimer Berg. There was a large semi-circle there, at the bottom of which the remains of strong pillars had been found.

The temple district for the state deities Jupiter, Juno and Minerva (Capitoline Triad) is also unknown. Based on the discovery of dedicatory inscriptions, the cathedral district is the most likely location; however, this hypothesis is not archaeologically verifiable.

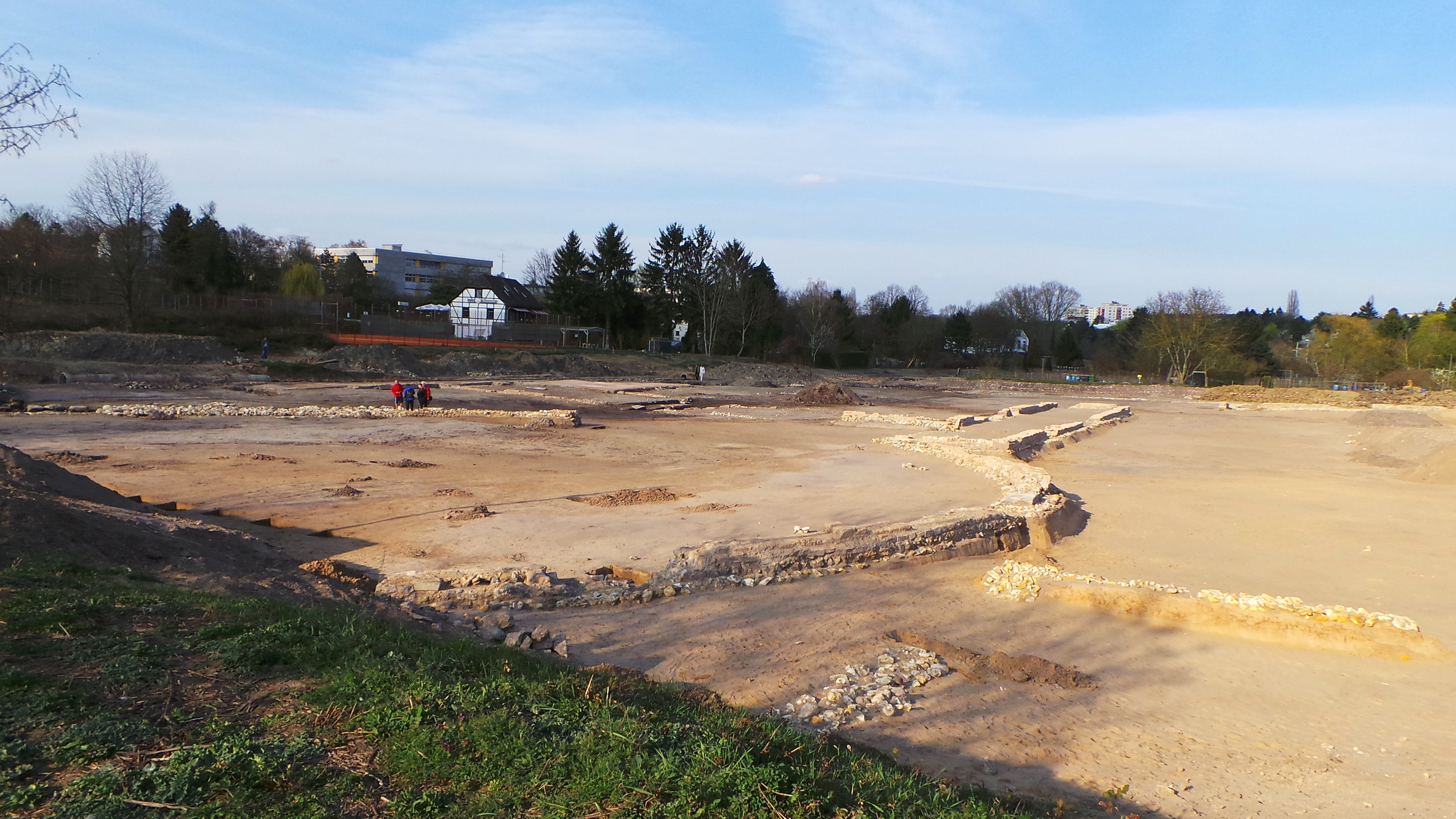
Structural remains of a Roman (military) stud farm in the Gonsbach valley near present-day Mainz-Gonsenheim

=== Outside the gates of Mogontiacum ===
==== Rural Settlement and Regional Infrastructure ====
In addition to the civil settlements in Weisenau and Bretzenheim, numerous villae rusticae developed over time in the immediate vicinity of Mogontiacum. There is evidence of these for example in Gonsenheim, Laubenheim, between the Lerchenberg and Ober-Olm and in almost all other suburbs of Mainz. They were increasingly responsible for supplying Mogontiacum with food and other agricultural goods, with the result that the civilian settlement gradually assumed the central market function for the surrounding area.

The nearest larger settlements on the left bank of the Rhine were Bingium (Bingen), Altiaia (Alzey) and above all the Civitas Vangionum/Borbetomagus (Worms). Other larger cities such as Augusta Treverorum (Trier) or the Colonia Claudia Ara Agrippinensium (Cologne) were also quickly accessible via well-developed roads such as the Roman road that preceded today's Hunsrückhöhenstraße or the Rheintalstraße. On the right bank of the Rhine, Aquae Mattiacorum (Wiesbaden) was founded in the late 1st century as the nearest neighbouring town. The hot springs there were highly valued by the Romans and remained in Roman hands until the middle of the 4th century.

==== Late antique stud farm in Gonsenheim ====
In the Gonsbach valley, which is part of the Gonsenheim district of Mainz, surprisingly large ruin complexes and the high-quality relief of a bound Teuton were found at the end of 2013 during "renaturalisation" measures. The size and structural quality of the Roman remains suggest that they were used for military purposes. A larger circular structure with a diameter of 40 m resembles an oval track or a lungeing course in modern equestrian sport, so that this was possibly a facility for Roman cavalrymen and their training - also in view of the favourable location of the stream and meadows for keeping animals. The site has since been identified by the responsible archaeologists from the Mainz Archaeology Directorate, Marion Witteyer, as a stud farm from late antiquity, which was possibly operated by the military stationed in Mogontiacum.

== Significant individual finds ==
Over the centuries, many finds from the time of the ancient Mogontiacum have certainly been made in Mainz. In the early and high Middle Ages there were virtually no records of this in historiography, but this changed with the Renaissance and the subsequent Age of Enlightenment at the latest. At that time, significant individual finds were mainly stone artefacts such as gravestones or monuments. There was then a significant increase in individual finds, especially in the 19th and early 20th centuries, when intensive building activity began in the town and older structures such as the Roman-medieval town wall were finally demolished. Other small finds were repeatedly made in the Rhine, such as the "Sword of Tiberius" in 1848. This is a very well-preserved gladius with richly decorated brass fittings on the scabbard. These show high-quality motifs from the official political and propagandistic image programme of Tiberius' Germanic policy. Both have been in the British Museum in London since the 19th century, a copy of which can be found in the Roman-Germanic Central Museum. In the second half of the 20th century, a number of individual finds were made, which today are among the most important artefacts from Mogontiacum's Roman past. In 1962, the year of the supposed 2000th anniversary of the city of Mainz, a marble head was found that dates back to the early 1st century. The person depicted is attributed to the Julio-Claudian imperial family and was made in an Italian workshop. No qualitatively comparable counterpart has yet been found in Mainz. As the find was made by chance without any direct context, the authenticity of the piece was initially doubted. In the meantime, however, the dating of the marble head has been confirmed by detailed analyses.

In 1981, a total of nine different ship remains from the early and late Roman period were found in an excavation pit near the Rhine. The Mainz Roman ships were the more or less well-preserved remains of a total of five military ships of two different types (Navis lusoria) as well as civilian cargo ships such as a barge. The special significance of the finds not only resulted in extensive restoration work, but also led to the establishment of a dedicated research centre for "Ancient Seafaring" in Mainz and the establishment of its own museum.

In 1999, the architectural remains of an Isis and Mater Magna sanctuary from the 1st century were unexpectedly discovered. The finds provide a detailed insight into the cultic-religious everyday life of the provincial Roman population of Mogontiacum. Of particular importance are the 34 different curse tablets found here, which almost double the number of curse tablets known in Germany.

== Christianity in Mogontiacum ==
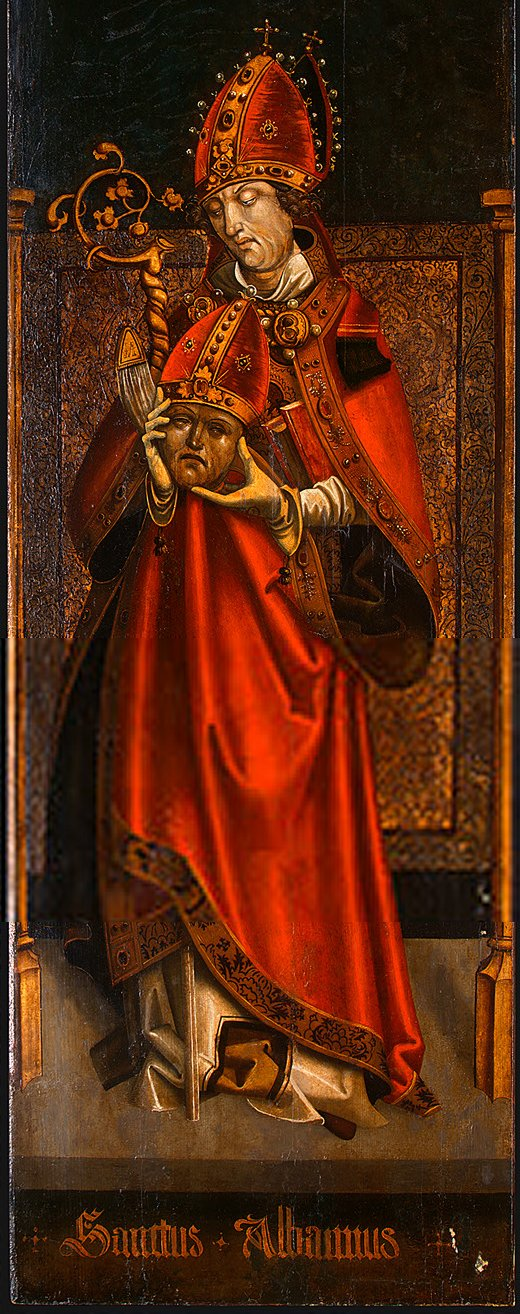
Saint Alban of Mainz (early 16th century painting, National Gallery of Art, Washington, DC)

It is not clear when christianity first gained a foothold in Mogontiacum. The current state of research is that there is no definitive evidence of any kind of organised christianity or christian martyrs in Mogontiacum in the period before the Constantinian shift. Even after the Constantinian shift in the religious policy of the Roman Empire, the development of an organised church community was slow. Due to the city's centuries-long status as a central military base, other religious cults such as the imperial cult and other cults favoured by the military, such as the worship of Mithras, continued to dominate for a long time. Compared to other, less militarised cities such as Trier or Cologne, this delayed the development of a christian community in Mogontiacum.

The first confirmed reference to a larger christian community in Mogontiacum dates back to 368. In connection with the invasion of the Alemanni under Rando, Ammianus Marcellinus reported on a large number of christians who gathered for a church festival and were partly abducted by the Alemanni. Ammianus explicitly emphasises that the captives included men and women of all social classes, which suggests that a christian community with believers from the upper classes had already been established for some time. A second indication of a large church community in Mogontiacum is provided by the late antique church father and theologian Jerome in a letter written to the Gallo-Roman Ageruchia around 409:

"Mogontiacus, once a highly famous city, was conquered and lies destroyed, many thousands were slaughtered in the church ..."

Jerome refers here to the destruction of Mogontiacum (incorrectly spelt Mogontiacus) during the crossing of the Rhine by Germanic peoples in 406/407. The martyrdom of Saint Alban of Mainz, which he suffered in Mogontiacum, is also associated with this event. Two other Christian martyrs are possibly attributed to Hun invasions that took place around 436 in connection with the destruction of the Burgundian Empire on the Rhine or later to Hun soldiers during Attila's western campaign in 451. The bishop of Mogontiacum Aureus and his sister Justina are said to have been martyred in the process.

=== Bishops of the Roman period ===
In older literature, the first bishop of Mogontiacum known by name is a Mar(t)inus. The signature of a Martinus episcopus Mogontiacensium at a synod in Cologne on 12 May 346, at which 14 Gallic and Germanic bishops met to depose and excommunicate the bishop of Cologne, Euphrates, is regarded as proof of this. It is now generally accepted that the records of this synod date back to a forgery, probably from the 10th century, and that this synod, at least with this aim, did not exist. Moreover, a Bishop Mar(t)inus cannot be fixed historically apart from his mention there.

This also applies to a number of other bishop names from Roman times, which are mentioned in eight different versions of medieval bishop lists. Beginning with a Crescentius in the 1st century, who was regarded as a pupil of Paul of Tarsus, a varying number of bishops are named up to Sidonius, who can be traced back to the middle of the 6th century. Only Aureus is considered relatively certain for the middle of the 5th century. It is possible that there were Roman bishops with the names Marinus, Theomastus/Theonest, Sophronius/Suffronius or Maximus before this, but these are not historically clear, but at best can only be identified indirectly. One indication of the earlier existence of Roman bishops in Mogontiacum is the reference in the greeting by the church scholar Hilary of Poitiers from the year 358/359, which he dedicates to the "beloved and blessed brothers and fellow bishops of the provinces of Germania prima and Germania secunda", among others.

=== Roman church foundations ===
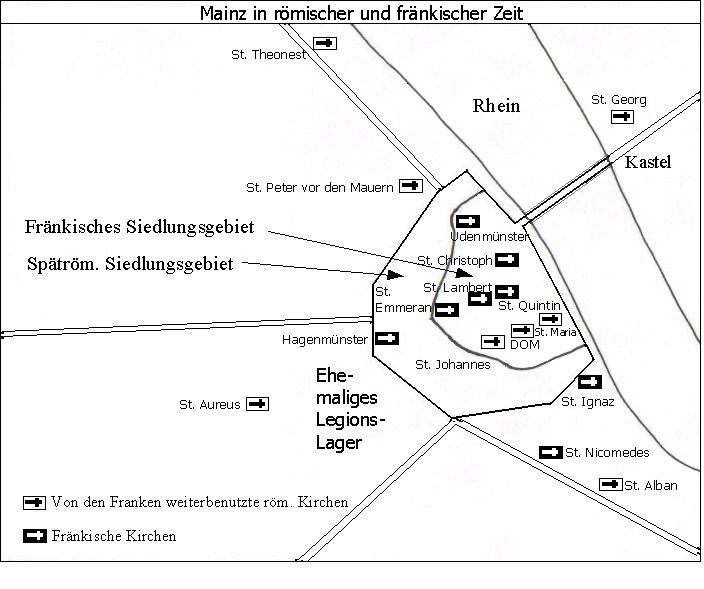
Roman and Frankish churches in Mainz

The location of an official Roman episcopal church and its date of origin are still unclear and are the subject of controversial debate among experts. What is relatively certain is that this church could not have been located under today's cathedral site. Excavations in 1950/51 (and 2013 to 2017) uncovered the foundations of a larger late Roman building under the nearby Protestant church of Saint John. Since then, these have often been interpreted as the remains of the first episcopal church, which can be thought of as a family of churches with a cathedral. The period after 350 and before 368 (mention of a larger christian community by Ammianus Marcellinus) is now regarded as the possible date of origin of an episcopal or at least larger church.

The only late Roman sacred building in Mogontiacum that was clearly proven archaeologically in 1907/10 was the basilica of Saint Alban. This cemetery church in the area of the burial ground to the south was built in the first half of the 5th century using high-quality Roman masonry. The dedication to the patron saint Alban of Mainz suggests that it was built shortly after the Germanic invasion in 406/407. His martyrdom probably took place in connection with the devastation of the city. It is possible that there was already a predecessor building in Roman times, as indicated by Christian gravestones from the late 4th century found on site. The single-nave basilica without apses was built over the tomb of Saint Alban and measured 15 × 30 metres.

The emergence of further cemetery churches in the late 4th and early 5th centuries can only be indirectly attributed to the Roman period, but is considered probable. The chapel and later church of Saint Hilary was the burial church of the bishops of Mainz until the 8th century, which speaks for its early importance. It was built in the Zahlbach valley, from the early 1st century the burial place mainly of the military and, in early Christian tradition, the vallis sacra of Mogontiacum. Further to the north, Saint Theomast (which gave its name to the village of Dimesser Ort), Saint Clemens and Saint Peter (Saint Peter ex muros or Old Saint Peter) can also be assumed to have been built in late Roman times. In the case of the latter church, this is relatively certain due to the continuity of gravestones with Roman and Germanic names.

== Research history of Mogontiacum ==
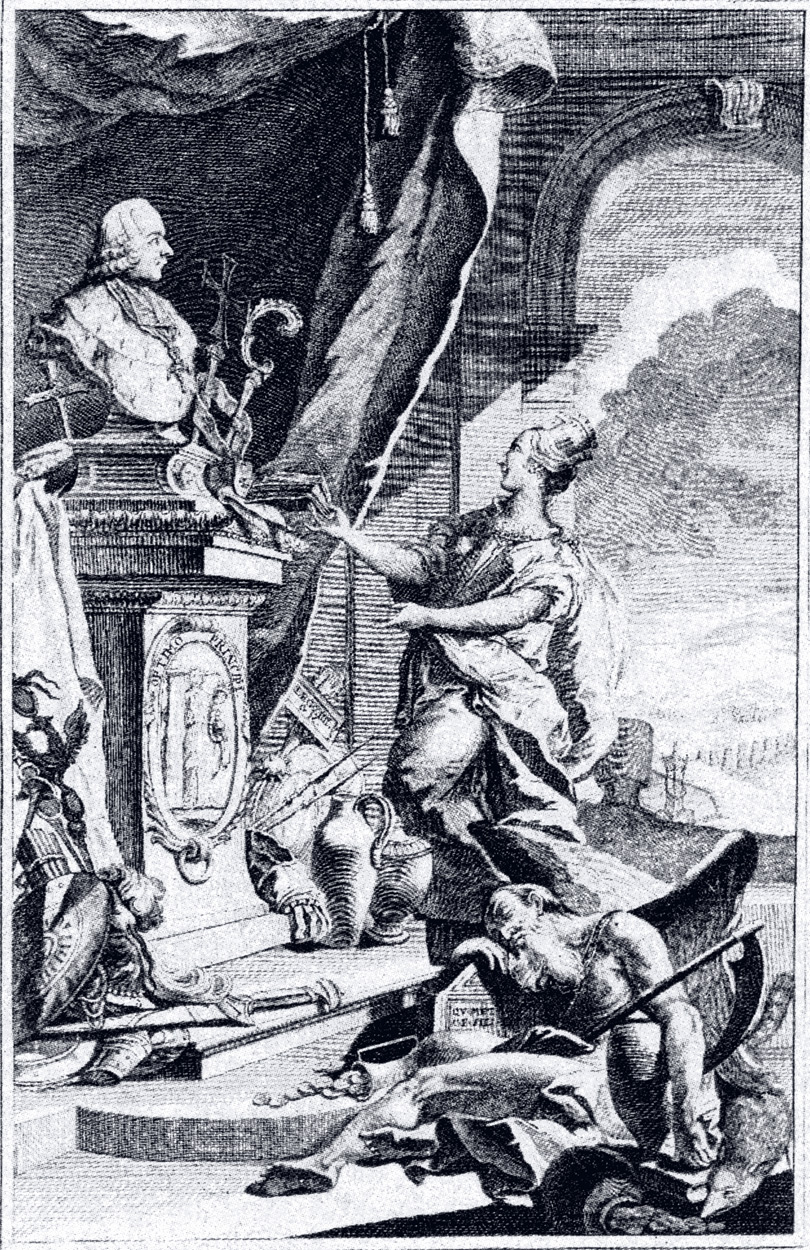
Frontispiece of the book Alte Geschichte von Mainz with the personification of the city, surrounded by symbols and remnants of Mainz's Roman past, dedicating the book to Elector Emmerich Joseph von Breidbach zu Bürresheim

Research into the Roman Mogontiacum began in electoral Mainz in the age of the Renaissance and under the influence of humanism. Again and again, scientists, scholars, but also clergymen, military officers and civil engineers from the electoral court or the University of Mainz were involved. A pioneer of research into Mogontiacum was Dietrich Gresemund, doctor of both laws and canon of St. Stephan's. He collected Roman inscriptions and wrote a treatise on his collection as early as 1511, which was lost after his sudden death in 1512. He was directly followed by Johannes Huttich, who published his work Collectana antiquitatum in urbe atque agro Moguntino repertarum in 1520 with the support of Elector Albert of Brandenburg. Other researchers of Roman history included the Mainz cathedral vicar Georg Helwich, whose work Antiquitates Moguntiacenses has been lost, as well as writings by Heinrich Engels, dean of St. Peter's Abbey, and Johann Kraft Hiegell, military physician to the Elector of Mainz. The commander of the Mainz fortress, Johann Freiherr von Thüngen, also joined the circle of collectors of Roman monuments and book authors. Due to the intensive building activity in Mainz after the Thirty Years' War, especially during the expansion of the Mainz fortress, many Roman stone monuments were found, which Thüngen was able to examine and describe at first hand. This work has also been lost.

The second half of the 18th century was an important period in the history of research into Mainz's Roman past. In 1765, the Elector of Mainz Emmerich Joseph von Breidbach zu Bürresheim gave all the Roman stone monuments that had been found and collected to date to Elector Karl-Theodor von der Pfalz. After drastically decimating the stock of Roman stone monuments in this way (some of these pieces can still be found today in the Reiss-Engelhorn-Museums of the city of Mannheim), he commissioned the Benedictine priest Joseph Fuchs to write a comprehensive work on the history of Mainz in return. Father Fuchs' work on the ancient history of Mainz was generously sponsored by him and the first two volumes were published in 1771/72. Further volumes were planned, and some manuscripts already existed, but the death of his patron in 1774 interrupted Fuchs' work. Nevertheless, the two published volumes with their numerous copperplate engravings of Roman inscriptions and monuments and Fuchs' work in general are considered a significant breakthrough in the research and documentation of Mainz's Roman past. In the last quarter of the 18th century, the public exhibition of collected Roman stone monuments also began. In 1784, under Elector Friedrich Karl Joseph von Erthal, the first Electorate of Mainz law on the preservation of monuments was passed and a cabinet of coins and antiquities attached to the University of Mainz was founded.

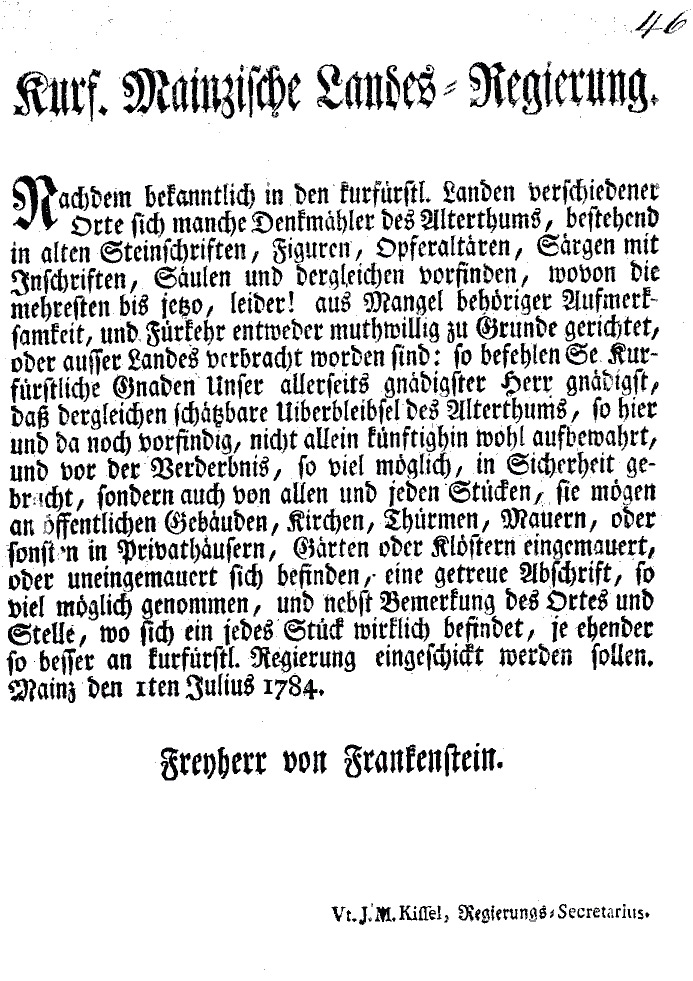
Wording of the monument preservation law of 1784

During the years when Mainz belonged to the French Empire (1792/93 and 1798 to 1814), it was above all the librarian and university professor Friedrich Lehne who took a greater interest in Mayence's Roman past. His commitment was favoured by the French administration, which set up a Commission pour la conservation des antiques as early as 1798 and planned an "antiquities museum" in the form of the Conservatoire des antiques à Mayence. The Roman past also played a major role in the Société départementale, founded in 1802, of which Lehne was secretary. Lehne gave numerous lectures on Roman history and wrote treatises on the same subject, for example on the Eichelstein. With the support of the French prefect Jeanbon Saint-André, he carried out the first systematic excavations in Mainz. He uncovered a large number of military gravestones at the former military cemetery on the slope of the Zahlbach valley. With these and older artefacts, he set up a publicly accessible antiquities hall in the former Burse on Neubrunnenplatz. Its collection of Roman stone monuments quickly grew in importance and also attracted famous guests such as Johann Wolfgang von Goethe, who wrote about it several times. This collection was later transferred to the Mainz Museum of Antiquities (now the Mainz State Museum) and is now on display in the so-called Stone Hall, the former riding hall of the Electoral Stables.

Until the middle of the 19th century, local notables such as Karl Anton Schaab (Electoral-Mainz court advocate and later vice president of the district court), Nikolaus Müller (painter, writer and curator of the picture gallery) and Ludwig Lindenschmit the Younger (artist, later director of the Roman-Germanic Central Museum) were the driving forces behind research into the Roman past of Mayence/Mainz. In 1841, the Gesellschaft der Freunde vaterländischer Geschichtsforschung und Altertumskunde was founded in Mainz, followed by the Römisch-Germanisches Zentralmuseum in 1852. For the first time, this ensured the scientific processing, evaluation and preservation of Roman artefacts. In 1875, J. Becker published his work Die römischen Inschriften und Steindenkmäler des Museums der Stadt Mainz (The Roman Inscriptions and Stone Monuments of the Museum of the City of Mainz), which was supplemented and expanded a total of four times up to the beginning of the 20th century. Between 1904 and 1907, all known Roman inscriptions were published in the Corpus Inscriptionum Latinarum (Volume XIII). Since the 1980s, research into Mainz's Roman past has been in the hands of the state of Rhineland-Palatinate, which provides archaeological support via the Mainz branch of the Rhineland-Palatinate Directorate of State Archaeology (part of the Rhineland-Palatinate General Directorate for Cultural Heritage, GDKE).

== Museum presentation of the Roman history of Mainz ==
Founded in 1803, today's Landesmuseum Mainz has housed an important collection of Roman stone monuments from Mogontiacum since its foundation. This consists of around 2000 individual pieces, of which just over 1000 are completely preserved. It includes civil and military funerary monuments, altars, inscriptions, architectural elements and well-known individual finds such as the large Mainz Jupiter Column, the Dativius Victor Arch, the bronze head of a Celtic goddess ("Rosmerta") and the "Mainz Marble Head". After more than 200 years, the collection was spun off in 2010 and assigned to the Roman-Germanic Central Museum (RGZM), which will display it in its new building at Mainz Roman Theatre station from 2024. The museum also has an extensive Roman period collection consisting of pottery, glassware, military equipment, jewellery and other small finds.

The RGZM was founded in 1852 as a result of the activities of Ludwig Lindenschmit the Elder and other members of the Mainz Antiquities Society and is currently still located in the Electoral Palace in Mainz. However, a move to new buildings at Mainz South Station is planned. In addition to various other thematic departments, the RGZM has a department dedicated to provincial Roman archaeology, where it also exhibits finds made mainly in Mainz. The RGZM issues its own publications in the form of the Archäologisches Korrespondenzblatt, the RGZM Yearbooks and other specialist monographs.

The museum also includes the world-renowned restoration workshops of the RGZM and the Museum of Ancient Seafaring with the research area of Ancient Seafaring. This research area was established after the salvage and restoration of the Mainz Roman ships. The museum was subsequently founded and has been housed at Mainz Südbahnhof (now Mainz Roman Theatre station) since 1994. In addition to other exhibits on the subject, the restored Roman ships from the 1981/82 ship finds and the full-size replica of two warships are on display here.

In the basement of the Römerpassage in Mainz city centre, numerous small finds that came to light during the excavations are exhibited together with the structural remains of the Isis and Mater Magna sanctuary found there. A number of smaller local museums are also dedicated to the Roman past, such as the Museum Castellum in Mainz-Kastel and smaller local exhibitions in banks, ministries and other public buildings in Mainz.
