= 70s =

Eighth decade of the first century AD

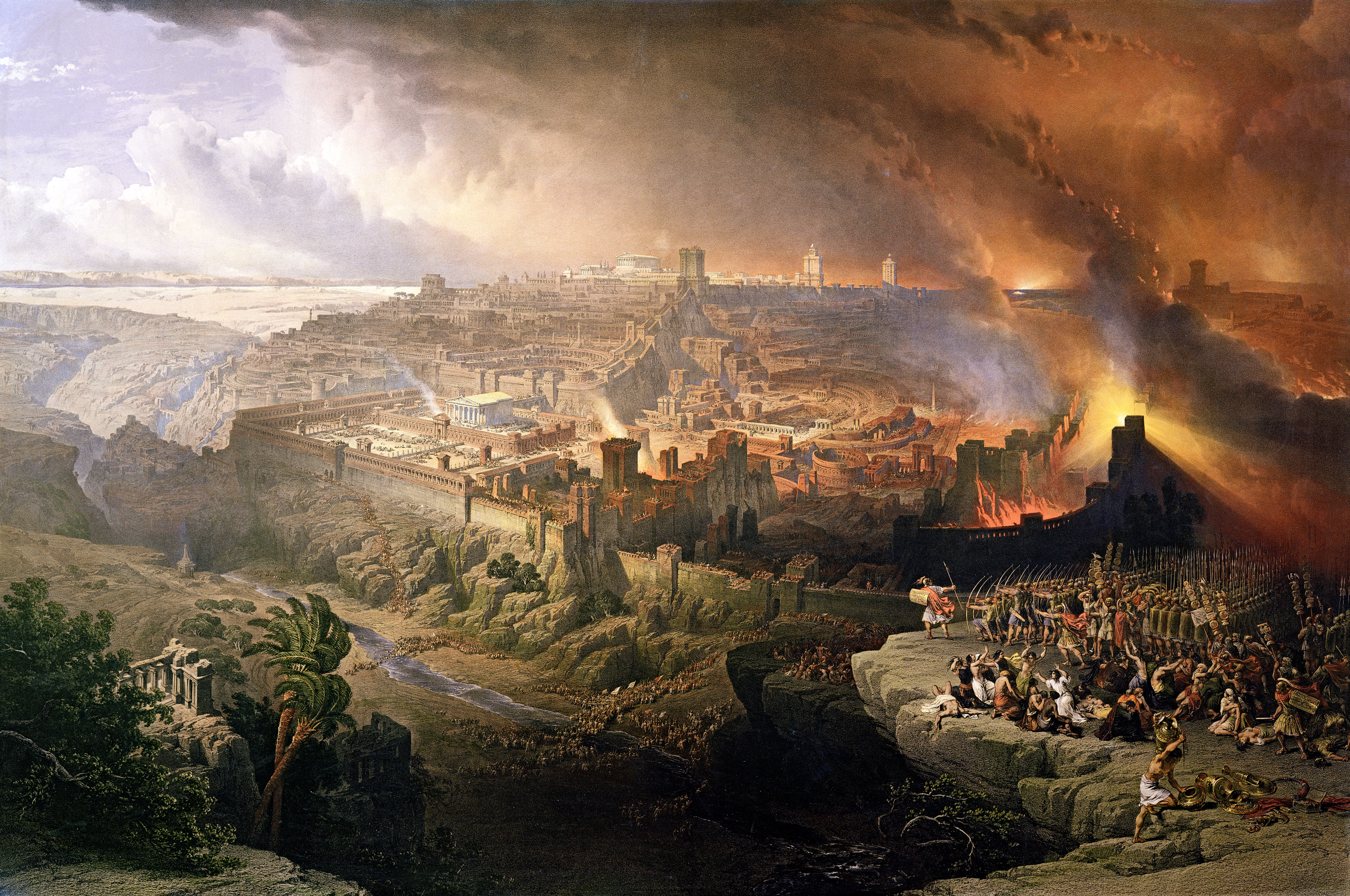
19th-century painting depicting the siege of Jerusalem (70).

The 70s was a decade that ran from January 1, AD 70, to December 31, AD 79.

As the decade began, the First Jewish–Roman War continued: In AD 70, the Romans besieged and sacked Jerusalem and destroyed the Second Temple. After this major victory, the Romans continued to clear pockets of Jewish resistance, with the final stronghold taken being Masada (73). The Flavian dynasty, which included emperors Vespasian and Titus, ruled the empire during this decade. During their reign, the Romans faced military challenges from various sources, including clashes with British and Germanic tribes. However, the Romans were largely successful in defeating these tribes, expanding their territories and consolidating their power. Following the death of Vologases I in 78, Parthia saw internal conflict as Vologases II and Pacorus II competed for the throne. In China, the Han–Xiongnu War was re-invigorated, with the Han defeating the Northern Xiongnu in the Battle of Yiwulu (73). In 75, Emperor Ming of Han died, being succeeded by Emperor Zhang: the reign of these two emperors is considered to have been a golden age.

The destruction of Jerusalem and the Second Temple during the First Jewish–Roman War marked a major turning point in Jewish history. The loss of mother-city and temple necessitated a reshaping of Jewish culture to ensure its survival. Judaism's Temple-based sects, including the priesthood and the Sadducees, diminished in importance. A new form of Judaism that became known as Rabbinic Judaism developed out of Pharisaic school and, centuries later, eventually became the mainstream form of the religion. Many followers of Jesus of Nazareth also survived the city's destruction. They spread his teachings across the Roman Empire, giving rise to the new religion of Christianity.

In the autumn of 79, Mount Vesuvius violently spewed forth a deadly cloud of super-heated tephra and gases to a height of 33 km (21 mi), ejecting molten rock, pulverized pumice and hot ash. The event destroyed several towns and minor settlements in the area, at the time part of the Roman Empire. Pompeii and Herculaneum, obliterated and buried underneath massive pyroclastic surges and ashfall deposits, are the most famous examples. The total population of both cities was over 20,000. The remains of over 1,500 people have been found at Pompeii and Herculaneum so far, although the total death toll from the eruption remains unknown.

The period also saw significant architectural and engineering accomplishments, such as the construction of the Colosseum in Rome. In 75, Vespasian erected a colossal statue of Apollo, begun under Nero, and he dedicated a stage of the theatre of Marcellus. Valerius Flaccus wrote the Argonautica, an epic poem. Pliny the Elder composed the 10-volume Natural History, covering topics including astronomy, mathematics, geography, ethnography, anthropology, human physiology, zoology, botany, agriculture, horticulture, pharmacology, mining, mineralogy, sculpture, art, and precious stones.

Manning (2008) tentatively estimates the world population in AD 70 to have been 250 million.

== Events ==
=== AD 70 ===
==== By place ====
====== Roman Empire ======
- Emperor Vespasian and his son Caesar Vespasian (the future Emperor Titus) become Roman consuls.
- Panic strikes Rome as adverse winds delay grain shipments from Africa and Egypt, producing a bread shortage. Ships laden with wheat from North Africa sail 300 miles to Rome's port of Ostia in 3 days, and the 1,000 mile voyage from Alexandria averages 13 days. The vessels often carry 1,000 tons each to provide the city with the 8,000 tons per week it normally consumes.
- Sextus Julius Frontinus is praetor of Rome. Legio II Adiutrix is created from marines of Classis Ravennatis.
- Pliny the Elder serves as procurator in Gallia Narbonensis.
- 14th of Xanthikos (14th of Nisan, about April 14) – Siege of Jerusalem: Titus surrounds the Jewish capital, with three legions (V Macedonica, XII Fulminata and XV Apollinaris) on the western side and a fourth (X Fretensis) on the Mount of Olives to the east. He puts pressure on the food and water supplies of the inhabitants by allowing pilgrims to enter the city to celebrate Passover and then refusing them egress.
- About April 21 – Titus opens a full-scale assault on Jerusalem, concentrating his attack on the city's Third Wall (HaHoma HaShlishit) to the northwest. The Roman army begins trying to breach the wall using testudos, mantlets, siege towers, and battering rams.
- 7th of Artemisios (7th of Iyar, about May 6) – The Third Wall of Jerusalem collapses and the Jews withdraw from Bezetha to the Second Wall, where the defences are unorganized.
- 12th of Artemisios (12th of Iyar, about May 11) – Titus and his Roman legions breach the Second Wall of Jerusalem. The Jewish defenders retreat to the First Wall. The Romans start building a circumvallation; all trees within 90 stadia (ca. fifteen kilometres) of the city are cut down.
- 21st of Artemisios (about May 20 or 21) – A "certain prodigious and incredible phenomenon", "chariots and troops" seen running in the clouds around Jerusalem
- Pentecost (Shavuot, 6th of Sivan, about June 4) – Priests in the Temple in Jerusalem feel a quaking and hear "a sound as of a great multitude saying, Let us remove hence".
- 17th of Panemos (17th of Tammuz), about July 14) – Sacrifices cease in the temple.
- 24th of Panemos (about July 20) – Romans set fire to a cloister after the capture of the Fortress of Antonia, north of the Temple Mount. The Romans are drawn into street fighting with the Zealots.
- 10th of Loios (9th or 10th of Av, about August 4) – Titus destroys the Jewish Temple in Jerusalem. Roman troops are stationed in Jerusalem and abolish the Jewish high priesthood and Sanhedrin. This becomes known as the Fall of Jerusalem, a conclusive event in the First Jewish–Roman War (the Jewish Revolt), which began in 66 AD. Following this event, the Jewish religious leadership moves from Jerusalem to Jamnia (present-day Yavne), and this date is mourned annually as the Jewish fast of Tisha B'Av.
- August – Titus captures Jerusalem.
- 8th of Gorpiaios (8th of Elul, about September 2) – Romans gain control of all of Jerusalem and proceed to burn it and kill its remaining residents, except for some who are taken captive to be killed later or enslaved.
- Neapolis (present-day Nablus) is founded in Iudaea Province.
- Naval clashes on the Rhine during the Batavian Revolt; the crew of a captured Roman flagship is imprisoned at Augusta Treverorum (modern Trier).
- Roman legions V Alaudae and XV Primigenia are destroyed by the Batavi. Later, Quintus Petillius Cerialis puts down the Batavian rebellion of Gaius Julius Civilis.
- Vespasian disbands four Rhine legions (I Germanica, IV Macedonica, XV Primigenia and XVI Gallica), disgraced for having surrendered or lost their eagles during the revolt of Julius Civilis.
- Later Roman emperor Domitian marries Domitia Longina.
- Romans make a punitive expedition against the Garamantes – they are forced to have an official relationship with the Roman Empire.
- Annexation of the island of Samothrace by the Roman Empire under Vespasian.

====== Asia ======
- India sees the end of the Hellenistic dynasties.
- A flood in the yellow river returns the river north of Shandong, to essentially its present course

====== Africa ======
- Expedition by the Roman Septimius Flaccus to southern Egypt. He probably reaches Sudan.
- Ze-Hakèlé (Zoskales in Greek) becomes king of Aksum.

==== By topic ====
====== Religion ======
- Following the destruction of Jerusalem, the Sanhedrin moved to Jamnia.
- Members of the Oneida Community, a now non-existent religious group formed in the nineteenth century, believed this was the year Jesus Christ returned.

=== AD 71 ===
==== By place ====
====== Roman Empire ======
- The Romans establish a fortress at York (Eboracum), as a base for their northern forces. Initially established solely for Legio IX Hispana, it expands later to include public housing, baths and temples.
- Battle of Stanwick: Quintus Petillius Cerialis, governor of Britain, puts down a revolt by the Brigantes.
- Emperors Vespasian and Marcus Cocceius Nerva are Roman Consuls.
- Battle of Treves: Cerialis defeats Claudius Civilis, thus quelling the Batavian rebellion.
- Titus is awarded with a triumph, accompanied by Vespasian and his brother Titus Flavius Domitian. In the parade are Jewish prisoners and treasures of the Temple of Jerusalem, including the Menorah and the Pentateuch. The leader of the Zealots, Simon Bar Giora, is lashed and strangled in the Forum.
- Titus is made praetorian prefect of the Praetorian Guard and receives pro-consular command and also tribunician power, all of which indicates that Vespasian will follow the hereditary tradition of succession.
- Herodium, a Jewish fortress south of Jerusalem, is conquered and destroyed by Legio X Fretensis on their way to Masada.
- Doncaster is founded by Roman settlers. The area was originally known as Danum.

====== Asia ======
- Reign of Rabel II, king of Nabataea. He makes Bostra, Syria, his second capital.

==== By topic ====
====== Religion ======
- Mithraism begins to spread throughout the Roman Empire.

=== AD 72 ===
==== By place ====
====== Roman Empire ======
- Antiochus IV of Syria is deposed by Emperor Vespasian.
- Vespasian and Titus are Roman Consuls.
- First Jewish–Roman War: The Roman army (Legio X Fretensis) under Sextus Lucilius Bassus lays siege to the Jewish garrison of Machaerus at the Dead Sea. After they capitulate, the Zealots are allowed to leave the fortress before it is destroyed.
- The Romans lay siege to Masada, a desert fortress held by the Sicarii.
- Flavia Neapolis (Nablus) is founded.
- Vespasian starts the building of the Colosseum; the amphitheatre is used for gladiatorial games and public spectacles, such as sea battles, re-enactments of famous battles, and dramas of Classical mythology.

=== AD 73 ===
==== By place ====
====== Roman Empire ======
- Vespasian and Titus are appointed to be Roman censors.
- Spring – The Roman governor Lucius Flavius Silva lays siege to Masada, the last outpost of the Jewish rebels following the end, in AD 70, of the First Jewish-Roman War (Jewish Revolt). The Roman army (Legio X Fretensis) surrounds the mountain fortress with a 7-mile long siege wall (circumvallation) and builds a rampart of stones and beaten earth against the western approach. After the citadel is conquered, 960 Zealots under the leadership of Eleazar ben Ya'ir commit mass suicide when defeat becomes imminent.
- Pliny the Elder serves as procurator in Hispania Tarraconensis.
- Titus Flavius Domitianus becomes Roman Consul.
- Emperor Vespasian begins conquest of territory east of the upper Rhine and south of the Main. In addition, he reorganizes the defenses of the upper and lower Danube.

====== Asia ======
- February – The Chinese Han dynasty launches a major campaign against the Xiongnu, whom they confront in the Battle of Yiwulu in the Kumul oasis, an ultimate Han military victory led by General Dou Gu (d. AD 88).
- Ban Chao (Pan-Ch’ao), competing with the Xiongnu, imposes a Chinese protectorate on the kings of Lop Nor and Khotan in the Tarim Basin, with the aim of controlling the Silk Road.

==== By topic ====
====== Arts and sciences ======
- Martial writes a satire on "military cowardice".

=== AD 74 ===
==== By place ====
====== Roman Empire ======
- Emperor Vespasian and his son Titus Caesar Vespasianus become Roman Consuls.
- The Black Forest region is reattached to the Roman Empire.
- December 27 – Vespasian grants generous privileges to doctors and teachers.

====== Asia ======
- Emperor Ming of Han appoints Chen Mu to the revived office of Protector of the Western Regions.
- Chinese generals Dou Gu (Teou Kou) and Geng Bing (Keng Ping) take control of Turpan.

==== By topic ====
====== Arts and Science ======
- Mesopotamia: The last known cuneiform text is written.

=== AD 75 ===
==== By place ====
====== Roman Empire ======
- Emperor Vespasian and his son Titus Caesar Vespasianus become Roman Consuls.
- The Temple of Peace, also known as the Forum of Vespasian, is built in Rome. The temple celebrates the conquest of Jerusalem (in AD 70) and houses the Menorah from Herod's Temple.
- Vespasian fortifies Armazi (Georgia) for the Iberian king Mithridates I. The Alans raid the Roman frontier in Armenia.
- Sextus Julius Frontinus becomes governor of Britannia and makes his headquarters in Isca Augusta (Wales).
- Frontinus begins his conquest of Wales; Legio II Augusta is moved to the border of the River Usk.

====== Asia ======
- Accession of Han Zhangdi of the Han dynasty (until AD 88).
- Revolt against the Chinese in Tarim: Cachera and Turpan are besieged. Luoyang orders the evacuation of Tarim. Ban Chao makes the rebels retreat towards Khotan. At the same time, the Chinese army of Ganzhou reconquers Turpan in Northern Xiongnu. Ban Chao convinces the emperor of the need to control Central Asia in the fight against Xiongnu.

=== AD 76 ===
==== By place ====
====== Roman Empire ======
- Emperors Vespasianus Augustus and Titus Caesar Vespasianus become Roman Consuls.
- Governor Sextus Julius Frontinus subdues the Silures and other hostile tribes of Wales, establishing a fortress at Caerleon or Isca Augusta for Legio II Augusta, and makes a network of smaller forts for his auxiliary forces.

====== China ======
- First year of Jianchu era of the Chinese Han dynasty. ^{(Clarification needed as to the meaning of this)}

==== By topic ====
====== Art and Science ======
- Chinese historian Ban Gu develops a theory of the origins of the universe.

====== Religion ======
- Pope Anacletus I succeeds Pope Linus as the third pope of the Catholic Church (according to the official Vatican list).

=== AD 77 ===
==== By place ====
====== Roman Empire ======
- Gnaeus Julius Agricola is named governor of Britannia, a post he occupies until AD 84. He extends the Roman influence to the mouth of the River Clyde (Scotland), and builds fortifications.
- Agricola subdues the Ordovices in Wales, and pursues the remnants of the tribe to Anglesey, the holy island of the Druids.
- The Caledonian tribes in Scotland form a confederacy of 30,000 warriors, under the leadership of Calgacus.
- Winter – Agricola conquers Anglesey, and disperses his army to their winter quarters.

====== Asia ======
- King Giru of Baekje succeeds to the throne of Baekje in the Korean Peninsula.

==== By topic ====
====== Arts and sciences ======
- Pliny the Elder publishes the first ten books of Naturalis Historia.
- The Romans develop a simple method of distillation.

=== AD 78 ===
==== By place ====
====== Roman Empire ======
- The Romans conquer the Ordovices, located in present-day northern Wales, as well as the Silures.
- Gnaeus Julius Agricola replaces Sextus Julius Frontinus as governor of Roman Britain, which leads to the conquering of portions of Wales and northern England.

====== Asia ======
- Indian Prince Aji Caka introduces the Sanskrit language and Pallawa script, used to inscribe Javanese words and phrases, to the Indonesian islands.
- Emperor Kadphises of the Kushan Empire sends a delegation to Rome, to seek support against the Parthians.
- This is the base year (year zero) of the Saka era used by some Hindu calendars, the Indian national calendar, and the Cambodian Buddhist calendar. It begins near the vernal equinox for the civil solar calendar, but begins opposite the star Spica for the traditional solar calendar.
- Pacorus II becomes king of the Parthian Empire (r. 78–115).

==== By topic ====
====== Philosophy ======
- The Chinese philosopher Wang Chong (Wang-Ch'ung) claims all phenomena have material causes.

=== AD 79 ===
==== By place ====
====== Roman Empire ======
- Vespasianus Augustus and Titus Caesar Vespasianus become Roman Consuls.
- June 23 – Emperor Vespasian dies of fever from diarrhea; his last words on his deathbed are: "I think I'm turning into a god." Titus succeeds his father as Roman emperor. Titus' Jewish mistress, Berenice, comes to join him in Rome, but he exiles her to please the Senate.
- August 24 or c. October 24 – Eruption of Mount Vesuvius: Mount Vesuvius erupts, destroying Pompeii, Herculaneum, Stabiae and Oplontis. The Roman navy (based at Misenum), commanded by Pliny the Elder, evacuates refugees. Pliny dies after inhaling volcanic fumes.
- Roman conquest of Britain: Gnaeus Julius Agricola campaigns in Britain:
  - Chester is founded as a castrum or Roman fort with the name Deva Victrix. The fortress is built by Legio II Adiutrix and contains barracks, granaries, military baths and headquarters.
  - Mamucium (the first Manchester) is founded as a frontier fort and settlement in the North West of England, a distance to the north of Chester.
  - Agricola enters Caledonia (modern-day Scotland) but is resisted by the natives.

====== China ======
- A commission of scholars canonizes the text of works of Confucius and his school.

== Significant people ==
- Titus Flavius Vespasianus, Roman Emperor (Vespasian, AD 69–79)
- Titus Flavius Vespasianus, Roman Emperor (Titus, AD 79–81)

== Births ==
AD 70

- Demonax, Greek Cynic philosopher (approximate date)
- Gaius Julius Quadratus Bassus, Roman politician (d. AD 117)
- Marinus of Tyre, Greek geographer and writer (d. AD 130)
- Menelaus of Alexandria, Greek mathematician (d. AD 140)

AD 71

- Chadae, Korean king of Goguryeo (d. 165)

AD 72

- Julia Balbilla, princess of Commagene

AD 73

- Titus Flavius Hyrcanus, Roman aristocrat

AD 74

- March 18 – Hyginus, bishop of Rome

AD 75

- Suetonius, Roman historian (approximate date) (d. c. 122)
- Gaius Julius Alexander Berenicianus, Cilician prince (d. 150)

AD 76

- January 24 – Hadrian, Roman emperor (d. 138)

AD 78

- Liu Qing, Chinese prince of the Han Dynasty (d. 106)
- Wang Fu, Chinese historian, poet and philosopher (approximate date)
- Zhang Heng, Chinese mathematician, astronomer, inventor, and statesman (d. 139)

AD 79

- He of Han, Chinese emperor (d. 106)
- Ma Rong, Chinese poet and politician (d. 166)

== Deaths ==
AD 70

- Eleazar ben Simon, Jewish leader of the Zealots
- Gaius Dillius Vocula, Roman general (murdered)
- Hero of Alexandria, Greek mathematician and engineer
- Lucius Calpurnius Piso, Roman consul and governor
- Lucius Junius Moderatus Columella, Roman writer
- Malichus II, Roman client king of Nabatea
- Phannias ben Samuel, high priest of Israel
- Simeon ben Gamliel, Jewish leader (nasi)
- Simon bar Giora, Jewish leader (executed)
- Emperor Suinin of Japan, according to legend.

AD 71

- Liu Ying, Chinese prince of the Han Dynasty who converted to Buddhism

AD 72

- July 3 – Thomas the Apostle, Christian preacher and martyr (according to Roman Catholic tradition)

AD 74

- Caenis, Roman slave and secretary of Antonia Minor (mother of Emperor Claudius) and mistress of Emperor Vespasian
- Polemon II, prince of the Bosporan Kingdom, Pontus, Cilicia and Cappadocia

AD 75

- Chen Mu, Chinese governor and general
- Guo Xun, Chinese general
- Han Mingdi, Chinese emperor of the Han dynasty (b. AD 28)

AD 76

- Linus, pope of the Catholic Church (approximate date)
- Marcus Vettius Bolanus, Roman politician and governor (b. 33 AD)
- Nicanor the Deacon, Greek missionary and martyr
- Quintus Asconius Pedianus, Roman historian (b. 9 BC)

AD 77

- Daru of Baekje, Korean king

AD 78

- Gaius Salonius Matidius Patruinus, Roman politician
- Vologases I, king of the Parthian Empire

AD 79

- June 24 – Vespasian, Roman emperor (b. AD 9)
- August 16 – Ma, Chinese empress of the Han Dynasty (b. AD 40)
- August 25 – Caesius Bassus, Roman poet (died in the eruption of Mount Vesuvius)
- August 25 – Drusilla, daughter of Herod (died in the eruption of Vesuvius)
- August 25 – Pliny the Elder, Roman writer and scientist (b. AD 23)
- Apollinaris of Ravenna, Syrian bishop and martyr (approximate date)
- Aulus Caecina Alienus, Roman general and politician (executed)
- Tiberius Claudius Balbilus, Roman politician and astrologer (b. AD 3)
- Titus Clodius Eprius Marcellus, Roman politician (committed suicide)
