= AD 70 =

AD 70 in various calendars
- Gregorian calendar: AD 70; LXX
- Ab urbe condita: 823
- Assyrian calendar: 4820
- Balinese saka calendar: N/A
- Bengali calendar: −524 – −523
- Berber calendar: 1020
- Buddhist calendar: 614
- Burmese calendar: −568
- Byzantine calendar: 5578–5579
- Chinese calendar: 己巳年 (Earth Snake); 2767 or 2560 — to — 庚午年 (Metal Horse); 2768 or 2561
- Coptic calendar: −214 – −213
- Discordian calendar: 1236
- Ethiopian calendar: 62–63
- Hebrew calendar: 3830–3831
- Hindu calendars
- Vikram Samvat: 126–127
- Shaka Samvat: N/A
- Kali Yuga: 3170–3171
- Holocene calendar: 10070
- Iranian calendar: 552 BP – 551 BP
- Islamic calendar: 569 BH – 568 BH
- Javanese calendar: N/A
- Julian calendar: AD 70; LXX
- Korean calendar: 2403
- Minguo calendar: 1842 before ROC 民前1842年
- Nanakshahi calendar: −1398
- Seleucid era: 381/382 AG
- Thai solar calendar: 612–613
- Tibetan calendar: ས་མོ་སྦྲུལ་ལོ་ (female Earth-Snake); 196 or −185 or −957 — to — ལྕགས་ཕོ་རྟ་ལོ་ (male Iron-Horse); 197 or −184 or −956

AD 70 (LXX) was a common year starting on Monday of the Julian calendar. At the time, it was known as the Year of the Consulship of Vespasian and Titus (or, less frequently, year 823 Ab urbe condita). The denomination AD 70 for this year has been used since the early medieval period, when the Anno Domini calendar era became the prevalent method in Europe for naming years.

== Events ==
=== By place ===
==== Roman Empire ====
- Emperor Vespasian and his son Caesar Vespasian (the future Emperor Titus) become Roman consuls.
- Panic strikes Rome as adverse winds delay grain shipments from Africa and Egypt, producing a bread shortage. Ships laden with wheat from North Africa sail 300 miles to Rome's port of Ostia in 3 days, and the 1,000 mile voyage from Alexandria averages 13 days. The vessels often carry 1,000 tons each to provide the city with the 8,000 tons per week it normally consumes.
- Sextus Julius Frontinus is praetor of Rome. Legio II Adiutrix is created from marines of Classis Ravennatis.
- Pliny the Elder serves as procurator in Gallia Narbonensis.
- 14th of Xanthikos (14th of Nisan, about April 14) – Siege of Jerusalem: Titus surrounds the Jewish capital, with three legions (V Macedonica, XII Fulminata and XV Apollinaris) on the western side and a fourth (X Fretensis) on the Mount of Olives to the east. He puts pressure on the food and water supplies of the inhabitants by allowing pilgrims to enter the city to celebrate Passover and then refusing them egress.
- About April 21 – Titus opens a full-scale assault on Jerusalem, concentrating his attack on the city's Third Wall (HaHoma HaShlishit) to the northwest. The Roman army begins trying to breach the wall using testudos, mantlets, siege towers, and battering rams.
- 7th of Artemisios (7th of Iyar, about May 6) – The Third Wall of Jerusalem collapses and the Jews withdraw from Bezetha to the Second Wall, where the defences are unorganized.
- 12th of Artemisios (12th of Iyar, about May 11) – Titus and his Roman legions breach the Second Wall of Jerusalem. The Jewish defenders retreat to the First Wall. The Romans start building a circumvallation; all trees within 90 stadia (ca. fifteen kilometres) of the city are cut down.
- 21st of Artemisios (about May 20 or 21) – A "certain prodigious and incredible phenomenon", "chariots and troops" seen running in the clouds around Jerusalem
- Pentecost (Shavuot, 6th of Sivan, about June 4) – Priests in the Temple in Jerusalem feel a quaking and hear "a sound as of a great multitude saying, Let us remove hence".
- 17th of Panemos (17th of Tammuz), about July 14) – Sacrifices cease in the temple.
- 24th of Panemos (about July 20) – Romans set fire to a cloister after the capture of the Fortress of Antonia, north of the Temple Mount. The Romans are drawn into street fighting with the Zealots.
- 10th of Loios (9th or 10th of Av, about August 4) – Titus destroys the Jewish Temple in Jerusalem. Roman troops are stationed in Jerusalem and abolish the Jewish high priesthood and Sanhedrin. This becomes known as the Fall of Jerusalem, a conclusive event in the First Jewish–Roman War (the Jewish Revolt), which began in 66 AD. Following this event, the Jewish religious leadership moves from Jerusalem to Jamnia (present-day Yavne), and this date is mourned annually as the Jewish fast of Tisha B'Av.
- August – Titus captures Jerusalem.
- 8th of Gorpiaios (8th of Elul, about September 2) – Romans gain control of all of Jerusalem and proceed to burn it and kill its remaining residents, except for some who are taken captive to be killed later or enslaved.
- Neapolis (present-day Nablus) is founded in Iudaea Province.
- Naval clashes on the Rhine during the Batavian Revolt; the crew of a captured Roman flagship is imprisoned at Augusta Treverorum (modern Trier).
- Roman legions V Alaudae and XV Primigenia are destroyed by the Batavi. Later, Quintus Petillius Cerialis puts down the Batavian rebellion of Gaius Julius Civilis.
- Vespasian disbands four Rhine legions (I Germanica, IV Macedonica, XV Primigenia and XVI Gallica), disgraced for having surrendered or lost their eagles during the revolt of Julius Civilis.
- Later Roman emperor Domitian marries Domitia Longina.
- Romans make a punitive expedition against the Garamantes – they are forced to have an official relationship with the Roman Empire.
- Annexation of the island of Samothrace by the Roman Empire under Vespasian.

==== Asia ====
- India sees the end of the Hellenistic dynasties.
- A flood in the yellow river returns the river north of Shandong, to essentially its present course

==== Africa ====
- Expedition by the Roman Septimius Flaccus to southern Egypt. He probably reaches Sudan.
- Ze-Hakèlé (Zoskales in Greek) becomes king of Aksum.

=== By topic ===
==== Religion ====
- Following the destruction of Jerusalem, the Sanhedrin moved to Jamnia.
- Members of the Oneida Community, a now non-existent religious group formed in the 19th century, believed this was the year Jesus Christ returned.

== Births ==
- Demonax, Greek Cynic philosopher (approximate date)
- Gaius Julius Quadratus Bassus, Roman politician (d. AD 117)
- Marinus of Tyre, Greek geographer and writer (d. AD 130)
- Menelaus of Alexandria, Greek mathematician (d. AD 140)

== Deaths ==
- Eleazar ben Simon, Jewish leader of the Zealots
- Gaius Dillius Vocula, Roman general (murdered)
- Hero of Alexandria, Greek mathematician and engineer
- Lucius Calpurnius Piso, Roman consul and governor
- Lucius Junius Moderatus Columella, Roman writer
- Malichus II, Roman client king of Nabatea
- Phannias ben Samuel, high priest of Israel
- Simeon ben Gamliel, Jewish leader (nasi)
- Emperor Suinin of Japan, according to legend.
