= Julius Classicus =

1st century AD Gaulish nobleman and military commander

Julius Classicus was a Treviri nobleman and military commander of the 1st century AD. He served as a commander of the Roman auxiliaries. Along with Julius Tutor, another Treviran Roman auxiliary commander, and Julius Sabinus, who claimed descent from Gaius Julius Caesar, he joined the rebellion of Gaius Julius Civilis during the disorder of the Year of the Four Emperors (69 AD).

== Background ==
In order to secure his position as Roman Emperor, Vespasian, along with his allies Antonius Primus and Mucianus, decided to stir up trouble in Germany so as to distract Vitellius, the current Roman Emperor. A letter was sent to a Batavian chieftain, Julius Civilis, encouraging him to start a rebellion. Liking the idea, Civilis revolted and began to harry Gallia Lugdunensis.

== The revolt ==
Classicus was specifically the commander of the Treviran cavalry regiment and exchanged many letters with Civilis. In these letters Classicus was an accomplice in rebellion with Civilis against Rome, and boasted that he had more ancestors who had been enemies of Rome than friends.

Classicus, along with Sabinus and Tutor, were leaders of the Treviri and Lingones, both Gallic tribes, and had separate ideals from Civilis and his Batavian revolt. The Batavians were seeking little more than tribal independence, while Sabinus and his allies were looking to start a new Roman Empire in Gaul, an Imperium Galliarum. After killing a deserter named Vocula, who had tried to escape after seeing the treachery of Classicus and the rest, Julius Classicus read an oath of allegiance (dressed as a Roman general) to Legio I Germanica and Legio XVI Gallica stationed in Germany, commanding them to swear allegiance to their new emperor, Julius Sabinus (who would have been the 5th Emperor in just a little over a year).

After this oath, Classicus tried to lure Munius Lupercus and his garrison at Xanten into surrender by offering them quarter, but Lupercus declined. Soon after, the army left for Trier and Sabinus went on to lose a battle to the Sequani after squandering his troop resources, mainly because he didn't trust his new legions. According to Tacitus, Classicus spent the critical juncture after this defeat in idleness. After Tutor was defeated in a further battle, Classicus and Civilis fell back in panic.

== Aftermath ==
Vespasian, now emperor, was ready to clean up the mess that the civil war had created. He dispatched an army led by his close ally Petilius Cerialis. As Cerialis advanced on Augusta Treverorum, capital of the Treviri, Classicus and Civilis tried to sow panic in the Roman army by alleging Vespasian had died. Cerialis, however, in a series of battles defeated the uprising and accepted the surrender of Civilis. In the aftermath, Classicus fled with Julius Tutor on a small ship.

== Significance ==
After this revolt, Vespasian decided that for further safety, auxiliary troops would be stationed in different parts of the empire from their origins, and would have a commander that was not of the same native land, further ensuring that no local revolts could ever take place again.

== Sources ==
- Penguin Dictionary of Ancient History
- Cornelius Tacitus (c. 105), Histories.
