= AD 71 =

AD 71 in various calendars
- Gregorian calendar: AD 71; LXXI
- Ab urbe condita: 824
- Assyrian calendar: 4821
- Balinese saka calendar: N/A
- Bengali calendar: −523 – −522
- Berber calendar: 1021
- Buddhist calendar: 615
- Burmese calendar: −567
- Byzantine calendar: 5579–5580
- Chinese calendar: 庚午年 (Metal Horse); 2768 or 2561 — to — 辛未年 (Metal Goat); 2769 or 2562
- Coptic calendar: −213 – −212
- Discordian calendar: 1237
- Ethiopian calendar: 63–64
- Hebrew calendar: 3831–3832
- Hindu calendars
- Vikram Samvat: 127–128
- Shaka Samvat: N/A
- Kali Yuga: 3171–3172
- Holocene calendar: 10071
- Iranian calendar: 551 BP – 550 BP
- Islamic calendar: 568 BH – 567 BH
- Javanese calendar: N/A
- Julian calendar: AD 71; LXXI
- Korean calendar: 2404
- Minguo calendar: 1841 before ROC 民前1841年
- Nanakshahi calendar: −1397
- Seleucid era: 382/383 AG
- Thai solar calendar: 613–614
- Tibetan calendar: ལྕགས་ཕོ་རྟ་ལོ་ (male Iron-Horse); 197 or −184 or −956 — to — ལྕགས་མོ་ལུག་ལོ་ (female Iron-Sheep); 198 or −183 or −955

AD 71 (LXXI) was a common year starting on Tuesday of the Julian calendar. At the time, it was known as the Year of the Consulship of Vespasian and Nerva (or, less frequently, year 824 Ab urbe condita). The denomination AD 71 for this year has been used since the early medieval period, when the Anno Domini calendar era became the prevalent method in Europe for naming years.

== Events ==
=== By place ===
==== Roman Empire ====
- The Romans establish a fortress at York (Eboracum), as a base for their northern forces. Initially established solely for Legio IX Hispana, it expands later to include public housing, baths and temples.
- Battle of Stanwick: Quintus Petillius Cerialis, governor of Britain, puts down a revolt by the Brigantes.
- Emperors Vespasian and Marcus Cocceius Nerva are Roman Consuls.
- Battle of Treves: Cerialis defeats Claudius Civilis, thus quelling the Batavian rebellion.
- Titus is awarded with a triumph, accompanied by Vespasian and his brother Titus Flavius Domitian. In the parade are Jewish prisoners and treasures of the Temple of Jerusalem, including the Menorah and the Pentateuch. The leader of the Zealots, Simon Bar Giora, is lashed and strangled in the Forum.
- Titus is made praetorian prefect of the Praetorian Guard and receives pro-consular command and also tribunician power, all of which indicates that Vespasian will follow the hereditary tradition of succession.
- Herodium, a Jewish fortress south of Jerusalem, is conquered and destroyed by Legio X Fretensis on their way to Masada.
- Doncaster is founded by Roman settlers. The area was originally known as Danum.

==== Asia ====
- Reign of Rabel II, king of Nabataea. He makes Bostra, Syria, his second capital.

=== By topic ===
==== Religion ====
- Mithraism begins to spread throughout the Roman Empire.

== Births ==
- Chadae, Korean king of Goguryeo (d. 165)

== Deaths ==
- Liu Ying, Chinese prince of the Han dynasty who converted to Buddhism
- Simon bar Giora, Jewish leader (executed)
