= Stanwick =

Stanwick or Stanwyck may refer to:

== Places in England ==
- Stanwick, Northamptonshire, a village and civil parish
- Stanwick St John, North Yorkshire, a village, civil parish, former manor and ecclesiastical parish
  - Stanwick Iron Age Fortifications, otherwise known as "Stanwick Camp", North Yorkshire
- Stanwick Hall (disambiguation)

== People ==
- Barbara Stanwyck (1907–1990), American actress
- Leslie Stanwyck, a member of Universal Honey and former member of The Pursuit of Happiness, Canadian bands
- Steele Stanwick (born 1989), American collegiate and Major League Lacrosse player

== Fictional characters ==
- Alan Stanwyck, villain of the 1974 novel Fletch by Gregory Mcdonald
- Carole Stanwyck, one of the two protagonists of Partners in Crime, an American TV series
- Suzanne Stanwyck, a character in the soap opera General Hospital from 2010 to 2011

== Other uses ==
- Battle of Stanwick, a Roman victory in 71 AD in northern England

== See also ==
- Stanwix
- Swanwick (disambiguation)
