= Helvia gens =

Ancient Roman family

The gens Helvia was a plebeian family at ancient Rome. This gens is first mentioned at the time of the Second Punic War, but the only member of the family to hold any curule magistracy under the Republic was Gaius Helvius, praetor in BC 198. Soon afterward, the family slipped into obscurity, from which it was redeemed by the emperor Pertinax, nearly four centuries later.

== Praenomina ==
The Helvii of the Republic are known to have used the praenomina Gnaeus, Gaius, and Marcus. In imperial times we also find Lucius and Publius. All of these were amongst the most common praenomina throughout all periods of Roman history.

== Branches and cognomina ==
The surnames of the Helvii under the Republic included Blasio, Cinna, and Mancia, but several of the family appear without a cognomen. Under the Empire, a number of Helvii are found with the surname Rufus, but it is not apparent whether they constituted a distinct family of the Helvia gens.

== Members ==
This list includes abbreviated praenomina. For an explanation of this practice, see filiation.

- Gnaeus Helvius, a military tribune who was slain in battle against the Gauls and Carthaginians near Mediolanum in 203 BC.
- Gaius Helvius, praetor in BC 198, with Cato the Elder, his colleague as plebeian aedile the previous year. He accompanied the consul Sextus Aelius Paetus into Cisalpine Gaul, and received command of one of the consul's armies. Nine years later, in 189, he was legate to the consul Gnaeus Manlius Vulso in Galatia.
- Marcus Helvius Blasio, plebeian aedile in BC 198, and praetor in 197, assigned the province of Hispania Ulterior. On his return home in 195, he was attacked by an army of 20,000 Celtiberi near the town of Illiturgi in Hispania Citerior; his guard of 6,000 defeated the Celtiberi and took the town. He was awarded an ovation, and in 194 was one of the commissioners for founding the colony of Sipontum in Apulia.
- Helvius Mancia, an orator of some cleverness, whose poor appearance was mocked by either Gaius Julius Caesar Strabo, with whom he was engaged in a lawsuit, or (according to Pliny), by Lucius Licinius Crassus, the orator, about 90 BC.
- Helvius Blasio, a friend of Decimus Junius Brutus Albinus, for whom he tried to set an example by taking his own life, when Brutus was captured by his enemies.
- Gaius Helvius Cinna, a celebrated poet, friend of Catullus, and tribune of the plebs in 44 BC. He was lynched at Julius Caesar's funeral after being mistaken, on account of his name, for the praetor Lucius Cornelius Cinna, who had just delivered an incendiary speech in support of the dictator's assassins.
- Marcus Helvius Rufus, a soldier who was recognized for his bravery in battle against Tacfarinas. He might be the same person as Marcus Helvius Rufus Civica.
- Marcus Helvius M. f. Rufus Civica, a centurion primus pilus, named in a dedicatory inscription from Varia in Latium, dating from the reign of Tiberius.
- Helvia, the wife of Seneca the Elder, and mother of Seneca the Younger.
- Marcus Helvius Geminus, raised to the patriciate by Claudius, was governor of Macedonia, and proconsular legate of Asia.
- Lucius Helvius Agrippa, proconsular governor of Sardinia from AD 68 to 69.
- Helvia Procula, the wife of Gaius Dillius Vocula, commander of the twenty-second legion. When her husband was slain during the Batavian rebellion in AD 70, Helvia dedicated a monument at Rome commemorating his military and political career.
- Gnaeus Helvius Sabinus, a candidate for aedile of Pompeii shortly before the eruption of Mount Vesuvius in AD 79. Over one hundred notices for his election have been found.
- Helvius Successus, father of the emperor Pertinax, was a freedman, who worked as a wool merchant and charcoal-burner at Alba Pompeia.
- Marcus Helvius Clemens Dextrianus, equestrian governor of Raetia during the reign of Commodus.
- Publius Helvius Pertinax, emperor from January to March, AD 193. After an illustrious military and political career, he was proclaimed emperor following the murder of Commodus, and embarked upon a series of reforms; but in his haste he quickly made enemies, and was soon dispatched by the Praetorian Guard.
- Publius Helvius P.f. Pertinax, son of the emperor

== See also ==
- List of Roman gentes

== Bibliography ==
- Polybius, Historiae (The Histories).
- Fasti Triumphales.
- Marcus Tullius Cicero, De Oratore.
- Gaius Valerius Catullus Carmina.
- Titus Livius (Livy), Ab Urbe Condita (History of Rome).
- Publius Ovidius Naso (Ovid), Ibis.
- Valerius Maximus, Factorum ac Dictorum Memorabilium (Memorable Facts and Sayings).
- Lucius Annaeus Seneca (Seneca the Younger), De Consolatione ad Helviam.
- Publius Cornelius Tacitus, Annales.
- Plutarchus, Lives of the Noble Greeks and Romans.
- Gaius Plinius Secundus (Pliny the Elder), Naturalis Historia (Natural History).
- Appianus Alexandrinus (Appian), Bellum Civile (The Civil War).
- Marcus Fabius Quintilianus (Quintilian), Institutio Oratoria.
- Gaius Suetonius Tranquillus (Suetonius), De Vita Caesarum (Lives of the Caesars, or The Twelve Caesars).
- Lucius Cassius Dio Cocceianus (Cassius Dio), Roman History.
- Dictionary of Greek and Roman Biography and Mythology, William Smith (ed.), John Murray, London (1849).
- Theodor Mommsen et alii, Corpus Inscriptionum Latinarum (The Body of Latin Inscriptions, abbreviated CIL), Berlin-Brandenburgische Akademie der Wissenschaften (1853–present).
- Paul von Rohden, Elimar Klebs, & Hermann Dessau, Prosopographia Imperii Romani (The Prosopography of the Roman Empire, abbreviated PIR), Berlin (1898).
- T. Robert S. Broughton, The Magistrates of the Roman Republic, American Philological Association (1952).
- Edward Courtney (ed.), The Fragmentary Latin Poets, Oxford University Press (1993), ISBN 0-19-814775-9.
- Alison E. Cooley and M.G.L. Cooley, Pompeii and Herculaneum: A Sourcebook, 2nd ed., Routledge, London (2014).
