= Nabalia =

Ancient river in The Netherlands

Nabalia is an ancient river in the Netherlands that has been mentioned once by the Roman historian Tacitus, in his Histories (5:26).

The river must have had some local, strategic or religious meaning, for in 70 AD Julius Civilis, leader of the Batavian rebellion against the Romans, choose this location to negotiate peace. A bridge was built, where the warring parties approached each other from both sides. Although Tacitus attributed a speech made here to the Roman captain Ceriales, he did not include the speech itself, and so the peace treaty's conditions are lost in the fog of time. However, the Batavians were still thought of as an important tribe to the Romans in Tacitus's later book Germania (98 AD). There are no indications of a harsh retaliation, and the Batavians continued in their privileged position of semi-independence in return for supplying elite troops to the Roman Empire.

The identification of this river has not been resolved, also due to considerable changes of the historic watercourses. The name does not give any clue and, obviously cognate with Dutch nevel and German Nebel, both ‘fog’, and derived from Proto-Indo-European *nebʰ- ‘sky, cloud’, would be a trivial synonym for any river. Proposed are the rivers Utrechtse Vecht and Hollandse IJssel.
