= Xanthika =

Ancient Macedonian festival

Xanthika or Xandika was an ancient Macedonian annual festival, shortly before the vernal equinox, in the month Xanthikos, containing a spring purification march of the army between the two halves of a sacrificed dog, which is associated with the assimilation of the new year's ephebes into the army. According to a fragment of Polybius 23.10 they make offerings to Xanthus as a hero, and perform a purification of the army with horses fully equipped. There was also a Spartan military festival of youths who sacrificed a dog to Enyalius.

== Sources ==
- Polybius, Rome, and the Hellenistic world By Frank William Walbank Page 80 ISBN 0-521-81208-9
- Macedonian Institutions Under the Kings by Miltiades Chatzopoulos pages 276,319 ISBN 960-7094-89-1
