= AD 131 =

131 in various calendars
- Gregorian calendar: 131; CXXXI
- Ab urbe condita: 884
- Assyrian calendar: 4881
- Balinese saka calendar: 52–53
- Bengali calendar: −463 – −462
- Berber calendar: 1081
- Buddhist calendar: 675
- Burmese calendar: −507
- Byzantine calendar: 5639–5640
- Chinese calendar: 庚午年 (Metal Horse); 2828 or 2621 — to — 辛未年 (Metal Goat); 2829 or 2622
- Coptic calendar: −153 – −152
- Discordian calendar: 1297
- Ethiopian calendar: 123–124
- Hebrew calendar: 3891–3892
- Hindu calendars
- Vikram Samvat: 187–188
- Shaka Samvat: 52–53
- Kali Yuga: 3231–3232
- Holocene calendar: 10131
- Iranian calendar: 491 BP – 490 BP
- Islamic calendar: 506 BH – 505 BH
- Javanese calendar: 6–7
- Julian calendar: 131; CXXXI
- Korean calendar: 2464
- Minguo calendar: 1781 before ROC 民前1781年
- Nanakshahi calendar: −1337
- Seleucid era: 442/443 AG
- Thai solar calendar: 673–674
- Tibetan calendar: ལྕགས་ཕོ་རྟ་ལོ་ (male Iron-Horse); 257 or −124 or −896 — to — ལྕགས་མོ་ལུག་ལོ་ (female Iron-Sheep); 258 or −123 or −895

Year 131 (CXXXI) was a common year starting on Sunday of the Julian calendar. At the time, it was known as the Year of the Consulship of Laenas and Rufinus (or, less frequently, year 884 Ab urbe condita). The denomination 131 for this year has been used since the early medieval period, when the Anno Domini calendar era became the prevalent method in Europe for naming years.

== Events ==
=== By place ===
==== Roman Empire ====
- Emperor Hadrian builds the city Aelia Capitolina, on the location of Jerusalem.
- The Praetor's Edict is definitively codified by Salvius Julianus, on Hadrian's orders. This change means that senatorial decrees become a mere confirmation of the imperial speech (oratio principis) which initiated them.
- Reorganization of the Imperial Council: Central administration is reinforced, and administrative positions are entrusted to knights, according to a very strict hierarchy. Under the reorganization, the Roman Senate is excluded from controlling the business of state.
- Hadrian restores the monarchist policy of Claudius and Domitian. The equestrian order is given full legal status, and attains the second order of the state.
- Italy is divided into legal districts managed by consuls, a direct blow to the power and prestige of the Senate.

=== By topic ===
==== Religion ====
- The Edict of Hadrian prohibits the practice of circumcision. Additionally, Hadrian prohibits public reading of the Torah under penalty of death, as well as observance of festivals and the Sabbath, the teaching of Judaic Law, and the ordination of rabbis.
- The Temple of Baalshamin is built in Palmyra.

== Deaths ==
- Joshua ben Hananiah, leading Jewish tanna
