= Legio XXI Rapax =

Roman legion

- Active: 31 B.C. – 92 A.D.
- Country: Roman Empire
- Type: Infantry assault (some cavalry support)
- Garrison/HQ: Castra Regina (Regensburg); Castra Vetera (Xanten); Vindonissa; Moguntiacum (Mainz)
- Engagements: Cantabrian Wars; Year of the Four Emperors

Commanders
- Notable commanders: Vitellius

Legio XXI Rapax ("Predator, Twenty-First Legion") was a legion of the Imperial Roman army. The symbol of the legion is thought to have been a capricorn.

== History ==
=== Foundation ===
It was founded in 31 BC by the emperor Augustus (r. 27 BC – AD 14), probably from men previously enlisted in other legions.

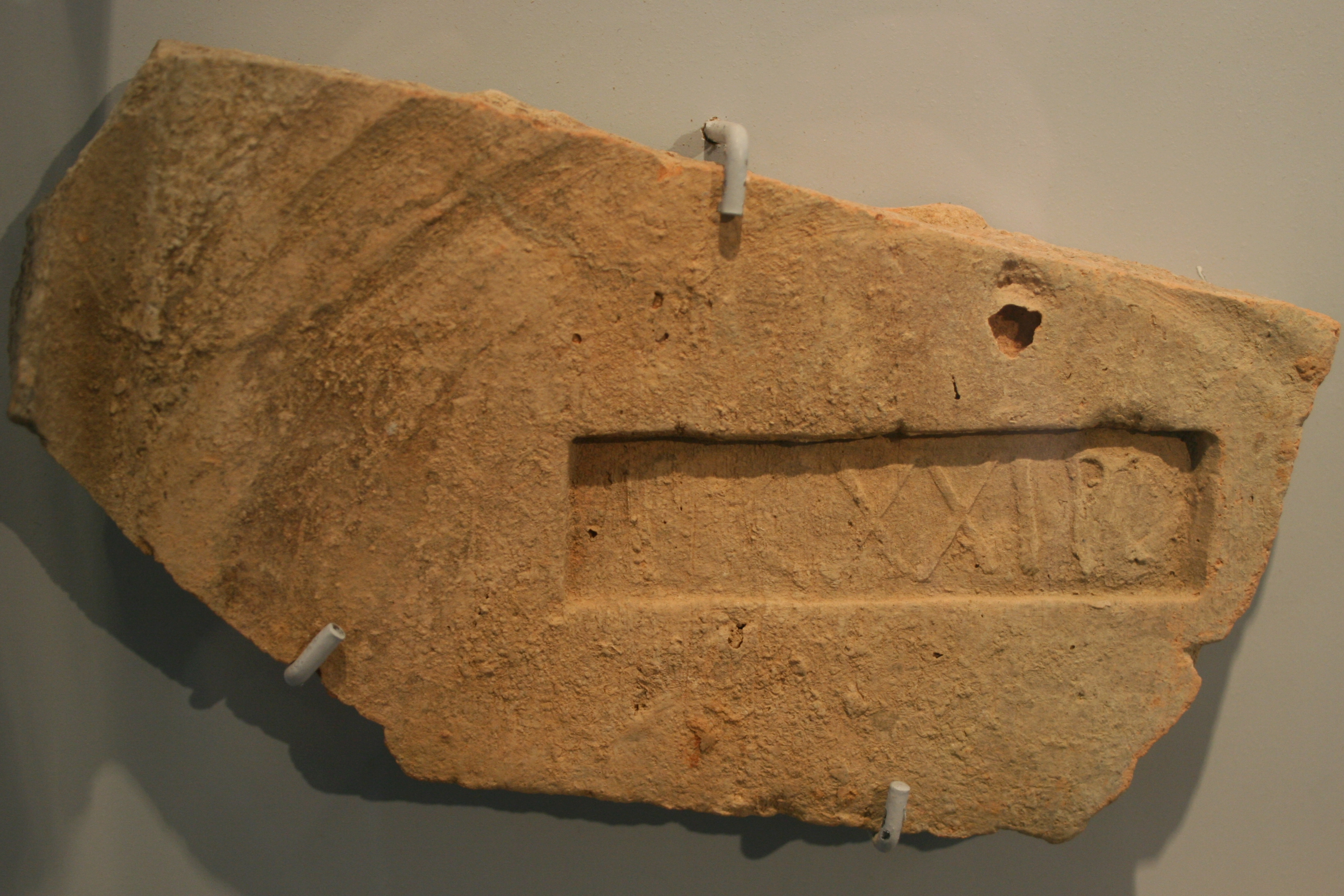
Brick stamp LEG XXIR, found in Rheinzabern.

Augustus probably sent his new XXIst legion to Hispania Tarraconensis to fight the campaign against the Cantabrians. XXI Rapax was one of the five legions used by Drusus to suppress the rebellion of the Raetians, in 16–15 BC. From 15 BC, the legion was stationed in Castra Regina (Regensburg), in the new province of Raetia.

=== After Teutoburg ===
After the disaster of the Battle of the Teutoburg Forest, the legion was sent as reinforcements to Germania Inferior, where they shared the base camp of Castra Vetera (Xanten) with V Alaudae. Both Legio V and Legio XXI were involved in a mutiny in AD 14. In 43, they were relocated in Vindonissa (Windisch), in the province of Germania Superior.

The legion occupied Vindonissa from 46 to 69 with two auxiliary cohorts, first the III Hispanorum and VI Raetorum, and later the VII Raetorum equitata and the XXVI voluntariorum civium Romanorum.

Along with the rest of the German border army, the XXI Rapax supported its commander, Vitellius, in the Year of the Four Emperors (69) and defeated Othonian forces at the First Battle of Bedriacum. Vitellius was, however, defeated by Vespasian before the end of the year.

In 70, the legion was part of the army sent to deal with the Batavian rebellion and relieve the four legions imprisoned by Civilis. After that they were sent to Germania Superior, where they shared the castrum (camp) of Moguntiacum (modern day Mainz) with XIV Gemina.

In 89, the legions in Moguntiacum supported their commander, Lucius Antonius Saturninus, in his revolt against emperor Domitian. After the end of this unsuccessful insurrection, the legions were separated and XXI Rapax sent to Pannonia.

=== Destruction ===
This legion disappears from the historical record in the 90s. One theory is that it was disbanded as a result of its participation in the revolt of Lucius Antonius Saturninus in January 89. Another theory holds that it was destroyed during Domitian's campaign against the Sarmatians in the 90s. A third theory is that the legion mutinied at the time of the uprising of the Praetorians against Nerva in the year 97, and was disbanded afterwards. Bernard Rémy prefers the first possibility, that the legion had dishonored itself, noting that the name of the legion has been excised from several inscriptions at Vindonissa, a common indication of damnatio memoriae.

== See also ==
- List of Roman legions
