= Legio XV Primigenia =

Roman legion

Legio XV Primigenia (Fortune's Fifteenth Legion") was a legion of the Imperial Roman army. Primigena ("firstborn") was one of the nicknames accorded to the Roman goddess Fortuna. Primigenia is an adjective, meaning "of Primigena".

It was originally levied by the emperor Caligula in 39 AD, to aid in the Germanic campaigns and was stationed in the Rhine frontier until 70, when it was destroyed during the Batavian rebellion.

== Deployment ==
After its initial campaigns (along the Rhine), XV Primigenia was stationed in Moguntiacum (Mainz). In 43, the redeployment of units following the Roman invasion of Britain leads the XV Primigenia to Xanten, in a camp shared with the V Alaude. In 47 both legions were involved in the war against the Frisians and in the construction of Corbulo's canal in the Rhine.

During the Year of the Four Emperors (68–69), XV Primigenia and the other German border legions supported the claim of Vitellius to the throne, first against Galba and afterwards against Otho. When Vespasian was finally acclaimed undisputed emperor, the legions XV Primigenia and V Alaudae returned to Castra Vetera (Xanten camp), where the Batavian rebellion was already in progress.

== Defeat ==
Both legions were besieged in their winter camp in 69 by a rebel army commanded by Civilis. They finally surrendered in 70 due to hunger and left the camp in orderly fashion under promises of safe conduct. However, the rebels chased the legions and killed the surviving legionaries.

== See also ==
- List of Roman legions
