= Quintus Aurelius Polus Terentianus =

Quintus Aurelius Polus Terentianus was a Roman senator, who held a number of offices in the imperial service. He was suffect consul between the years 188 and 190. Anthony Birley notes, despite the lack of records on Terentianus' origins, "study of the distribution of QQ. Aurelii, and other elements in his nomenclature, suggest he too, like other men in key positions at the end of 192, may have been an African."

The cursus honorum of Terentianus is known only from a number of inscriptions. His earliest recorded activity comes from a pair of fragmentary dedications to various Roman gods he set up at Mainz. The one in the best condition, dedicated to Liber and Apollo, attests that he was legatus legionis or commander of Legio XXII Primigenia, then Legio II Augusta, as well as being one of the fetiales. Senators rarely commanded more than one legion in their career; in compiling a list of all men known to have commanded two or more, Birley identified only 33 men. This only happened in unusual cases, and Birley explains that Terentianus was sent from Mainz, where Legio XXII was stationed, to Roman Britain, where Legio II was stationed, due to unusual circumstances. Either he was to replace the legionary legatus Priscus, one of the commanders of the mutinous British legions; or Terentianus was sent to replace one of the equites appointed by the praetorian prefect Tigidius Perennis, who subsequently fell from power. "At all events, Terentianus ought to have taken up his command in 185 or 186."

Birley suggests Terentianus held one further praetorian post, which was followed by the consulship. He was appointed governor of the imperial province of Roman Dacia probably before the death of Commodus in the year 192; his appointment may have been engineered by the praetorian prefect Quintus Aemilius Laetus, as part of his coup against Commodus. He was governor no later than 195, when the brother of Septimius Severus was appointed to govern the province. Birley notes that, despite indications he was on good terms with Pertinax, Terentianus remained in favor with Septimius Severus, for he was proconsular governor of Asia in the later part of that emperor's reign.
