= Legio I Germanica =

Roman legion

- Active: 48 BC – 70 AD
- Country: Roman Republic and Roman Empire
- Type: Roman legion (Marian)
- Role: Infantry assault (some cavalry support)
- Size: Varied over unit lifetime. Approx. 3,500 fighting men + support at the time of creation.
- Garrison/HQ: Hispania Tarraconensis (30 – 16 BC); Germania Inferior (beginning 1st century – 69 AD)
- Nicknames: Germanica, under Augustus
- Mascot: Taurus
- Engagements: Battle of Pharsalus (48 BC); Cantabrian Wars (29 BC–19 BC); Drusus Germanic campaign Revolt of the Batavi (70)

Commanders
- Notable commanders: Julius Caesar (campaign); Drusus (campaign); Fabius Valens (officer); Herennius Gallus (officer)

Legio I Germanica (lit. First Legion "Germanic"), was a legion of the Imperial Roman army, possibly founded in 48 BC by Julius Caesar to fight for him in the civil war against Pompey. The title germanic is a reference to its service in the Germanic Wars, rather than the place of origin of its soldiers. After the Revolt of the Batavi (AD 70), the remaining men of the Germanica were added to Galba's seventh legion, which became VII Gemina. The emblem of Legio I is unknown, but it was probably Taurus, like all the other legions levied by Caesar (except the V Alaudae).

== Origin ==
There are three theories about I Germanica recruitment. The most favored is that it was raised by Julius Caesar in 48 BC to fight in the civil war against Pompey. The Legion first saw action at the Battle of Dyrracchium. In that case it would have fought in the Battle of Pharsalus in 48 BC. Another claim is that the legion was raised by Pompey and it fought against Caesar at Pharsalus, Thaspus, and Munda.

The third theory attributes its recruitment to Gaius Vibius Pansa Caetronianus, a partisan of Caesar, who died in the Battle of Forum Gallorum against Mark Antony in 43 BC. Legio I would have been recruited in that year for that campaign.

However recruited, Legio I was inherited by Augustus and therefore ought to have been entitled to the cognomen Augusta after distinguished service under his eyes; however, there was no Legio I Augusta. That title was stripped after a defeat in the Cantabrian Wars and the loss of its standard to the Astur and Cantabrian peoples.

The legion would fight against Sextus Pompey in Sicilly in 36 BCE. After Augustus lost a battle, he requested the Legio I Germanica as reinforcements.

== Hispania disgrace ==
After the civil war the legion joined the army of Augustus. It is believed to be identical to the Legio I that took part in the Hispania campaign against the Cantabri conducted for Augustus by Marcus Agrippa and was disgraced there. Inscriptions on coins from Hispania indicate that between 30 and 16 BC, some Legio I was stationed in Hispania Tarraconensis, where they would have fought in the war against the Cantabrians and Asturians. Dio Cassius (54.11.5) says that one legion was stripped of its title, Augusta, after suffering reverses in that campaign. The two references are believed to be to the same legion, accounting for its early missing title and emblem. While in Spain they helped build the colonia Acci.

== Distinguished service in Germania ==
Around the turn of the century, Legio I appears on the Rhine frontier. They may have been moved to the Rhine in order to help emperor Tiberius's war against the Vindelicia. The Annales of Tacitus state that they received standards from Tiberius, but when that was is not clear. This statement is problematic because only new or reconstituted legions received standards. Other theories suggest they received the standard after winning a battle near Lake Constance. Because of their service in Germania the legion soon redeemed itself, winning the title Germanica for it. Exactly when they won it is not known. Most likely, the title Germanica was granted for service in Drusus' subsequent punitive and exploratory campaigns against the Germanic tribes. Drusus was extremely popular. It was an honor to be in his service and he made sure that his men were honored properly.

== Mutiny on the Limes Germanicus ==
After the defeat of Varus, Augustus' adoptive son Tiberius (brother of Drusus) assumed command of the army on the Rhine, which was reinforced to eight legions. When Tiberius returned to Italy in 13 AD, Augustus appointed Drusus' son, Germanicus, commander of the eight legions on the Rhine. In the following year Augustus died, Tiberius being his successor.

Subsequently Junius Blaesus, commander of three legions in summer camp in Pannonia, gave the men a holiday. A soldier who had been a claqueur, Percennius, addressed the men on that occasion on the subject of soldier's benefits. They needed a fixed contract, he said, a term of service of 16 seasons instead of 25 or 30, and a pay raise. The speech was far from comic. The men as he spoke began raise a dais of earth around him and brought the standards and that attracted the attention of the Praetor, Blaesus. Unable to dissuade the men, he agreed to send his son, a tribune, to Tiberius with the demands. The men settled down to await the reply.

Word of the mutiny spread to construction crews of the legions in nearby Nauportus. Arresting their commander, Aufidienus Rufus, they forced him to march at the head of the return column carrying heavy baggage and asking him all the while how he liked it. They plundered vici as they went. Arriving in camp they raised a riot. Attempting to quell it, Blaesus had loyal troops throw the rioters in the guardhouse, but they were set free, the tribunes were ejected from camp, and a harsh centurion murdered.

The soldiers were on the point of killing each other when Tiberius' own son, Drusus Julius Caesar arrived in camp with some troops, sealed the gates and proceeded to investigate and settle the mutiny in tribunal. The men rejecting his proposals, he sent them to their tents and sent men to speak to them personally. Gradually the men were recalled to duty. Drusus had the leaders executed and returned to Rome. No action yet was taken on the issues.

The XXI Rapax, V Alaudae, I Germanica and XX Valeria Victrix of the army of Germania Inferior heard of the mutiny at their summer camp among the Ubii. Aroused by new recruits from the city of Rome, the men attacked the centurions by surprise, beating many to death and throwing the bodies into the Rhine. The main command was isolated and the men ran the camp. Hearing of the mutiny, Germanicus left his tax-collecting duties in Gaul and hastened to the camp with a small retinue. He was just as popular as his father had been.

After mingling with the men and hearing their complaints, Germanicus persuaded them into formation, had the standards brought out and began a dialogue with them. At one point they bared their backs to show Germanicus the scars from lashing. At another Germanicus drew his sword and offered to commit suicide, but was restrained. Another soldier offered him a sharper sword. He withdrew to his tent.

There he received word that the mutiny was about to become a state issue. Mutinous envoys were being sent to Cologne, there were plans to burn the city and sack Gaul. The enemy on the other side of the border was watching with interest, waiting to intervene. In realization of the common danger the men settled for immunity, double pay (which Germanicus gladly paid from his own funds on the spot) and an enlistment of sixteen years. I Germanica and the XX Valeria Victrix retired to Cologne, while Germanicus went to seek senatorial confirmation and approval by Tiberius.

Germanicus returned to Cologne with envoys from the Senate, arriving at night, which was misinterpreted by the men as signifying the agreement was off. They dragged Germanicus from his bed, but the matter was clarified next day. Upset, Germanicus tried to send his pregnant wife and young son off to safety, but the soldiers heard them weeping and came out to detain them. Aroused, Germanicus delivered one of the great orations in history, upholding the tradition of his family's ability in that area, saying, for example:

"For what have you not dared, what have you not profaned during these days? What name shall I give to this gathering? Am I to call you soldiers ... when you have trampled under foot the Authority of the Senate? ..." (Annales 1.46 from the Perseus site)

Moved and stung to the quick, the soldiers settled the mutiny on the spot by general court martial conducted by the tribunes. The leaders were put in chains and brought to the dais, where they went before the troops one by one. The soldiers voted for guilt or innocence by voice. The guilty were thrown off the dais to be executed by the men. Each centurion then passed before the tribunal to be approved or disapproved. The approved kept their rank. The disapproved were discharged from the service. The terms of the agreement were faithfully kept. Germanicus returned to Rome.

I Germanica went back to duty, but not exactly with honor. It remained in Germania Inferior fighting in all the major campaigns along the Rhine and the Danube.

After the dissolution of the Cologne fortress the legion was moved to Bonn.

== Gaius Julius Vindex's revolt against Nero ==
During the year 67 AD emperor Nero's position as emperor became unstable. Many senators became discontent with him, and a number of governors discussed his removal. Two of these politicians were Lucius Clodius Macer, governor of Africa and Gaius Julius Vindex, governor of Gallia Lugdunensis. When the governor of Hispania Tarraconensis, Servius Sulpicius Galba, rebelled against Nero, both of them supported him. The Legio I Germanica supported Nero. They defeated Gaius Julius Vindex. However, Galba still became the emperor. Afterwards the Legio I Germanica proclaimed Vitellius, the governor of Germania Inferior as emperor. Vitellius would become emperor. Later he would be deposed by Vespasian.

== Final disgrace and disbandment ==
During the Batavian revolt a Roman expedition was defeated near Nijmegen, and shortly after, two legions were besieged at Xanten. Although the Legio I Germanica, led by Herennius Gallus, XVI Gallica and a legion from Germania Superior, XXII Primigenia, attempted to reinforce them, they were made to surrender in March 70. The two legions who had made an abortive rescue attempt, I Germanica and XVI Gallica later surrendered as well.

It would be several months before emperor Vespasian could muster a strong force, led by Quintus Petillius Cerialis, to restore control over the Rhineland and subdue the Batavian revolt. In the wake of this, the remains of I Germanica were combined with Legio VII Galbiana to become the VII Gemina. The legion was probably disbanded in the year 70.

== Attested members ==
Name	Rank	Time frame	Province	Source
Fabius Valens	legatus legionis	68-69	Germania	Tacitus, Histories I.57
Herennius Gallus	legatus legionis	69-70	Germania	Tacitus, Histories IV.19
Torquatus Novellus Atticus	tribunus laticlavius	before 30	Germania	CIL XIV, 3602 = ILS 950

== See also ==
- List of Roman legions
