= Gaius Dillius Vocula =

Gaius Dillius Vocula (died 70 AD) was a Roman commander of the Legio XXII Primigenia during the Batavian revolt. While defending the legionary camp of Vetera, he was murdered by rebellious Roman troops.

An inscription found at Rome, commissioned by his wife Helvia Procula, provides details of his cursus honorum. His first recorded office was a commission as a military tribune; although the inscription identifies the unit as "Legio I", there were two active c. 60 with that number: Legio I Germanica, and Legio I Minervia. Then came an appointment as a quattuorviri viarum curandarum, one of the four magistracies that comprised the vigintiviri; membership in one of these four was a preliminary and required first step toward a gaining entry into the Roman Senate. Next was the traditional Republican magistracy of quaestor, which he served in the public province of Bithynia and Pontus; upon completion of this magistracy Vocula would be enrolled in the Senate. Two more of the traditional magistracies followed: plebeian tribune and praetor; at some time afterwards he received his commission with the Twenty-second Legion.
