= AD 3 =

AD 3 or AD-3 may refer to:

- A year of the 0s decade in the in the Julian calendar
- Salmson AD.3, an aircraft piston engines of the 1920s
- Adaridi AD 3, a Finnish experimental aircraft of the 1920s
- AD-3, the third production variant of the Douglas AD Skyraider aircraft
- One of the experiments running on the Antiproton Decelerator
- USS Dobbin (AD-3), a US Navy destroyer tender
