= AD 140 =

140 in various calendars
- Gregorian calendar: 140; CXL
- Ab urbe condita: 893
- Assyrian calendar: 4890
- Balinese saka calendar: 61–62
- Bengali calendar: −454 – −453
- Berber calendar: 1090
- Buddhist calendar: 684
- Burmese calendar: −498
- Byzantine calendar: 5648–5649
- Chinese calendar: 己卯年 (Earth Rabbit); 2837 or 2630 — to — 庚辰年 (Metal Dragon); 2838 or 2631
- Coptic calendar: −144 – −143
- Discordian calendar: 1306
- Ethiopian calendar: 132–133
- Hebrew calendar: 3900–3901
- Hindu calendars
- Vikram Samvat: 196–197
- Shaka Samvat: 61–62
- Kali Yuga: 3240–3241
- Holocene calendar: 10140
- Iranian calendar: 482 BP – 481 BP
- Islamic calendar: 497 BH – 496 BH
- Javanese calendar: 15–16
- Julian calendar: 140; CXL
- Korean calendar: 2473
- Minguo calendar: 1772 before ROC 民前1772年
- Nanakshahi calendar: −1328
- Seleucid era: 451/452 AG
- Thai solar calendar: 682–683
- Tibetan calendar: ས་མོ་ཡོས་ལོ་ (female Earth-Hare); 266 or −115 or −887 — to — ལྕགས་ཕོ་འབྲུག་ལོ་ (male Iron-Dragon); 267 or −114 or −886

Year 140 (CXL) was a leap year starting on Thursday of the Julian calendar. At the time, it was known as the Year of the Consulship of Hadrianus and Caesar (or, less frequently, year 893 Ab urbe condita). The denomination 140 for this year has been used since the early medieval period, when the Anno Domini calendar era became the prevalent method in Europe for naming years.

== Events ==
=== By place ===
==== Roman Empire ====
- Emperor Antoninus Augustus Pius and Marcus Aurelius Caesar become Roman Consuls.
- Antoninus Pius recognizes the king of the Quadi, who becomes an ally of Rome.
- The export of olive oil from Hispania Baetica to Rome peaks.

==== Parthian Empire ====
- King Mithridates V dies; Vologases IV claims the throne and extends his rule throughout the Parthian Empire.

=== By topic ===
==== Religion ====
- Pope Pius I succeeds Pope Hyginus as the tenth pope of Rome according to tradition.
- Marcion arrives in Rome, bringing Evangelikon and Apostolikon to the Christian community.

==== Art and science ====
- Ptolemy completes his Almagest (approximate date).

== Births ==
- Ballomar, leader of the Marcomanni (approximate date)
- Zhang Jiao, leader of the Yellow Turban Rebellion (d. 184)

== Deaths ==
- Faustina the Elder, Roman empress (b. 100 AD)
- Gaius Bruttius Praesens Lucius Fulvius Rusticus, Roman politician (b. AD 68)
- Menelaus of Alexandria, Greek mathematician (b. AD 70)
- Mithridates V, king of the Parthian Empire
