= Stanwick Hall =

Stanwick Hall may refer to:

- Stanwick Park in Yorkshire, a demolished country house
- Stanwick Hall, Northamptonshire a Georgian mansion house
