= Legio XXII Primigenia =

Roman legion

Map of the Roman Empire in AD 125, under emperor Hadrian, showing the Legio XXII Primigenia, stationed on the river Rhine at Moguntiacum (Mainz, Germany), in Germania Superior province, from AD 39 until the 4th century

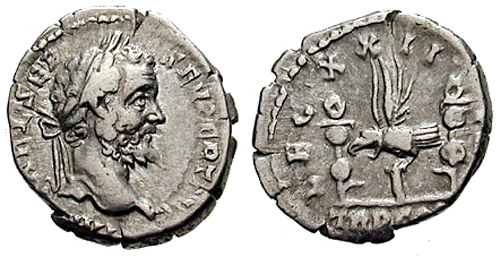
This denarius, struck in 193 under Septimius Severus, celebrates XXII Primigenia, one of the legions which supported the commander of the Pannonian army in his bid for purple

Legio XXII Primigenia ("Fortune's Twenty-Second Legion") was a legion of the Imperial Roman army dedicated to the goddess Fortuna Primigenia. Founded in AD 39 by the emperor Caligula for use in his campaigns in Germania, the XXII Primigenia spent much of their time in Mogontiacum (modern Mainz) up to the end of the 3rd century. The legion's symbols were a Capricorn and the demigod Hercules.

== History ==
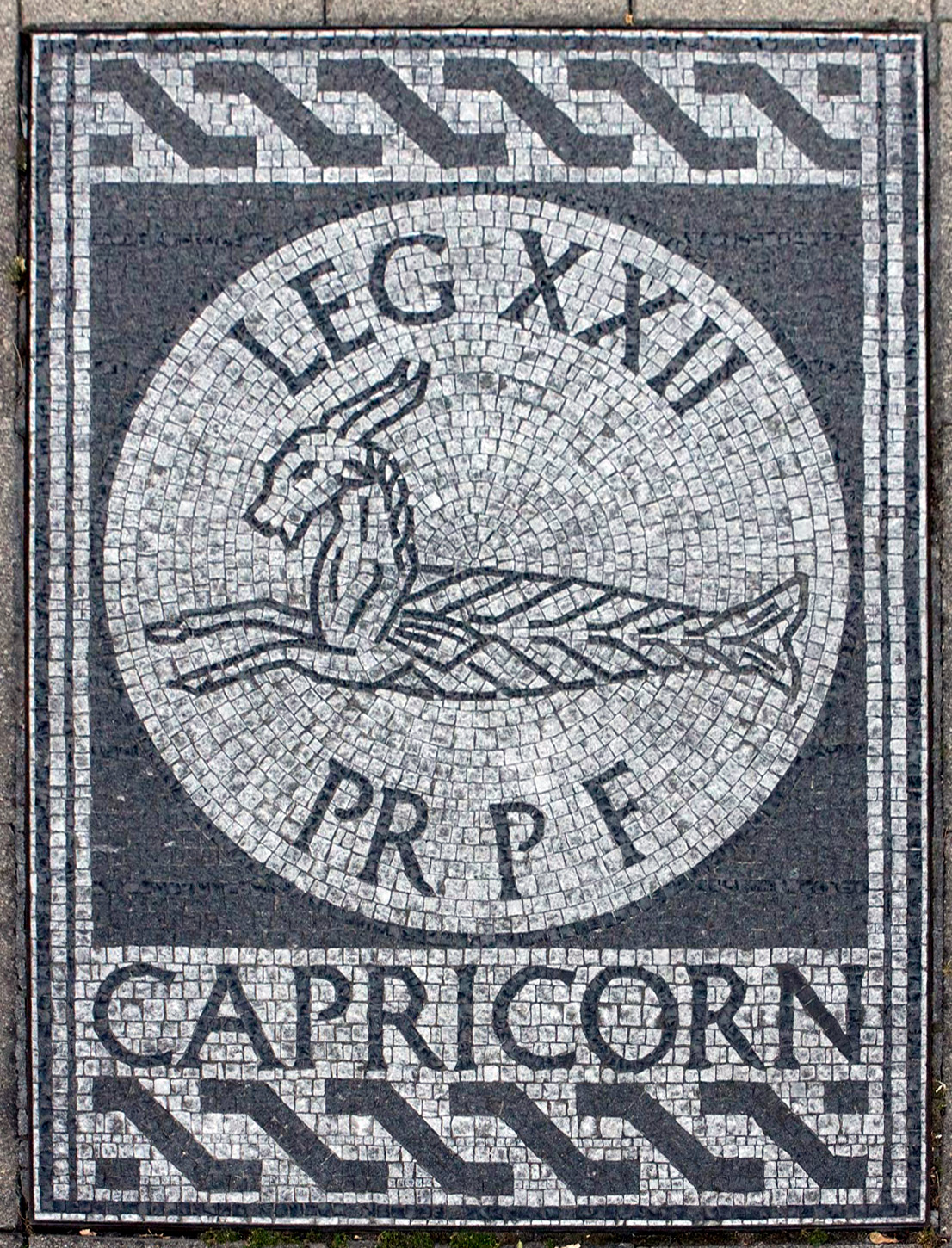
Mosaic with the legion's Capricorn motif

XXII Primigenia was first stationed in Mogontiacum in the Roman province of Germania Superior, guarding the Rhine border as part of the limes. Along with the rest of the Germanic army, the legion supported Vitellius in the Year of the Four Emperors (69). During the Batavian rebellion, XXII Primigenia, commanded by Gaius Dillius Vocula, was the only Germanic legion that survived rebel attacks and which stayed in its camp, defending Moguntiacum. They remained in Moguntiacum until at least the 3rd century. Hadrian, prior to becoming Emperor, was tribunus militum of the XXIIth in 97–98.

Around 90 units of the XXII were garrisoned in or around the area of modern-day Butzbach, as part of the Limes Germanicus (a series of forts along the Roman frontier of Germania Superior. A stamp of the XXII Legion was found during excavations of a Roman Fort in Butzbach. The 22nd U.S. Infantry Regiment was stationed in Butzbach after World War II, and the stamp of the Legion and the emblem of the American unit were very similar.

The Rhine settlement was their main camp, but vexillationes of the legion participated in the building of the Antonine Wall in Scotland (2nd century) and in the campaigns against the Sassanid Empire (around 235).

They were still in Moguntiacum during the attack of the tribe of the Alamanni in 235, and were responsible for the assassination of Emperor Alexander Severus when he tried to negotiate with the enemy, along with the subsequent election of Maximinus Thrax as new emperor.

In 268, Primigenia probably fought under Gallienus at the Battle of Naissus, winning a victory over the Goths. The following year, the XXII Legion rebelled against Postumus, and proclaimed its commander Laelianus Emperor of the Gallic Empire.

In the beginning of the fourth century the legion was awarded the title "Primigenia CV" (presumably Constantiana Victrix). There is no record of it after the reign of Constantine the Great (r.306–337). One source suggests that it "may have been destroyed during the Battle of Mursa."

== Attested members ==
Name	Rank	Time frame	Province	Source
Gaius Dillius Vocula	legatus	69-70	Germania Superior	Tacitus, Histories, IV.25, 33, 56, 57
Lucius Catilius Severus	legatus	between 100 and 105	Germania Superior	CIL X, 8291
Aulus Junius Pastor	legatus	? 156-? 159	Germania Superior	CIL VI, 1435; CIL V, 7775
[...] Serenus	legatus	c. 162	Germania Superior	AE 1965, 243
Marcus Didius Serenus Julianus	legatus	? 168-? 171	Germania Superior	CIL VI, 1401
Lucius Marius Vegetinus	legatus	between 138 and 180	Germania Superior	CIL VI, 1455; CIL VI, 1456
Quintus Hedius Rufus Lollianus Gentianus	legatus	c. 184	Germania Superior	CIL II, 4121 = ILS 1145
Quintus Aurelius Polus Terentianus	legatus	c. 184	Germania Superior	AE 1965, 240
Claudius Gallus	legatus	? 195-197	Germania Superior	AE 1957, 123
Gaius Octavius Appius Suetrius Sabinus	legatus	211-213	Germania Superior	CIL X, 5398 = ILS 1159; CIL X, 5178; CIL VI, 1551, CIL VI, 1477
Domitius Antigonus	legatus	c. 220	Germania Superior	AE 1966, 262
[...]us L.f. Annianus	legatus	c. 242	Germania Superior	CIL XIII, 6763
L. Titinius L.f. Glaucus Lucretianus	tribunus angusticlavius	before 66	Germania Superior	CIL XI, 1331 = ILS 233
C. Vibius C.f. Salutaris	tribunus angusticlavius	between 70 and 75	Germania Superior	CIL III, 6065 = ILS 7194b; AE 1899, 64 = ILS 7194
Lucius Neratius Priscus	tribunus laticlavius	c. 79-c. 80	Germania Superior	AE 1969/70, 152
Lucius Caesennius Sospes	tribunus laticlavius	c. 89	Germania Superior	Tacitus, Annales, XV.28
Publius Aelius Hadrianus	tribunus laticlavius	c. 96	Germania Superior	Historia Augusta, "Hadrian", 3
Aulus Platorius Nepos	tribunus laticlavius	between 90 and 100	Germania Superior	
Quintus Lollius Urbicus	tribunus laticlavius	c. 125	Germania Superior	CIL VIII, 6706
Publius Coelius Balbinus Vibullius Pius	tribunus laticlavius	c. 130	Germania Superior	CIL VI, 1383
Marius Maximus	tribunus laticlavius	c. 175	Germania Superior	CIL VI, 1450

== Epigraphic inscriptions ==
- - Dis Manibus Avidiae Nice uxori rarissimi exempli Publicius Apronianus hastatus legionis XXII Primigeniae fecit. Tarragona (Tarraco), Spain. CIL II, 4147.
- - Amoena hic sita est Quintus Antonius Avitus veteranus legionis XXII Primigeniae faciendum (...). Lisbon, Portugal. AE 1981, 491.
- - (...) tribuno militum legionis XXII Primigeniae praefecto cohortium in Germania / MIL(...). Beja, Portugal. IRCP 235.

== See also ==
- List of Roman legions
