= Legio V Alaudae =

Roman legion

Fifth Legion Alaudae
- Legio V Alaudae; Legio Quinta Alaudae
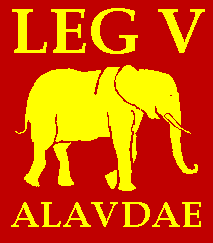
- Signum of the Fifth Legion Alaudae (simplified reconstruction)
- Active: 52 BC until either AD 70 or AD 86
- Country: Roman Republic (in the time of Julius Caesar) and Roman Empire
- Type: Roman legion (Marian)
- Nicknames: Alaudae, "of the Lark" (using a Gaulish word); Gallica

Legio V Alaudae ("Fifth Legion of the Lark"), sometimes also known as Legio V Gallica ("Fifth Gallic Legion"), was a legion of the Roman army founded in 52 BC by the general Gaius Julius Caesar (dictator of Rome 49-44 BC). It was levied in Transalpine Gaul to fight the armies of Vercingetorix, and was the first Roman legion to comprise non-citizens. Historians disagree whether the legion was destroyed during the Batavian rebellion in AD 70, or during the First Battle of Tapae (AD 86).

== History ==
=== Origin and early history ===
The legion was founded in Transalpine Gaul in 52 BC by Julius Caesar. Caesar paid the soldiers from his private purse. Only later was it recognized by the Senate. It is possible the legion was originally named Legio V Gallica. The unusual, Gaulish surname must refer to the Gallic custom to wear lark's wings on their helmets. The new legion saw its first action during the campaign against the Gallic leader Vercingetorix and the siege of Alesia. During the civil war between Caesar and Pompey, the V Alaudae took part in Caesar's invasion of Italy and stayed in Apulia for some time. It also fought at Dyrrhachium. The legion did take part in the African campaign against Cato, which culminated in the Battle of Thapsus. Here, the legion heroically fought against the elephants used by Caesar's republican enemies. This made a great impression, and V Alaudae became the only Caesarian legion known not to have used the bull as its emblem, instead choosing the elephant. This emblem was awarded in 46 BC for this action.

=== The last war of the Republic ===
After a civil war broke out between Mark Antony and Augustus, the legion sided with Antony and fought for him in the lost Battle of Mutina. When the two men earlier cooperated, they defeated Brutus and Cassius, who were seeking to restore the Republic after they had killed Caesar, in the Battle of Philippi the V Alaudae was there. The legion participated in Antony's war against the Parthian empire. Antony employed the legion also during his campaign against Octavian, which culminated in the naval Battle of Actium, where Antony was defeated. Augustus transferred the V Alaudae to Mérida in Lusitania after 30 BC, where it took part in the campaigns against the Cantabrians.

=== Service in Germania ===
After a few years, V Alaudae was moved to Gallia Belgica. While in Gaul the legion may have temporarily lost its standard when its commander Marcus Lollius was defeated by the Germanic Sugambri. The battle probably took place in the valley of the Meuse. Although we cannot be precise, it is likely that the transfer from Hispania Ulterior to Belgica had taken place in 19 BC, when Augustus' friend Marcus Vipsanius Agrippa invaded Germania. The legion was transferred to or Xanten by Augustus' stepson Drusus and it took part in his Germanic campaigns. The soldiers of V Alaudae crossed the Weser and reached the Elbe in 9 BC. For some time, they may have lived at Oberaden or Haltern on the east bank of the Rhine. In 6 AD, several legions marched against king Maroboduus of the Marcomanni in Czechia; at the same time, the V Alaudae were to attack the Marcomanni along the Elbe. It was to be the most grandiose operation that was ever conducted by a Roman army, but a rebellion in Pannonia obstructed its execution.

Not much later, the Battle of the Teutoburg Forest put an end to Roman ambition to conquer Germania. Commander Lucius Nonius Asprenas used the First legion Germanica and the Fifth legion Alaudae to occupy the fortresses of Germania Inferior and prevent a Germanic raid on Belgica After the disaster, V Alaudae was stationed at Xanten, together with XXI Rapax, keeping an eye on the nearby tribe of the Cugerni and guarding the confluence of the Rhine and Lippe. Both units took part in the Germanic campaigns of Germanicus in the first years of the reign of Tiberius. In 43 AD, the twenty-first was replaced by XV Primigenia. At the same time, Xanten was rebuilt. We know that the Fifteenth occupied the eastern half of the base, and the Fifth the western.

In 28 AD, the fifth legion suppressed a Frisian revolt, but the Emperor Tiberius nonetheless allowed the Frisians to be independent. Twelve years later, V Alaudae joined the emperor Caligula when he visited the delta of the Rhine. The famous anecdote, told by Suetonius, about the emperor commanding soldiers to collect shells on the beach, refers to the visit of the fifth to Lugdunum. The V Alaudae and XV Primigenia are thought to have been part of the expeditionary force that was led against the Frisians and Chauci by the Roman general Gnaeus Domitius Corbulo in 47 AD.

The operation was very successful, but the emperor Claudius ordered the Romans to keep the Rhine as the empire's frontier. The soldiers were now ordered to build fortifications along the Rhine and dig a canal from Matilo to the capital of the Cananefates, Voorburg; this canal still exists. Another non-military activity was the production of tiles. Every legion owned and operated a tilery. It is odd to notice that V Alaudae made these objects at Feldkassel, more than 90 kilometers away.

=== Year of Four Emperors ===
In 67 AD, many senators hated Nero. And several governors discussed his removal. Among these were Lucius Clodius Macer of Africa and Gaius Julius Vindex of one of the provinces in Gaul, who supported the governor of Hispania Tarraconensis, Servius Sulpicius Galba, when he proclaimed that he wanted to dethrone Nero. The army of Germania Inferior, which included the Legio V Alaudae marched to the south and defeated Gaius Julius Vindex. Therefore, the army of Germania Inferior acclaimed their own commander, Vitellius, as emperor, and marched on Rome. They were successful, and Vitellius started his reign. However, in the east, general Vespasian had also decided to make a bid for power; the two armies clashed near Cremona in northern Italy, and the Rhine army turned out to be no match for the soldiers of Vespasian.

=== Revolt of the Batavi ===
Meanwhile, in Germania Inferior the Batavians revolted. A Roman expeditionary force, consisting of the remains of V Alaudae and XV Primigenia, was defeated near Nijmegen, and not much later, these two legions found themselves besieged at Xanten. Although I Germanica, XVI Gallica and a legion from Germania Superior, XXII Primigenia, tried to rescue them, the two legions at Xanten were forced to surrender in March 70 AD. Not much later, I Germanica and XVI Gallica surrendered as well. It took several months before the new emperor Vespasian could send a strong Roman army to recover the Rhineland and suppress the Batavian revolt, commanded by his relative Quintus Petillius Cerialis. The legions XVI Gallica and IIII Macedonica, which had guarded Mainz, were renamed XVI Flavia Firma and IIII Flavia Felix; the remains of I Germanica were added with Galba's Seventh legion and became known as VII Gemina. XV Primigenia and V Alaudae were never reconstituted.

== Attested members ==
Name	Rank	Time frame	Province	Source
Cethegus Labeo	legatus legionis	c. 28	Rhine frontier	Tacitus, Annales, iv.73
Tiberius Plautius Silvanus Aelianus	legatus legionis	between 37 and 43	Rhine frontier	CIL XIV, 3608
Cornelius Aquinus	legatus legionis	68-69	Rhine frontier	Tacitus, Histories, i.7
Fabius Fabullus	legatus legionis	69-70	Rhine frontier	Tacitus, Histories, iii.14
[...] C.f. C.n. L. Pi[...]	tribunus angusticlavius	1st half of 1st C.	Rhine frontier	Epigraphica, 34 (1972), pp. 144f
Aulus Egrilus A.f. A.n. A.pron. Rufus	tribunus angusticlavius	2nd half of 1st C.	Rhine frontier	AE 1955, 168
Gnaeus Domitius Lucanus	tribunus laticlavius	c. 65	Rhine frontier	CIL XI, 5210
Gnaeus Domitius Tullus	tribunus laticlavius	c. 65	Rhine frontier	CIL XI, 5211

== See also ==
- List of Roman legions
- Roman legion
