= Ancient Macedonian calendar =

Lunisolar calendar

The Ancient Macedonian calendar is a lunisolar calendar that was in use in ancient Macedon in the 1st millennium BCE. It consisted of 12 synodic lunar months (i.e. 354 days per year), which needed intercalary months to stay in step with the seasons. By the time the calendar was being used across the Hellenistic world, seven total embolimoi (intercalary months) were being added in each 19 year Metonic cycle. The names of the ancient Macedonian Calendar remained in use in Syria even into the Christian era.

== Names ==
The names of the Macedonian months, just like most of the names of Greek months, are derived from feasts and related celebrations in honor of various Greek gods. Most of them combine a Macedonian dialectal form with a clear Greek etymology (e.g. Δῐός from Zeus; Περίτιος from Heracles Peritas ("Guardian"); Ξανδικός / Ξανθικός from Xanthos, "the blond" (probably a reference to Heracles); Άρτεμίσιος from Artemis etc.) with the possible exception of one, which is also attested in other Greek calendars.

== Description ==
The Macedonian calendar was in essence the Babylonian calendar with the substitution of Macedonian names for the Babylonian ones, and as such it paralleled the Hebrew calendar which is also lunisolar, and was used during the Parthian Empire too. An example of 6th century CE inscriptions from Decapolis, Jordan, bearing the Solar Macedonian calendar, starts from the month Audynaeus. The solar type was merged later with the Julian calendar. In Roman Macedonia, both calendars were used. The Roman one is attested in inscriptions with the name Kalandôn gen. καλανδῶν calendae and the Macedonian Hellenikei dat. Ἑλληνικῇ Hellenic. Finally an inscription from Kassandreia of about c. 306–298 BCE bearing a month Ἀθηναιῶν Athenaion suggests that some cities may have used their own months even after the 4th century BCE Macedonian expansion.

Order	Greek name(s)	Transliteration	Approximate modern month	Remarks
1	Δίος	Dios (Zeus)	October	
2	Ἀπελλαῖος	Apellaios	November	Also a Dorian month – Apellaiōn was a Tenian month
3	Αὐδυναῖος or Αὐδναῖος	Audunaios or Audnaios	December	Also a Cretan month
4	Περίτιος	Peritios	January	And festival of the month; Peritia
5	Δύστρος	Dystros	February	
6	Ξανδικός or Ξανθικός	Xandikos or Xanthikos	March	And festival of the month; Xanthika, purifying the army, Hesych
‡	Ξανδικός Ἐμβόλιμος	Xandikos Embolimos	‡	intercalated 6 times over a 19 year cycle
7	Ἀρτεμίσιος or Ἀρταμίτιος	Artemisios or Artamitios	April	Also a Spartan, Rhodian, and Epidaurian month – Artemisiōn was an Ionic month
8	Δαίσιος	Daisios	May	
9	Πάνημος or Πάναμος	Panēmos or Panamos	June	Also an Epidaurian, Miletian, Samian, and Corinthian month
10	Λώιος	Lōios	July	Ὀμολώιος (Homolōios) was an Aetolian, Boeotian, and Thessalian month
11	Γορπιαῖος	Gorpiaios	August	
12	Ὑπερβερεταῖος	Hyperberetaios	September	Hyperberetos was a Cretan month
‡	Ὑπερβερεταῖος Ἑμβόλιμος	Hyperberetaios Embolimos	‡	Intercalated only once over a 19 year cycle

‡ Months marked with a double-dagger include the word embolimos; they were only used occasionally for intercalation during each 19 year calendar cycle, in the manner described in the remarks.

== Year numbering ==
Years were usually counted from the re-conquest of Seleucus I Nicator of Babylon, which became "year 1". This is equivalent to 312 BCE / 311 BCE in the Anno Domini year count of the modern Gregorian calendar. This practice spread outside the Seleucid Empire and found use in Antigonid Macedonia, Ptolemaic Egypt, and other major Hellenistic states descended from Alexander's conquests as well. Years can be abbreviated SE, S.E., or occasionally AG (Anno Graecorum).

== See also ==
- Ancient Greek calendars
- Attic calendar
