= Battle of Stanwick =

Historic battle

The Battle of Stanwick was a conflict that took place in AD 71, near Stanwick in northern England, between the Roman army and the Brigantes, in which the Romans defeated the Brigantes.

Doubt has been expressed about this battle, and there is no evidence of any battle of significance having been fought at this site despite several archaeological investigations.
