= Legio XVI Gallica =

Roman legion

Legio XVI Gallica ("Gallic Sixteenth Legion") was a legion of the Imperial Roman army. The legion was recruited by Julius Caesar's adopted son, Octavian in 41/40 BC. It was disbanded after surrendering during the Batavian rebellion (AD 70); Emperor Vespasian created a new legion, the XVI Flavia Firma.

== Operational History ==
Raised by Octavian around 41/40 BC to fight against Sextus Pompey, Legio XVI was later stationed along the Rhine frontier following the reorganization of the Roman provinces. After the catastrophic Battle of the Teutoburg Forest in AD 9, the XVI Gallica was relocated to Mogontiacum (modern Mainz, Germany) alongside Legio XIV Gemina to reinforce Germania Superior against potential Germanic incursions. During the reign of Claudius, the legion actively participated in campaigns against the Chatti. In AD 70, during the turmoil of the Batavian Rebellion, units of the legion surrendered to Civilis after being besieged. Following the restoration of order by Emperor Vespasian, the compromised legion was disbanded, and its loyal remnants were reconstituted into a new formation, Legio XVI Flavia Firma.

== Attested members ==
Name	Rank	Time frame	Province	Source
Quintus Trebellius Catulus	legatus legionis	between 39 and 54	Germania	CIL VI, 31771
Lucius Cornelius Pusio Annius Messalla	legatus legionis	before 69	Germania	CIL VI, 31706
Numisius Rufus	legatus legionis	69-70	Germania	Tacitus, Histories IV.22, 59, 70, 77
Publius Quinctius	tribunus angusticlavius	during the Triumvirate?	?	CIL VI, 3533
Claudius Sanctus	tribunus angusticlavius	69	Germania	Tacitus, Histories, IV.62
Marcus Helvius Geminus	tribunus laticlavius	between 38 and 54	Germania	CIL III, 6074

== See also ==
- List of Roman legions
