= Gaius Julius Civilis =

Leader of the Batavian rebellion against the Romans in 69 AD

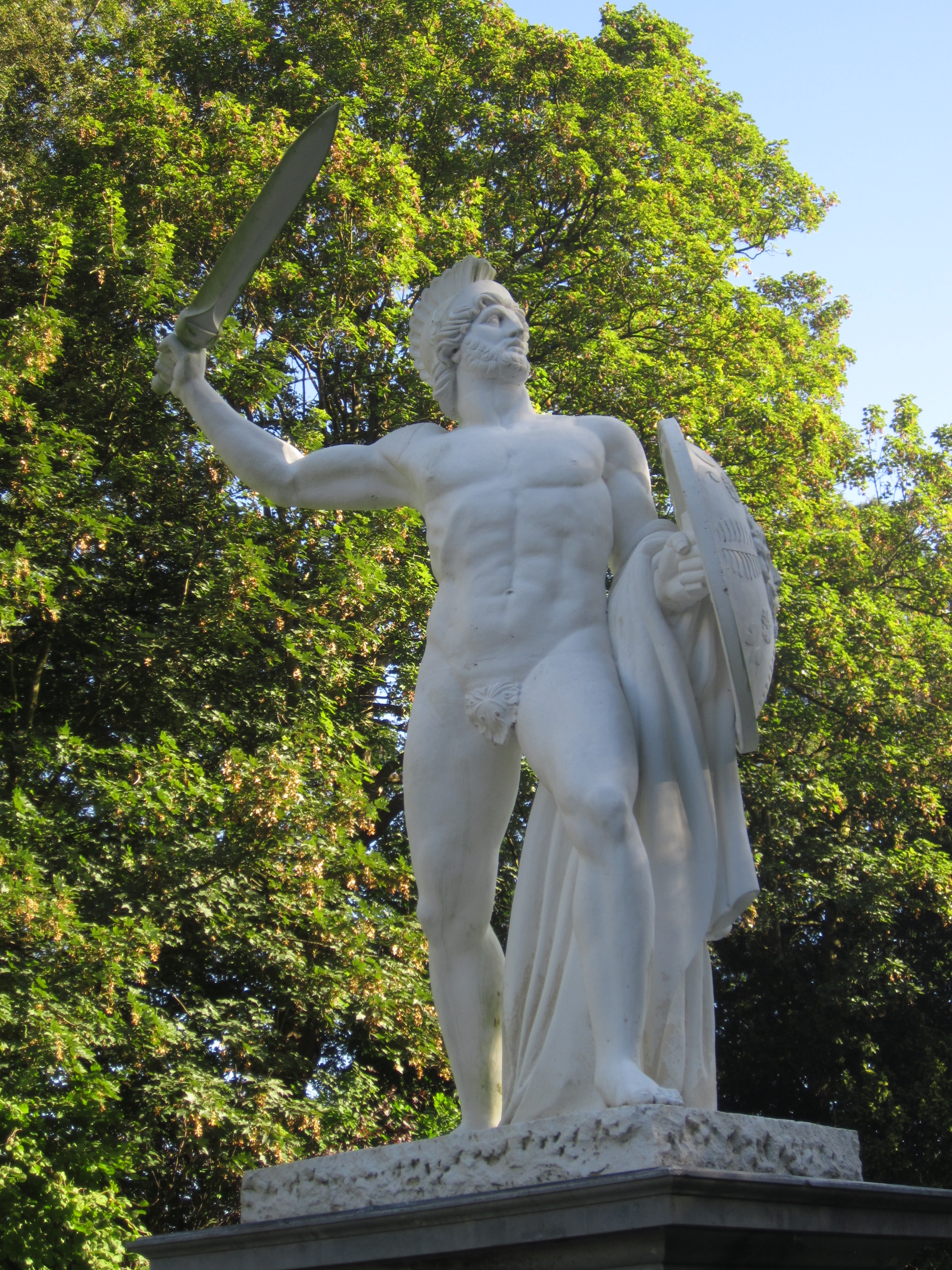
- Statue of Civilis in Tervuren by Lodewijk Van Geel (1820–1821)
- Born: AD 25
- Died: c. 1st century
- Allegiance: Batavi
- Known for: Revolt of the Batavi

Gaius Julius Civilis (AD 25 – c. 1st century; erroneously also Claudius Civilis) was the leader of the Batavian rebellion against the Romans in 69 AD. His nomen shows that he (or one of his male ancestors) was made a Roman citizen (and thus, the tribe a Roman vassal) by either Augustus or Caligula.

== Early history ==
Gaius Julius Civilis was born in AD 25. He was twice imprisoned on a charge of rebellion, and narrowly escaped execution. During the disturbances that followed the death of Nero, he took up arms under pretense of siding with Vespasian and induced the inhabitants of his native country to rebel. The Batavians, who had rendered valuable service under the early emperors, had been well treated in order to attach them to the cause of Rome. They were exempt from tribute, but were obliged to supply a large number of men for the army, and the burden of conscription and the oppression of provincial governors were important incentives to revolt. The Batavians were immediately joined by several neighboring Germanic tribes.

== Revolt ==
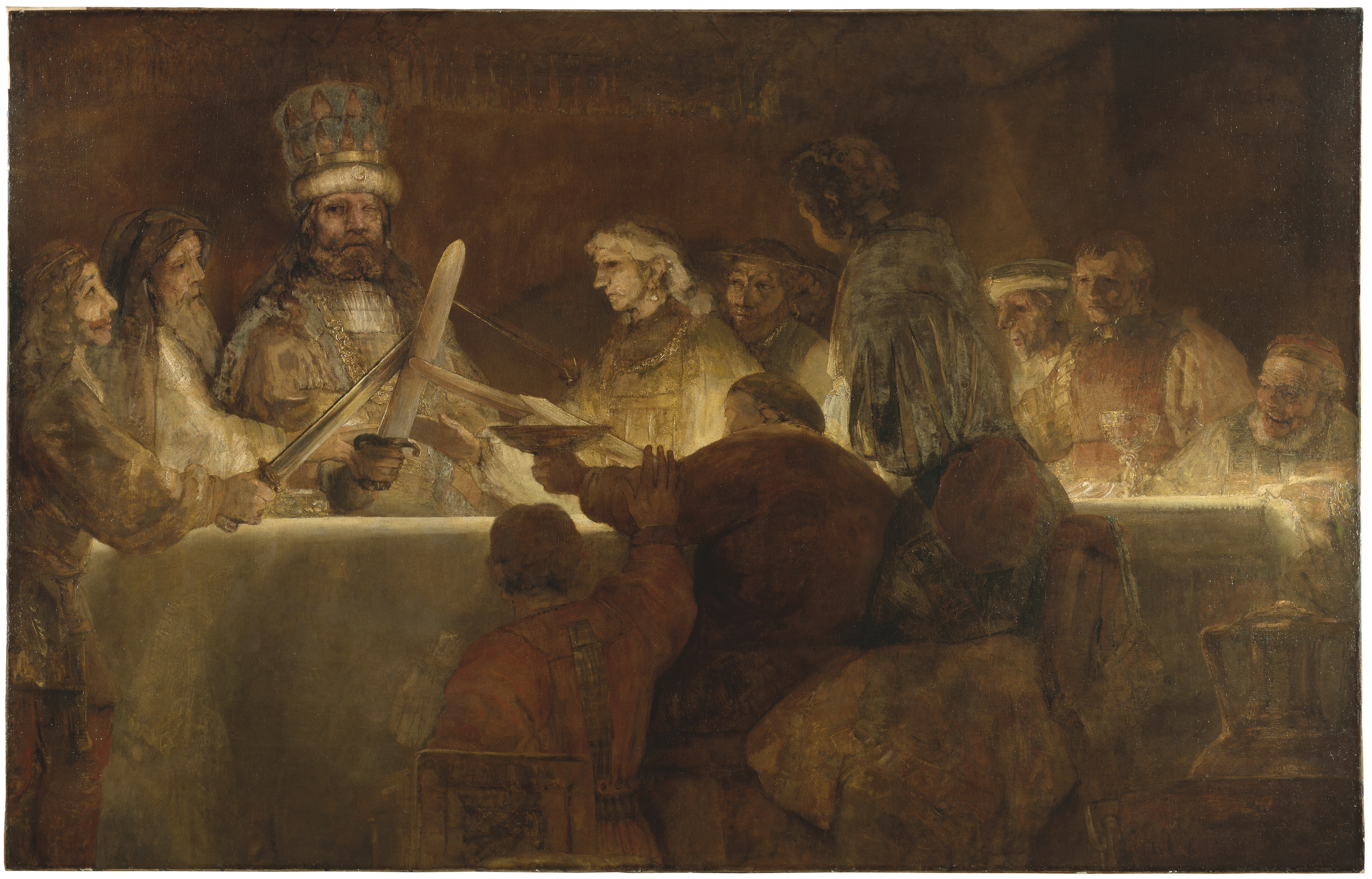
The Conspiracy of Claudius Civilis, completed in 1661 by Rembrandt. It depicts a Batavian oath to Gaius Julius Civilis, the head of the Batavian rebellion against the Romans in 69 AD.

The Roman garrisons near the Rhine were driven out, and twenty-four ships captured. Two legions under Mummius Lupercus were defeated at Castra Vetera (near the modern Xanten) and surrounded. Eight cohorts of Batavian veterans joined their countrymen, and the troops sent by Vespasian to the relief of Vetera threw in their lot with them.

Let Syria, Asia Minor, and the East, habituated as it is to despotism, submit to slavery ... Freedom is a gift bestowed by nature even on the dumb animals. Courage is the peculiar excellence of man, and the Gods help the braver side.

— Gaius Julius Civilis

The result of these accessions to the forces of Civilis was a rising in Gaul. Hordeonius Flaccus was murdered by his troops (70 AD), and the whole of the Roman forces were induced by two commanders of the Gallic auxiliaries—Julius Classicus and Julius Tutor—to revolt from Rome and join Civilis. The whole of Gaul thus practically declared itself independent, and the foundation of a new kingdom of Gaul was contemplated. The prophetess Veleda predicted the complete success of Civilis and the fall of the Roman Empire. But disputes broke out among the different tribes and rendered co-operation impossible; Vespasian, having successfully ended the civil war, called upon Civilis to lay down his arms, and on his refusal resolved to take strong measures for the suppression of the revolt.

== Defeat and surrender ==
The arrival of Quintus Petillius Cerialis with a strong force awed the Gauls and mutinous troops into submission; Civilis was defeated at Augusta Treverorum (Trier, Trèves) and Castra Vetera, and forced to withdraw to the island of the Batavians. He finally came to an agreement with Cerialis whereby his countrymen obtained certain advantages, and resumed amicable relations with Rome. From this time, Civilis disappears from history.
