= Quintus Petillius Cerialis =

1st century AD Roman general, consul and administrator

Quintus Petillius Cerialis Caesius Rufus (c. AD 30 – after AD 83), otherwise known as Quintus Petillius Cerialis, was a Roman general and administrator who served in Britain during Boudica's rebellion and went on to participate in the civil wars after the death of Nero. He later crushed the rebellion of Julius Civilis and returned to Britain as its governor.

Because he probably succeeded Caesius Nasica as commander of Legio IX Hispana, and since brothers are often attested as serving in succession in the same post, Anthony Birley suggests that Cerialis was the younger brother of Nasica, and had been adopted by Petillius Rufus, who was known as praetor in AD 28. However, in his monograph of naming practices in the first centuries of the Roman Empire, Olli Salomies argues that Cerialis was actually the biological son of Petillius Rufus by a woman named Caesia, who may have been the daughter of a Caesius Cerialis, therefore Caesius Nasica would not have been his brother "but a close relative."

== Boudican rebellion ==
His first important assignment was as legate of Legio IX Hispana (Ninth Iberian Legion) in the Roman province of Britannia, under governor Gaius Suetonius Paulinus. In the defeat of the 60/61 rebellion led by Queen Boudica of the Iceni, Cerialis suffered a serious defeat when attempting to relieve the city of Camulodunum (Colchester), which was taken by the Britons before he arrived. "The victorious enemy met Petilius Cerialis, commander of the ninth legion, as he was coming to the rescue, routed his troops, and destroyed all his infantry. Cerialis escaped with some cavalry into the camp, and was saved by its fortifications."

== Civil war ==
As the son-in-law of Vespasian, being the husband of Domitilla the Younger, Cerialis was made a hostage by Vitellius in 69, during the civil wars of the Year of Four Emperors. Cerialis managed to escape disguised as a peasant and joined the Flavian army. He was one of the cavalry leaders that conquered Rome for the approaching Vespasian. His role was to enter Rome via Sabine territory along the Via Salaria.

This success and his brother-in-law's trust gave him the command of XIV Gemina, then stationed in the difficult province of Germania Inferior. Again, Cerialis had to deal with a local revolt, the Batavian rebellion, in which the local tribes, led by Julius Civilis, a romanized prince, besieged two Roman legions at Xanten. Cerialis was again successful and received honours from Vespasian, which included his first consulate.

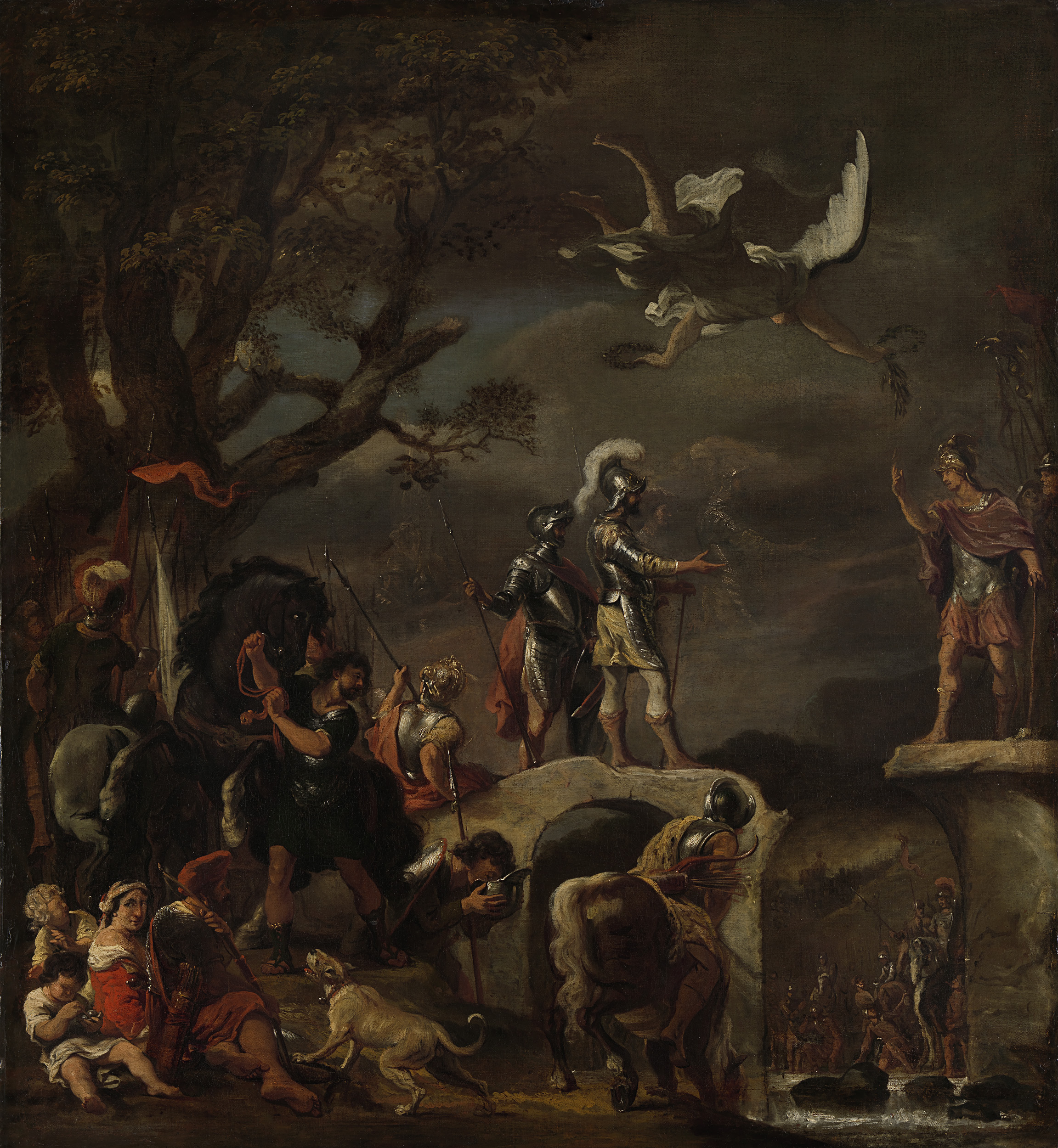
Negotiations between Cerealis and Claudius Civilis, in a 17th-century painting by Ferdinand Bol

== Later career ==
In 71, Cerialis was appointed governor of Roman Britain, bringing the II Adiutrix with him to the province. He was supported by Gnaeus Julius Agricola, commander of XX Valeria Victrix.

As governor, Cerialis campaigned against the Brigantes of northern England. In 74, Cerialis left Britain; a military diploma dated 21 May 74 attests he was consul a second time, with Titus Clodius Eprius Marcellus as his colleague.

According to the 1911 Encyclopædia Britannica, "Tacitus says that he was a bold soldier rather than a careful general, and preferred to stake everything on the issue of a single engagement. He possessed natural eloquence of a kind that readily appealed to his soldiers. His loyalty to his superiors was unshakable".

Political offices
Preceded by Vespasian II, and Titus as Ordinary consuls	Suffect consul of the Roman Empire; 70 with Gaius Licinius Mucianus	Succeeded by Quintus Julius Cordinus Gaius Rutilius Gallicus, and ignotus as Suffect consuls
Preceded by Marcus Vettius Bolanus	Governor of Roman Britain; 71-74	Succeeded by Sextus Julius Frontinus
Preceded by Lucius Junius Quintus Vibius Crispus II, and Titus	Suffect consul of the Roman Empire; 74 with Titus Clodius Eprius Marcellus II	Succeeded by ignotus, and ...]on[. as Suffect consuls
