= Revolt of the Batavi =

Uprising against the Roman Empire (69–70 CE)

- Part of the Year of the Four Emperors
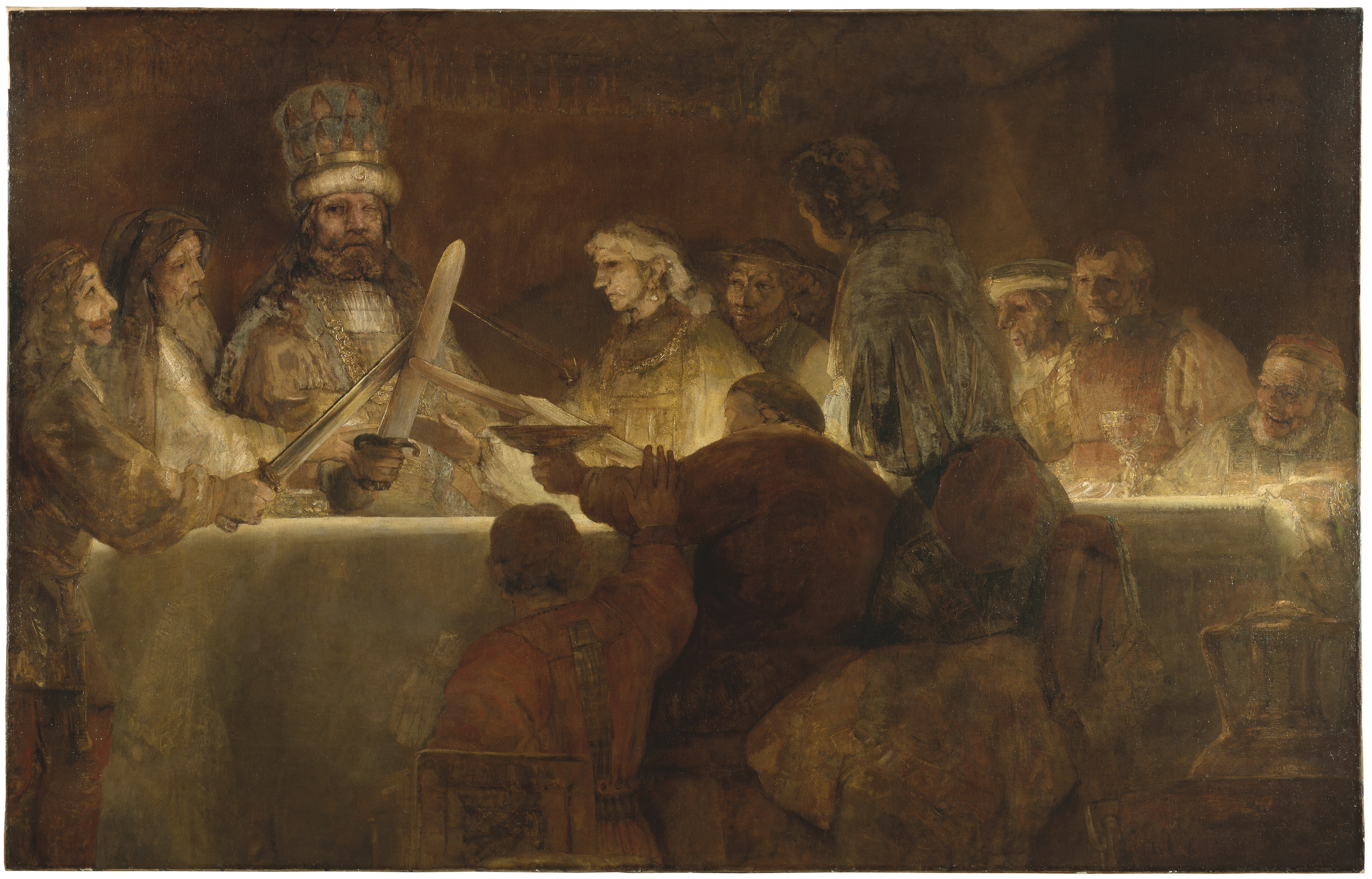
- The Conspiracy of Claudius Civilis, completed by Rembrandt in 1661
Date	AD 69–70
Location	Germania Inferior
Result	Roman victory; Subjugation of the Batavi

Belligerents
Batavi; Cananefates; Frisii; Lingones; Treveri	Roman Empire

Commanders and leaders
Gaius Julius Civilis; Brinno; Julius Tutor; Julius Classicus; Veleda	Marcus Hordeonius Flaccus; Claudius Labeo; Munius Lupercus; Quintus Petillius Cerialis

Strength
Depending on definition of loyalty: One Batavi ala and eight cohorts; 5,000+ Batavi (mostly cavalry); Two defecting Roman legions; 10,000; Varying support from other tribes; likely thousands; Total: 5,000–20,000	Initially: Four Roman legions and attempted reinforcements; 10,000–15,000+ Later: Eight Roman legions; 40,000 Total: 60,000–65,000

Casualties and losses
Relatively light	10,000–20,000+

The Revolt of the Batavi took place in the Roman province of Germania Inferior ("Lower Germania") between AD 69 and 70. It was an uprising against the Roman Empire started by the Batavi, a small but militarily powerful Germanic tribe that inhabited Batavia, on the delta of the river Rhine. They were soon joined by the Celtic tribes from Gallia Belgica and some Germanic tribes.

Under the leadership of their hereditary prince Gaius Julius Civilis, an auxiliary officer in the Imperial Roman army, the Batavi and their allies managed to inflict a series of humiliating defeats on the Roman army, including the destruction of two legions. After these initial successes, a massive Roman army led by the Roman general Quintus Petillius Cerialis eventually defeated the rebels. Following peace talks, the Batavi submitted again to Roman rule, but were forced to accept humiliating terms and a legion stationed permanently on their territory, at Noviomagus (modern day Nijmegen, The Netherlands).

== Background ==
The Batavi were a sub-tribe of the Germanic Chatti tribal group who had migrated to the region between the Old Rhine and Waal rivers (still today called the Betuwe after them) in what became the Roman province of Germania Inferior (S Netherlands/Nordrhein). Their land, in spite of potentially fertile alluvial deposits, was largely uncultivable, consisting mainly of Rhine delta swamps. Thus the Batavi population it could support was tiny: not more than 35,000 at this time. However in the century after the Roman conquest of neighbouring Gaul trade had flourished with Roman, Gaulish and Germanic material culture being found together in the region.

They were a warlike people, skilled horsemen, boatmen and swimmers. They were therefore excellent soldier-material. In return for the unusual privilege of exemption from tributum (direct taxes on land and heads that most peregrini were subject to), they supplied a disproportionate number of recruits to the Julio-Claudian auxilia, particularly in the cavalry: one ala and eight cohortes. They also provided most of the emperor Augustus' elite regiment of Germanic bodyguards (Germani corpore custodes), which continued in existence until AD 68. The Batavi auxilia amounted to about 5,000 men, implying that for the entire Julio-Claudian period, over 50% of all Batavi males reaching military age (16 years) may have enlisted in the auxilia. Thus, the Batavi, although just about 0.05% of the total population of the empire in AD 23, supplied about 4% of the total auxilia, i.e. 80 times their proportionate share. They were regarded by the Romans as the best and bravest (fortissimi, validissimi) of their auxiliary, and indeed of all their forces. In Roman service, they had perfected a unique technique for swimming across rivers wearing full armour and weapons.

Gaius Julius Civilis (not his given name) was a hereditary prince of the Batavi and the prefect (commanding officer) of a Batavi cohort. A veteran of 25 years' distinguished service in the Roman army, he and the eight Batavi cohorts had played an important role in the Roman invasion of Britain in AD 43 and the subsequent subjugation of that country (43–66).

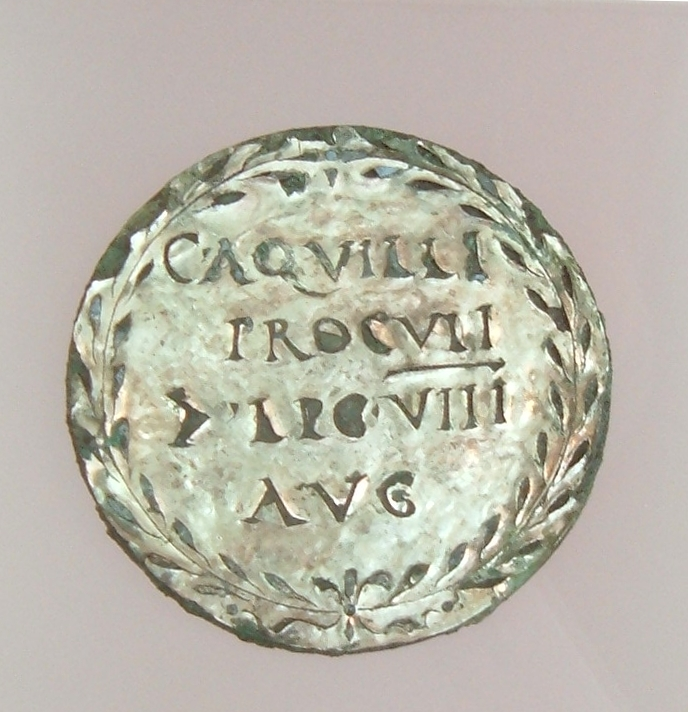
Silver-plated medal, denoting the property of C. Aquilius Proculus, the primus pilus who organized the retreat of Roman troops from the Rhineland and was betrayed by his local auxiliaries. (Tac. Historiae IV.18). The medal was found on the Kops Plateau in Nijmegen.

By 69, however, Civilis, the Batavi regiments and the Batavi people had become utterly disaffected from Rome. After the Batavi regiments were withdrawn from Britain in 66, Civilis and his brother (also a prefect) were arrested by the governor of Germania Inferior on false accusations of treason. The governor ordered the brother's execution, and sent Civilis to Rome in chains for judgement by the Roman emperor Nero. (The difference in treatment indicates that the brother was still a peregrinus, i.e. a non-citizen subject of the empire, while Civilis, as his name implies, had been accorded Roman citizenship, which entitled him to have his case heard by the emperor in person). While Civilis was in prison awaiting trial, Nero was overthrown in AD 68 by an army led into Italy by the governor of Hispania Tarraconensis, the veteran general Galba. Nero committed suicide, ending the rule of the Julio-Claudian dynasty, founded a century earlier by Augustus. Galba was proclaimed emperor. He acquitted Civilis of the treason charge and allowed him to return home.

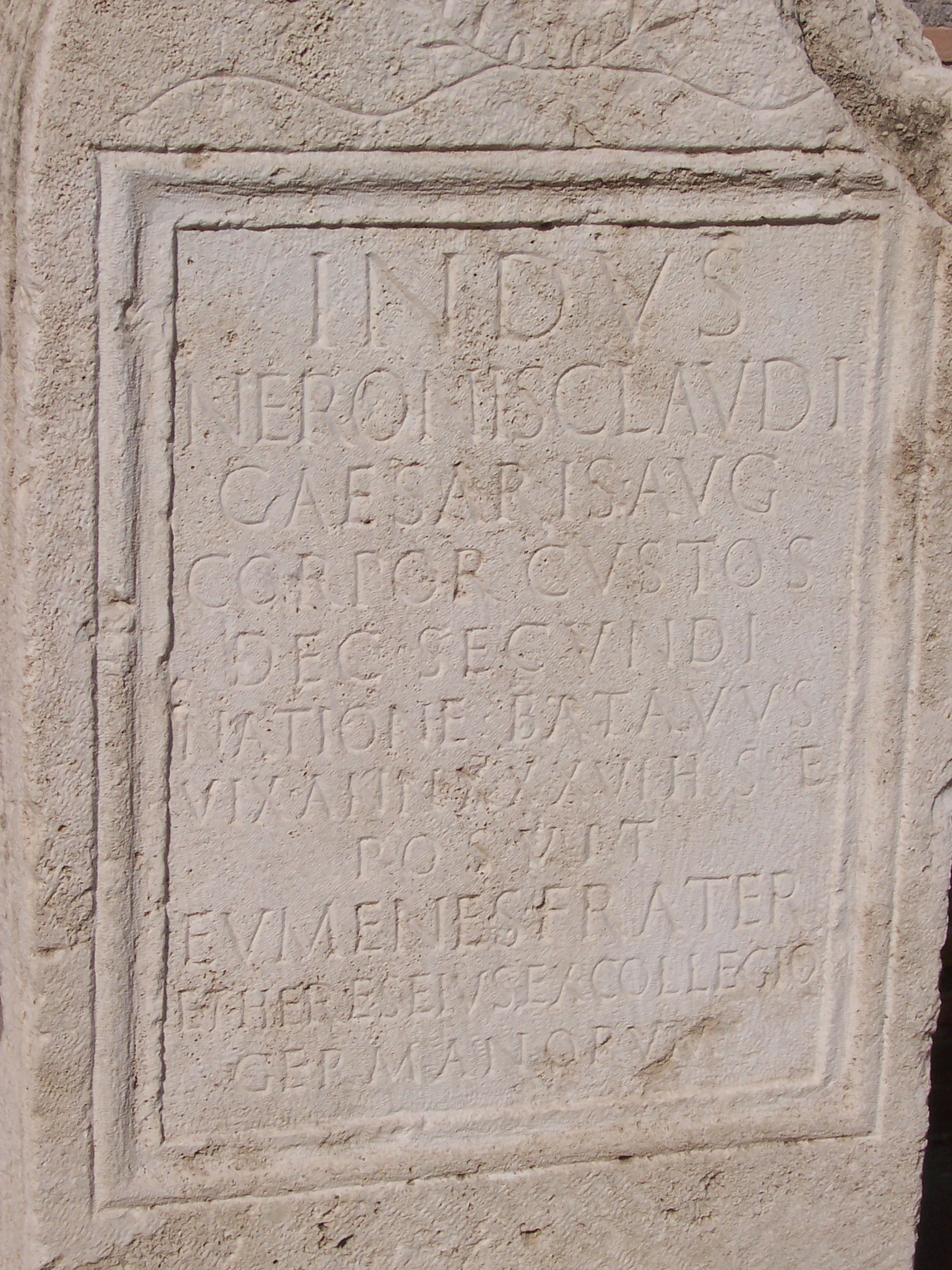
Funerary stela of a Batavian member of the Corporis Custodes of Nero

Back in Germania Inferior, however, it seems that Civilis was arrested again, this time on the order of the new governor Aulus Vitellius, acting at the urging of the legions under his command, which demanded Civilis' execution. Meanwhile, Galba disbanded the German Bodyguards Regiment, which he distrusted due to the loyalty they had given to Nero in the latter's final days. This alienated several hundred crack Batavi troops, and indeed the whole Batavi nation, who considered it a grave insult. At the same time, relations collapsed between the eight Batavi cohorts and their parent-legion XIV Gemina, to which they had been attached since the invasion of Britain 25 years earlier. The seething hatred between the Roman legionaries and their German auxiliaries erupted in serious fighting on at least two occasions.

At this juncture, the Roman Empire was convulsed by its first major civil war for a century, the Year of the Four Emperors. The cause was the fall of the Julio-Claudian dynasty. The descendants of Augustus had enjoyed the automatic and fervent loyalty of ordinary legionaries in the frontier armies, but Galba possessed no such legitimacy in their eyes. Supreme power was now open to whichever general was strong enough to seize it (and keep it). First, in AD 69, Galba's deputy, Otho, carried out a coup d'état in Rome against his leader. Amongst all the chaos, Galba was killed by the Praetorian Guard under Otho's command.

Then Vitellius launched his own bid for power and prepared to lead the Rhine legions into Italy against Otho. Now in urgent need of the Batavi's military support, Vitellius released Civilis. In return, the Batavi regiments helped Vitellius defeat Otho's forces at the Battle of Bedriacum. The Batavi troops were then ordered to return home. But at this point news arrived of the mutiny of general Titus Flavius Vespasianus, commander of forces in Syria, whose own massive army of five legions was soon joined by the legions on the Danube. Vitellius' governor in Germania Inferior, desperate to raise more troops, lost the goodwill of the Batavi by attempting to conscript more Batavi than the maximum stipulated in their treaty. The brutality and corruption of the Roman recruiting centurions, who were also responsible for many cases of sexual assault on Batavi boys, brought already deep discontent in the Batavi homeland to the boil.

== Uprising ==
Rhine frontier of the Roman empire, AD 70, showing the location of the Batavi in the Rhine delta region. Roman territory shaded dark.

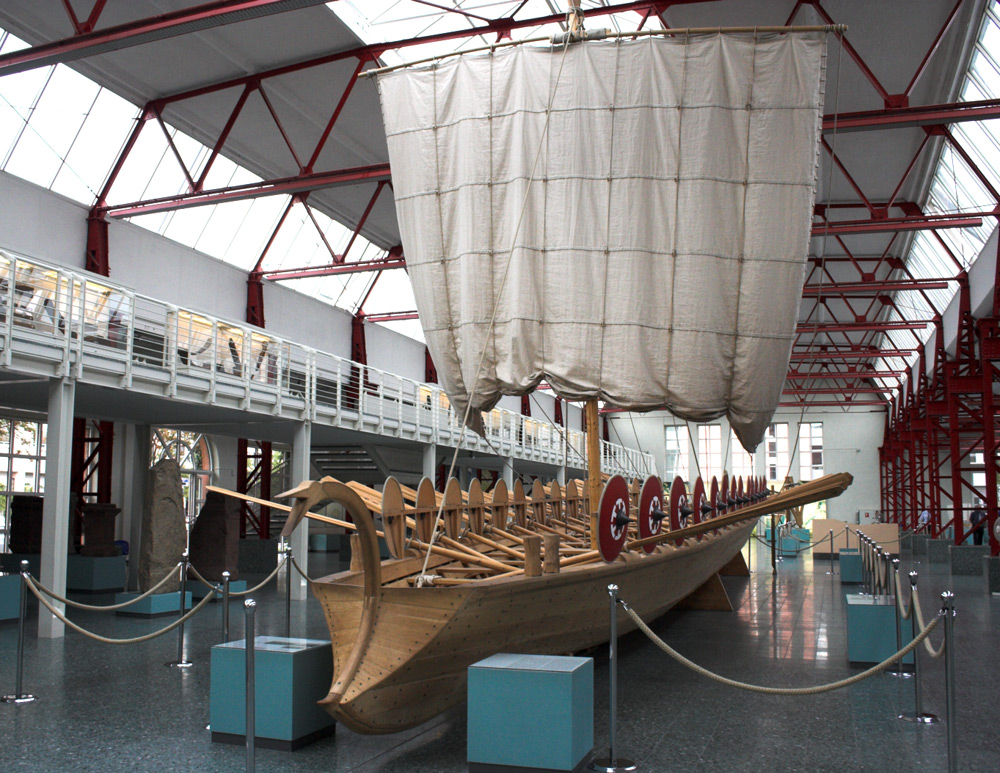
Reconstruction of a Roman fluvial boat, a navis lusoria of the classis germanica (Rhine flotilla). It is based on the remarkable discovery of the remains of five Roman boats at Mainz in the early 1980s. The boat above, denoted Mainz Type A, was designed as a rapid intervention launch, with long, narrow shape and shallow keel. It would be rowed by the troops themselves (32 oars, 16 on each side). Note the mounted shields to protect the oarsmen from missiles shot from the riverbanks. At the time of Civilis' revolt (AD 69), most such boats were manned by Batavi crews. 4th century. Museum für Antike Schifffahrt, Mainz, Germany.

In the summer of 69, Civilis was commander of the Batavian auxiliary troops allocated in the Rhine legions. He was aware of Roman military tactics which gave him ideas on how to defeat them. The first action was to set up a decoy and Civilis induced a rebellion outside of Batavia and fragment the Northern Roman army.

Let Syria, Asia Minor, and the East, habituated as it is to despotism, submit to slavery... Freedom is a gift bestowed by nature even on the dumb animals. Courage is the peculiar excellence of man, and the Gods help the braver side. —Gaius Julius Civilis

The tribe of the Cananefates was living in lands between the Batavians and the North Sea. The inducements used by Civilis to instigate rebellion are not known, but the Cananefates, led by their chief Brinno, attacked several Roman forts, including Traiectum (Utrecht). With most of the troops in Italy fighting in the civil war, the Romans were caught off guard. Flaccus, commander of the Rhine legions, sent auxiliary troops to control the situation. The result was another disaster for the Romans. Civilis assumed the role of mastermind of the rebellion and defeated the Romans near modern Arnhem.

Flaccus ordered the V Alaudae and the XV Primigenia legions to deal with the rebels. Accompanying them were three auxiliary units, including a Batavian cavalry squadron, commanded by Claudius Labeo, a known enemy of Civilis. The battle took place near modern Nijmegen. The Batavian regiment deserted to their countrymen, giving a blow to the already feeble morale of the Romans. The Roman army was beaten and the legions forced to retreat to their base camp of Castra Vetera (modern Xanten).

By this time, the Batavians clearly had the upper hand. Even Vespasian, who was fighting Vitellius for the imperial throne, saluted the rebellion that kept his enemy from calling the Rhine legions to Italy. The Batavians were promised independence and Civilis was on his way to becoming king.

== Castra Vetera ==
For unknown reasons, this was not enough for the Batavians. Civilis chose to pursue vengeance and swore to destroy the two Roman legions. The timing was well chosen. With the civil war of the Year of the Four Emperors at its peak, it would take some time before Rome could produce an effective counterattack. Moreover, the eight Batavian auxiliary units of Vitellius' army were on their way home and could be easily persuaded to join the rebellion for an independent Batavia. This was an important reinforcement. Apart from being veteran troops, their numbers were greater than the combined Roman troops stationed in Moguntiacum (Mainz) and Bonna (Bonn).

In September 69, Civilis initiated the siege of Castra Vetera, the camp of the 5,000 legionaries of V Alaudae and XV Primigenia. The camp was very modern, filled with supplies and well-defended, with walls of mud, brick, and wood, towers, and a double ditch. After some failed attempts to take the camp by force, Civilis decided to starve the troops into surrender.

Meanwhile, Flaccus decided to wait for the result of the war in Italy. Not long before, the Rhine legions had been punished by Galba for their actions against the rebel Vindex of Gallia Lugdunensis. Vespasian was winning the war and Civilis was helping him to become emperor by preventing at least the two legions besieged in Castra Vetera, loyal to Vitellius, from coming to his rescue. Flaccus and his commanders did not want to risk a second military gaffe and decided to wait for instructions. When the news of Vitellius' defeat arrived, Civilis still continued the siege. He was not fighting for Vespasian, he was fighting for Batavia. Flaccus started to prepare a counterattack to rescue the besieged legions. Civilis was not going to wait until they were fully prepared and launched a surprise attack. In the evening of 1 December, his best eight cavalry cohorts attacked the Romans in Krefeld. The Roman army won the battle and destroyed the Batavian cavalry, but their own losses were enormous.

Knowing that the Romans would come to Castra Vetera, Civilis abandoned the siege and threatened to attack Moguntiacum. The Romans were misled and rushed to the rescue of their main base in Germania Superior. In Moguntiacum they received the news of Vespasian's accession to the throne. Flaccus decided to celebrate the event by distributing a sum of money to the legions, but these legions were historically loyal to Vitellius, their former commander, and this act of generosity was interpreted as an offense. Flaccus was murdered and his second-in-command deserted, leaving the Roman army in a state of confusion.

Civilis saw his chance and before the Romans knew what was happening, his troops besieged Castra Vetera once more.

== Rebellion continues ==
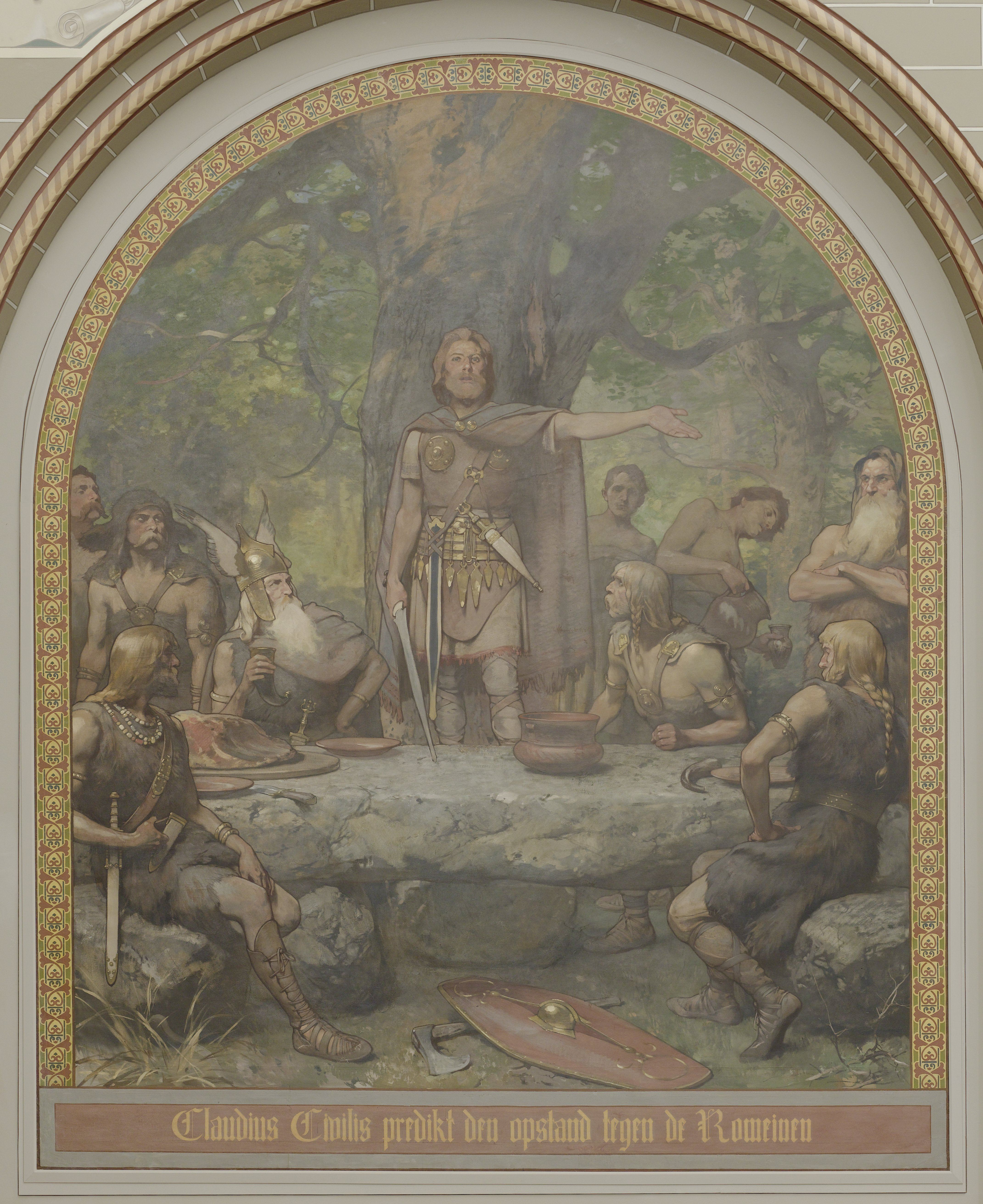
Civilis preaches revolt against the Romans to the Batavi. Mural in the Rijksmuseum by Georg Sturm.

The year 70 started with the odds favoring the rebels. Two legions were still besieged at Castra Vetera and the rest of the Roman army was not large enough to cope with the revolt. Apart from the Batavian rebellion, the Trevirans and Lingones had declared the independence of Gaul. Julius Sabinus, the rebel emperor, managed to persuade the I Germanica and XVI Gallica to come over to his side. At Castra Vetera the situation was desperate. Food supplies had run out and the besieged legions were eating horses and mules to survive. With no prospect of a relief, the commander of the troops, Munius Lupercus, decided to surrender.

The legions were promised safe conduct if they left the camp to be sacked by the rebels. All weapons, artillery material, and gold was left to plunder. V Alaudae and XV Primigenia marched out of the camp, but after only a few kilometers they were ambushed by Germanic troops and destroyed. The commander and principal officers were made slaves and given as a present to Veleda, the prophetess who had predicted the rise of the Batavians.

After this success, Civilis went to Colonia Agrippina (Cologne) and set up camp there. In the next months, he invested his time in convincing other tribes from northern Gaul and Germania to join the rebellion.

== Rome retaliates ==
The rebellion in Germania was now a real threat to the Empire. Two legions had been lost, two others (I Germanica and XVI Gallica) were controlled by the rebels. This could not be allowed for much longer. As soon as Vespasian had the Empire in his hands and the situation in Italy under control, he decided to act. He nominated Quintus Petillius Cerialis, a close relative and experienced general, as commander of the avenging force. Not wanting to risk a defeat, an enormous army was summoned. The legions VIII Augusta, XI Claudia, XIII Gemina, XXI Rapax, and the recently levied II Adiutrix were immediately sent to Germania. Additionally, the legions I Adiutrix and VI Victrix were summoned from Hispania and XIV Gemina from Britannia. Most parts of these legions were deployed to pacify other parts of Gaul and Germania Superior and secure the Rhine frontier. Still, Cerialis' army was a massive one and posed a serious threat to the rebels.

On the news of the approaching army, Julius Tutor, one of Civilis' allies, surrendered. The "imprisoned" legions, I Germanica and XVI Gallica, capitulated. They were disgraced and no longer had the confidence of Rome. The I Germanica was disbanded and its legionaries were added to the VII Gemina in Pannonia. XVI Gallica was reconstituted with the name of Legio XVI Flavia Firma. Pushing down from all directions, Cerialis forced the rebels and their (now scarce) allies to retreat to the North. The rebellion was now confined to Germania Inferior.

From his homeland of Batavia, Civilis tried for some time to attack the Roman army in a series of raids by land and, with the help of his fleet, in the rivers Waal and Rhine. In one of these raids, Civilis managed to capture the flagship of the Roman fleet. This was a humiliation that demanded a response. Cerialis decided to wait no longer and invaded Batavia.

At the outset of the rebellion, Rome was heavily preoccupied with major military operations in Judea during the First Jewish–Roman War. However, the siege of Jerusalem that began in April AD 70 was over by early September, and the war was essentially over. When Civilis heard that Jerusalem had fallen, and he realized that Rome would now bring its full resources to bear upon him, Civilis made peace.

Peace talks followed. A bridge was built over the river Nabalia, where the warring parties approached each other on both sides. The general agreements are unknown, but they were favourable to the Batavians, the Batavians were to renew their alliance with the Roman Empire and to levy another eight auxiliary cavalry units. The Batavian capital of Nijmegen was destroyed and its inhabitants ordered to rebuild it a few kilometers downstream, in a defenseless position. Moreover, X Gemina would be stationed close by, to secure peace.

The fate of Civilis is unknown.

== Cultural influence in the Netherlands ==
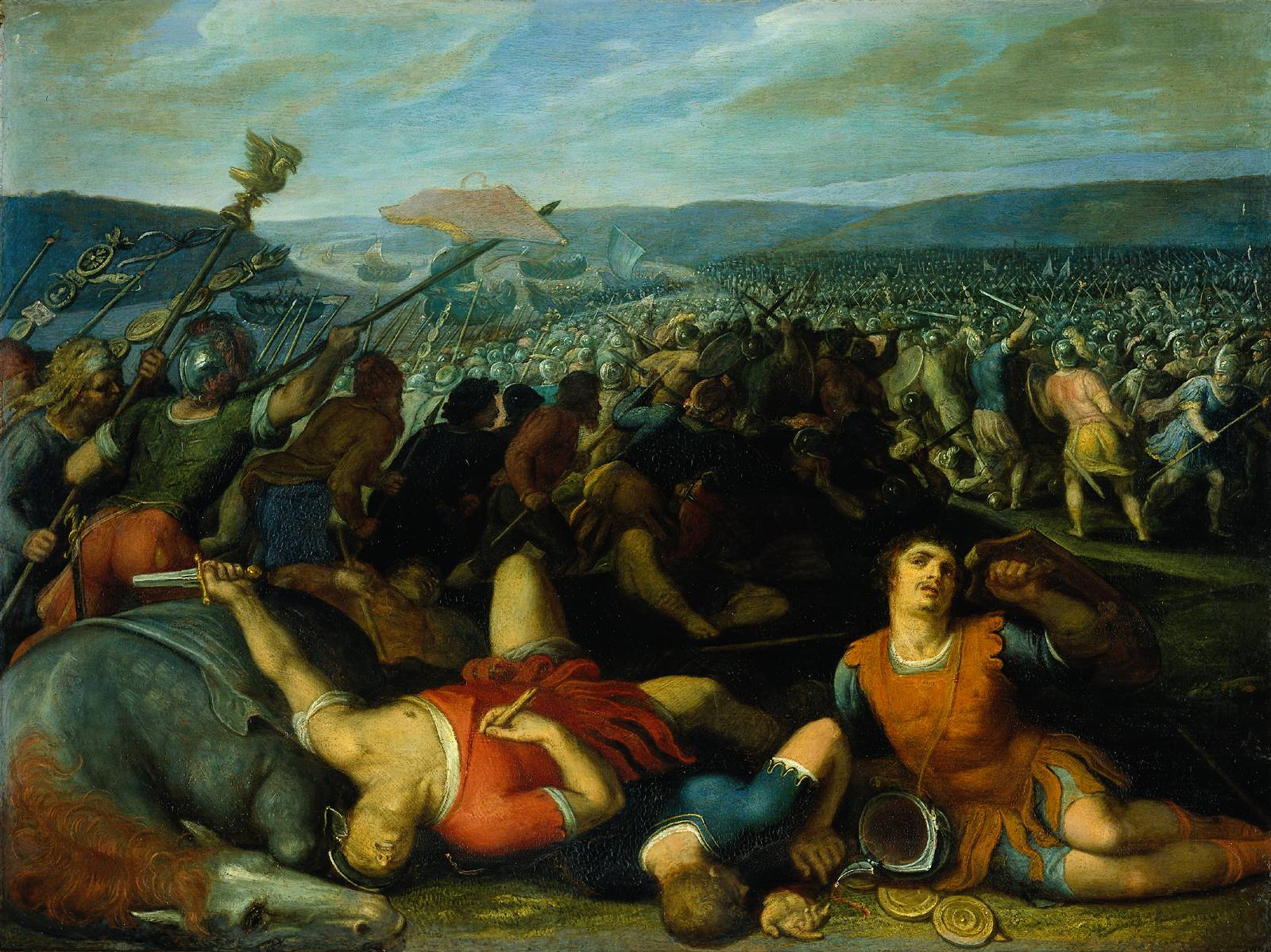
Throughout Dutch history, but especially during the Eighty Years' War, the Batavians have been romantically portrayed as the heroic ancestors of the Dutch people. "The Batavians Defeating the Romans on the Rhine", c. 1613, by Otto van Veen.

Dutch writers in the 17th and 18th centuries saw the rebellion of the independent and freedom-loving Batavians as mirroring the Dutch revolt against Spain and other forms of tyranny. According to this nationalist view, the Batavians were the "true" forefathers of the Dutch, which explains the recurring use of the name over the centuries. Jakarta was named "Batavia" by the Dutch in 1619. The Dutch republic created in 1795 on the basis of French revolutionary principles was called the Batavian Republic.

Hence, leaders of the Revolt of the Batavi were given the status of Dutch National Heroes and their revolt against Roman rule regarded as a precursor of the 16th century Dutch revolt against Spanish rule. The painting by Rembrandt at the top of this page is part of that view of the Revolt of the Batavi. In 1613 Otto van Veen also made a series of sequential paintings about the Revolt of the Batavi.

Even today Batavian is a term sometimes used to describe the Dutch people; this is similar to use of Gallic to describe the French and Teutonic to describe the Germans.

== List of legions involved ==
- Legio I Germanica
- Legio I Adiutrix
- Legio II Adiutrix
- Legio V Alaudae
- Legio VI Victrix
- Legio VIII Augusta
- Legio XI Claudia
- Legio XIII Gemina
- Legio XIV Gemina
- Legio XV Primigenia
- Legio XVI Flavia Firma
- Legio XVI Gallica
- Legio XXI Rapax
