= History of Flanders =

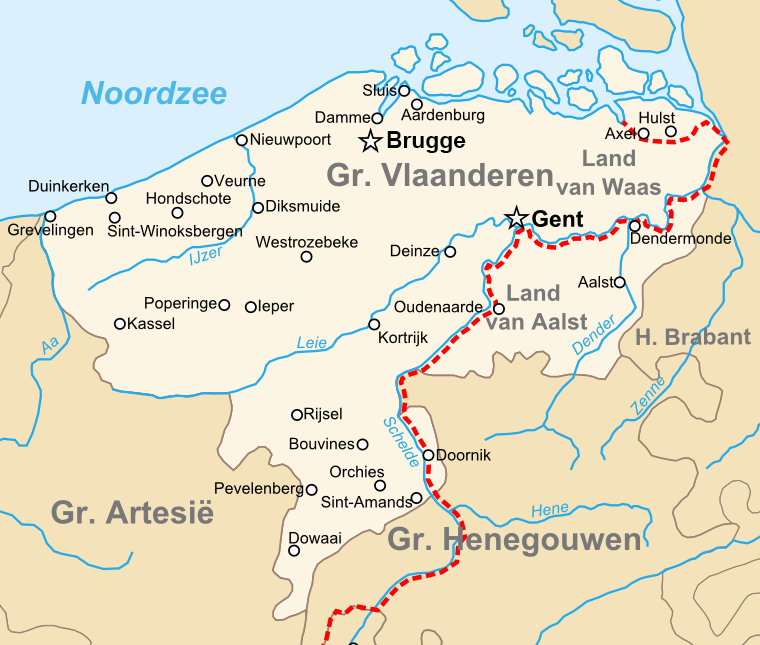
Topographic map of the county of Flanders at the end of the 14th century

Present-day Flanders (geographical), including Brussels, within Europe.

The history of Flanders concerns not only the modern Dutch-speaking part of Belgium, which is now called "Flanders" (Dutch: Vlaanderen), but also several neighbouring territories and populations. Its historical core territory was in western Belgium between the coast and the Scheldt river.

The original medieval county of Flanders spread from the area of Bruges, and later had its capital in nearby Ghent. Its core territories came to include French Flanders, now in France, the Belgian provinces of West and East Flanders, and part of the modern province of Hainaut. During several periods during the middle ages it was a powerful semi-independent state based within the Kingdom of France, but stretching into the neighbouring Holy Roman Empire. It was influential in all neighbouring regions including England, and at its greatest extent its political hegemony stretched north into Zeelandic Flanders in what is now the Netherlands, and deep into French-speaking northern France.

Today, "Flanders" is a term referring to the Flemish Region, which is defined as the Dutch-speaking part of the Kingdom of Belgium. It contains within it the original core of the old county, West Flanders and East Flanders, plus three more culturally-related provinces to the east which were not part of medieval Flanders. These are the provinces of Antwerp and Flemish Brabant which were historically part of the Duchy of Brabant, and the province of Belgian Limburg, which was part of the Prince-Bishopric of Liège. The city of Brussels, historically part of Brabant, is now politically part of the Flemish Community, but not of the Flemish Region.

== Early history ==
Written records of the Flemish region begin in Roman times. Julius Caesar left his Commentaries of the Gaulish War about his time in the region. Caesar described "Belgium" or "Gallia Belgica" as the northernmost of the three distinct parts of Gaul, and all definitions of Flanders are within this large Belgic area. The inhabitants were collectively called Belgae. The boundaries were the North Sea, the Marne and Seine rivers in the southwest, the Ardennes in the southeast, and the Rhine in the north and east.

Within the Belgic region, the old County of Flanders was inhabited by the Menapii (and possibly also some of the Marsacii and Morini) whose territory stretched from the Rhine–Meuse–Scheldt delta to the modern Flemish coast. More inland, across the Scheldt, stretching from Brabant into modern France, lived the Nervii. The most eastern part of modern Flanders was inhabited by the Eburones, whose territory encompassed all or most of modern Belgian Limburg, and also stretched into neighbouring areas of Germany. The exact borders of these tribal groups are not known, but they were all part of a Belgian alliance which fought against Caesar. Later, under Roman rule, each of these tribal groups had its own "civitas" or state, each with a Roman administrative capital. For the Menapii, this was Cassel, and for the Nervii it was Bavay. Both of these are now in northern France and were within the Roman province of Gallia Belgica. The only civitas capital now in Flanders was Tongeren, the capital of the Tungri, who replaced the Eburones (or were the Eburones under a new name).

To what extent these tribes were Celtic, or Germanic, or something else is still subject to historical debate. But as a whole, the Belgic area was certainly influenced by both Celtic and Germanic languages and culture. Caesar describes tribes and individuals who had Celtic names, but also recalls a story that the majority of the Belgae had ancestors who had come from east of the Rhine, some time before the migrations of the Cimbri and Teutones in the second century BCE. Caesar describes northern Belgic tribes such as the Menapii and Nervii as being particularly far removed from Celtic Gaulish norms found in what is today central France, and he specifically refers to their eastern Belgic neighbours, such as the Eburones, as "Cisrhenane Germani". He reported German ancestry amongst these tribes and by the first century BC Germanic languages may have already become prevalent amongst the northern Belgae.

In late classical times, as the Roman empire came under increasing pressure from outside tribal groups, the coast of Flanders itself became a part of the "Saxon Shore", which was a militarized area under attack from seaborne "Saxon" raiders and invaders, coming from the direction of northern Germany. Inland parts of modern Flanders, Brabant and especially Limburg, came under pressure from the Frankish group of Germanic tribes, from across the Rhine. It is at this time that the fortifications underlying Oudenburg were built up. Eventually the inland Salian Franks converted to Christianity and came to rule what is now northern France, and the entire Belgian area. They were treated as successors of Rome, spreading their rule into Germany and even as far as parts of Italy and Spain. But problems continued with invasions and raids from more northerly Germanic Vikings until well into the Middle Ages.

At the end of the 6th and 7th centuries, a new inflow emerged from the western Pas-de-Calais. This area had been germanised in the 5th century and descendants of the Saxons and Franks had settled in future Flanders and the Duchy of Brabant. New groups of germanic settlers also came in from the Netherlands and Germany. Their new settlements often received the name of their germanic leader, with -inga haim added. -Inga haim meant 'the settlement of the tribe of X'. For example: Petegem comes from Petta-inga-haim, which meant 'the settlement of the tribe of Petta'.

The colonisation and germanisation of Flanders took place primarily in the 6th and 7th centuries. In the 7th century, the population-level had risen sufficiently to start rebuilding the religious, military and administrative infrastructure. In the area of linguistics, the situation stabilised so that a large, bilingual region with a linear language border could emerge in the 8th century. In Pas-de-Calais, which had been densely populated a long time, a language barrier had emerged in the 6th–7th century, but in the 9th century a romanisation-movement started that has continued until the present day.

The Christianisation attempts in the 6th century by bishops like Eleutherius and Vedast had largely failed. In the 7th century a new effort was made under influence from King Dagobert I. He appointed several devoted missionaries from the southern parts of his kingdom to his royal domains in the northern parts of his kingdom. The missionaries were tasked with founding monasteries and abbeys there, that were to serve as centers of Christianity in a pagan region. From these centers, the conversion of the local populace could be started.

In 649, Audomar founded an abbey at Sithiu (the Abbey of Saint Bertin) and in 680 Aubertus founded the Abbey of St. Vaast near Arras. The Christianisation of the population was mainly the work of missionaries like Amandus (St. Bavo's Abbey and St. Peter's Abbey in Ghent) and Eligius (coastal region and Antwerp).

== Historical Flanders: County of Flanders ==
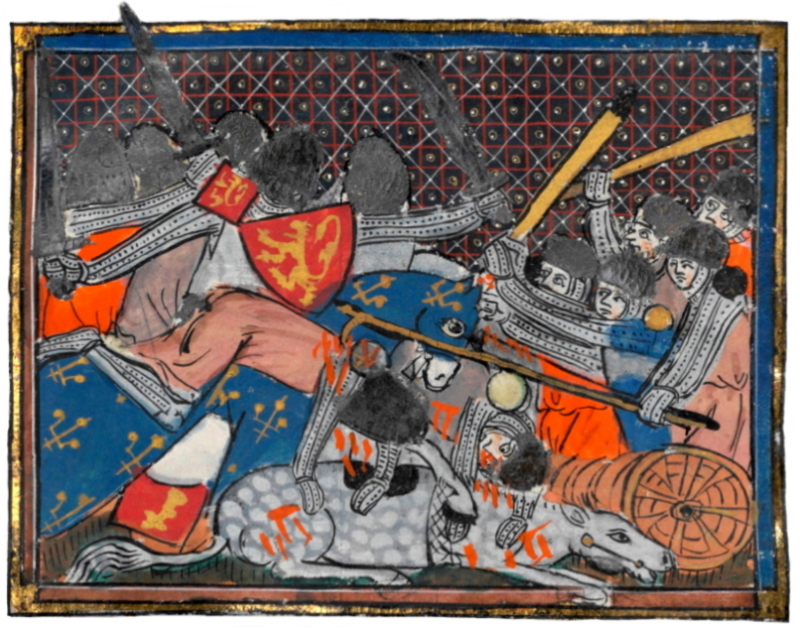
14th-century illustration of French knights charging Flemish footsoldiers (right) at the Battle of the Golden Spurs in 1302.

The County of Flanders was created in the year 862 as a feudal fief in West Francia, the predecessor of the Kingdom of France. After a period of growing power within France, it was divided when its western districts fell under French rule in the late 12th century, with the remaining parts of Flanders came under the rule of the counts of neighbouring Hainaut in 1191.

Increasingly powerful from the 12th century, the territory's autonomous urban communes were instrumental in defeating a French attempt at annexation (1300–1302), finally defeating the French in the Battle of the Golden Spurs (11 July 1302), near Kortrijk. Two years later, the uprising was defeated and Flanders indirectly remained part of the French Crown. Flemish prosperity waned in the following century, however, owing to widespread European population decline following the Black Death of 1348, the disruption of trade during the Anglo-French Hundred Years' War (1338–1453), and increased English cloth production. Flemish weavers had gone over to Worstead and North Walsham in Norfolk in the 12th century and established the woollen industry.

The entire area passed in 1384 to the dukes of Burgundy, who eventually united it politically with their Duchy of Brabant within the Holy Roman Empire. By 1556 the Burgundian Netherlands were being ruled by their successors, the Habsburg kings of Spain. By this time Flanders had been removed from the territory of the Kingdom of France, except that some western districts of Flanders came under French rule under successive treaties of 1659 (Artois), 1668, and 1678.

During the late Middle Ages Flanders' trading towns (notably Ghent, Bruges and Ypres) once again made it one of the richest and most urbanized parts of Europe, weaving the wool of neighbouring lands into cloth for both domestic use and export. As a consequence, a very sophisticated culture developed, with impressive achievements in the arts and architecture, rivaling those of Northern Italy. Ghent, Bruges, Ypres and the Franc of Bruges formed the Four Members, a form of parliament which exercised considerable power in Flanders.

== Flanders in the Low Countries ==
=== Beeldenstorm ===
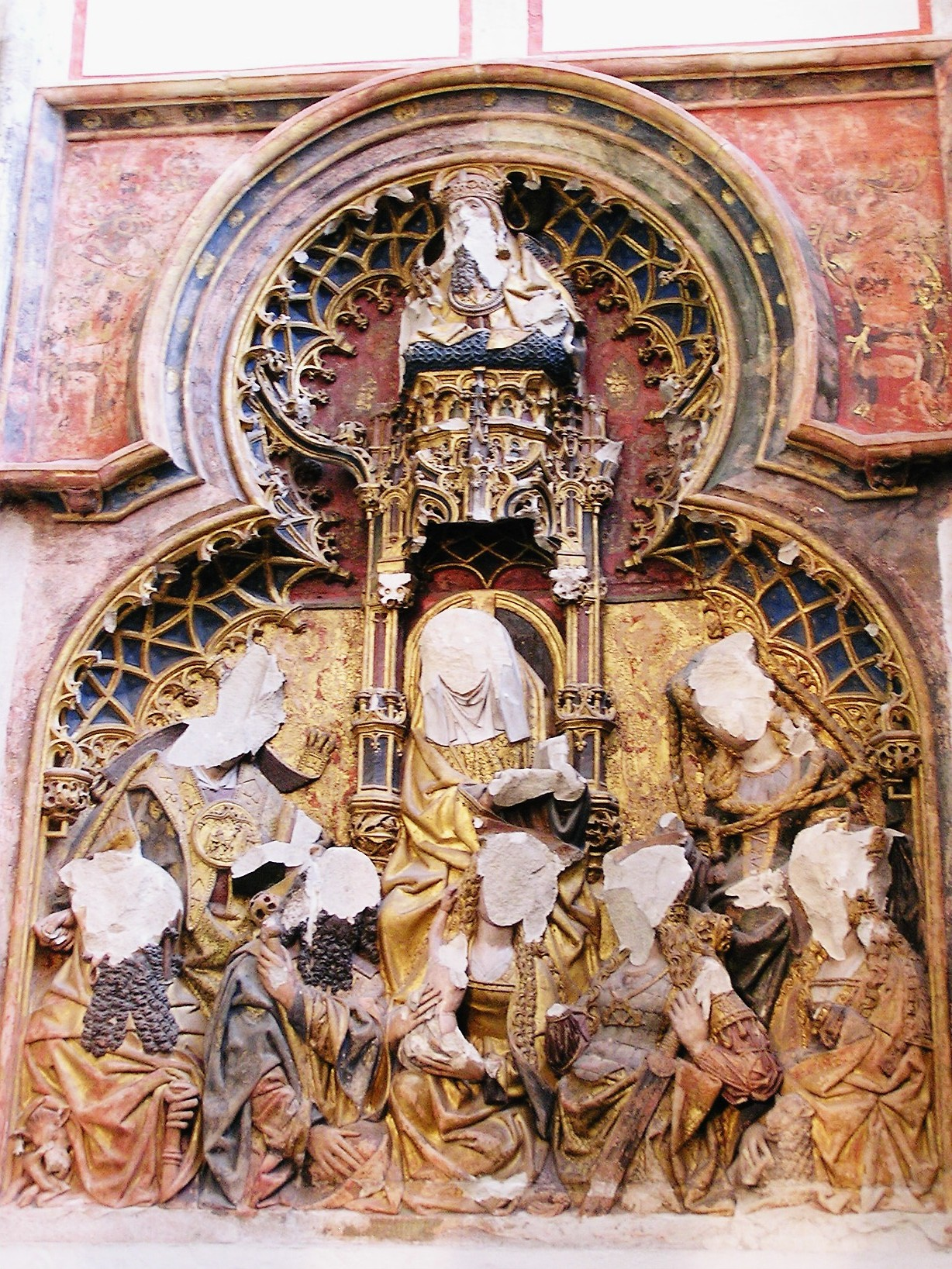
Relief statues in the Cathedral of Saint Martin, Utrecht, attacked in Reformation iconoclasm in the 16th century.

In 1500, Charles V was born in Ghent. He inherited the Seventeen Provinces (1506), Spain (1516) with its colonies and in 1519 was elected Holy Roman Emperor. The Pragmatic Sanction of 1549, issued by Charles V, established the Low Countries as the Seventeen Provinces (or Spanish Netherlands in its broad sense) as an entity separate from the Holy Roman Empire and from France. In 1556 Charles V abdicated due to ill health (he suffered from crippling gout). Spain and the Seventeen Provinces went to his son, king Philip II of Spain.

Meanwhile, Protestantism had reached the Low Countries. Among the wealthy traders of Antwerp, the Lutheran beliefs of the German Hanseatic traders found appeal, perhaps partly for economic reasons. The spread of Protestantism in this city was aided by the presence of an Augustinian cloister (founded 1514) in the St. Andries quarter. Luther, an Augustinian himself, had taught some of the monks, and his works were in print by 1518. The first Lutheran martyrs came from Antwerp. The Reformation resulted in consecutive but overlapping waves of reform: a Lutheran, followed by a militant Anabaptist, then a Mennonite, and finally a Calvinistic movement. These movements existed independently of each other.

Philip II, a devout Catholic and self-proclaimed protector of the Counter-Reformation, suppressed Calvinism in Flanders, Brabant and Holland (what is now approximately Belgian Limburg was part of the Bishopric of Liège and was Catholic de facto). In 1566, the iconoclasm (Beeldenstorm) began as protest against Philip II and promoted the disfigurement of statues and paintings depicting saints. This was associated with the ensuing religious war between Catholics and Protestants, especially the Anabaptists. The Beeldenstorm started in what is now the arrondissement of Dunkirk in French Flanders, with open-air sermons (Dutch: hagepreken). The first took place on the Cloostervelt near Hondschoote and the largest sermon was held near Boeschepe on 12 July 1562. These open-air sermons, mostly of Anabaptist or Mennonite signature, spread through the country. On 10 August 1566, at the end of the pilgrimage from Hondschoote to Steenvoorde, the chapel of the Sint-Laurensklooster (Monastery of Saint Lawrence) was defaced by Protestants. The iconoclasm resulted not only in the destruction of Catholic art, but also cost the lives of many priests. It next spread to Antwerp, and on 22 August, to Ghent. One cathedral, eight churches, twenty-five cloisters, ten hospitals and seven chapels were attacked. From there, it further spread east and north, but in total lasted not even a month.

=== The Eighty Years' War and its consequences ===
Subsequently, Philip II sent the Duke of Alba to the Provinces to repress the revolt. Alba recaptured the southern part of the Provinces, who signed the Union of Arras, which meant that they would accept the Spanish government on condition of more freedom. But the northern part of the provinces signed the Union of Utrecht and settled in 1581 the Republic of the Seven United Netherlands. Spanish troops quickly started fighting the rebels, but before the revolt could be completely defeated, a war between England and Spain had broken out, forcing Philip's Spanish troops to halt their advance. Meanwhile, the Spanish armies had already conquered the important trading cities of Bruges and Ghent. Antwerp, which was then arguably the most important port in the world, also had to be conquered. On 17 August 1585 Antwerp fell. This ended the Dutch Revolt for the (from now on) Southern Netherlands. The United Provinces (the Netherlands proper) fought on in what came to be known as the "Eighty Years' War", until 1648 – the Peace of Westphalia.

While Spain was at war with England, the rebels from the north, strengthened by refugees from the south, started a campaign to reclaim areas lost to Philips II's Spanish troops. They managed to conquer a considerable part of Brabant (the later North Brabant of the Netherlands), and the south bank of the Scheldt estuary (Zeelandic Flanders), before being stopped by Spanish troops. The front line at the end of this war stabilized and became the current border between present-day Belgium and the Netherlands. The Dutch (as they later became known) had managed to reclaim enough of Spanish-controlled Flanders to close off the river Scheldt, effectively cutting Antwerp off from its trade routes.

First the fall of Antwerp to the Spanish and later also the closing of the Scheldt were causes of a considerable emigration of people from the city. Many of the Calvinist merchants of Antwerp and also of other Flemish cities left Flanders and emigrated to the north. A large number of them settled in Amsterdam, which was at the time a smaller port, only of significance in the Baltic trade. In the following years Amsterdam was rapidly transformed into one of the world's most important ports. Because of the contribution of the Flemish exiles to this transformation, the exodus is sometimes described as "creating a new Antwerp".

Flanders and Brabant, due to these events, went into a period of relative decline from the time of the Thirty Years War. In the Northern Netherlands however, the mass emigration from Flanders and Brabant became an important driving force behind the Dutch Golden Age.

=== 1581–1795: The Southern Netherlands ===
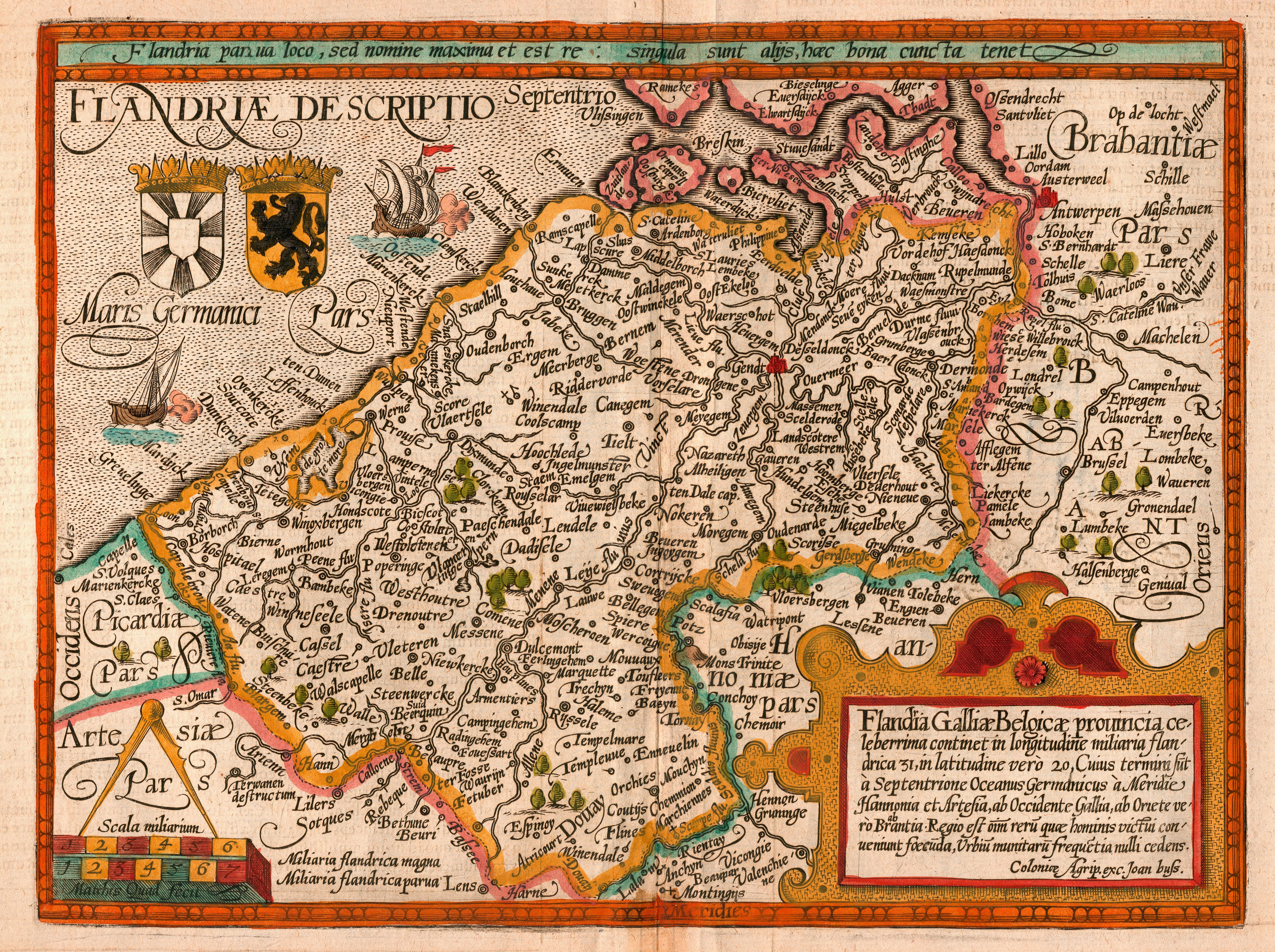
1609 map of the county of Flanders

Although arts remained at a relatively impressive level for another century with Peter Paul Rubens (1577–1640) and Anthony van Dyck, Flanders experienced a loss of its former economic and intellectual power under Spanish, Austrian, and French rule, with heavy taxation and rigid imperial political control compounding the effects of industrial stagnation and Spanish-Dutch and Franco-Austrian conflict. The Southern Netherlands suffered severely under the Spanish Succession war, but under the reign of empress Maria-Theresia these lands economically flourished again. Influenced by the Enlightenment, the Austrian emperor Joseph II was the first sovereign who has been in the Southern Netherlands since king Philip II of Spain left them in 1559.

=== 1795–1815: French Revolution and Napoleonic France ===
In 1794 the French Republican Army started using Antwerp as the northernmost naval port of France, which country officially annexed Flanders the following year as the départements of Lys, Escaut, Deux-Nèthes, Meuse-Inférieure and Dyle. Obligatory (French) army service for all men aged 16–25 was one of the main reasons for the people's uprising against the French in 1798, known as the Boerenkrijg (Peasants' War), with the heaviest fighting in the Campine area.

=== 1815–1830: United Kingdom of the Netherlands ===
After the defeat of Napoleon Bonaparte at the 1815 Battle of Waterloo in Waterloo, Brabant, sovereignty over the Austrian Netherlands – Belgium minus the East Cantons and Luxembourg – was given by the Congress of Vienna (1815) to the United Netherlands (Dutch: Verenigde Nederlanden), the state that briefly existed under Sovereign Prince William I of Orange Nassau, the latter King William I of the United Kingdom of the Netherlands, after the French Empire was driven out of the Dutch territories. The United Kingdom of the Netherlands was born. The Protestant King of the Netherlands, William I, rapidly started the industrialisation of the southern parts of the Kingdom. The political system that was set up, however, slowly but surely failed to forge a true union between the northern and the southern parts of the Kingdom. The southern bourgeoisie mainly was Roman Catholic, in contrast to the mainly Protestant north. Large parts of the southern bourgeoisie also primarily spoke French rather than Dutch.

In 1815 the Dutch Senate was reinstated (Dutch: Eerste Kamer der Staaten Generaal). The nobility, mainly coming from the south, became more and more estranged from their northern colleagues. Resentment grew both among the Roman Catholics from the south and the Protestants from the north and among the powerful liberal bourgeoisie from the south and their more moderate colleagues from the north. On 25 August 1830 (after the showing of the opera 'La Muette de Portici' of Daniel Auber in Brussels) the Belgian Revolution sparked off and became a fact. On 4 October 1830 the Provisional Government (Dutch: Voorlopig Bewind) proclaimed the independence which was later confirmed by the National Congress that issued a new Liberal Constitution and declared the new state a Constitutional Monarchy, under the House of Saxe-Coburg. Flanders now became part of the Kingdom of Belgium, which was recognized by the major European Powers on 20 January 1831. The de facto dissidence was only finally recognized by the United Kingdom of the Netherlands on 19 April 1839.

== Kingdom of Belgium ==
In 1830, the Belgian Revolution led to the splitting up of the two countries. Belgium was confirmed as an independent state by the Treaty of London of 1839, but deprived of the eastern half of Limburg (now Dutch Limburg), and the Eastern half of Luxembourg (now the Grand-Duchy of Luxembourg). Sovereignty over Zeelandic Flanders, south of the Westerscheldt river delta, was left with the Kingdom of the Netherlands, which was allowed to levy a toll on all traffic to Antwerp harbour until 1863.

=== Rise of the Flemish Movement ===
Flag of Flanders

The Belgian Revolution was not well supported in Flanders and even on the 4th of October 1830, when the Belgian independence was eventually declared, Flemish authorities refused to take orders from the new Belgian government in Brussels. Only after Flanders was subdued with the aid of a large French military force one month later, under the leadership of the Count de Pontécoulant, Flanders became a true part of Belgium. The situation with the province of Limburg remained unclear until 1839, when it was finally split between the Netherlands and Belgium.

The French-speaking bourgeoisie showed very little respect for the Flemish part of the population. French became the only official language in Belgium and all secondary and higher education in the Dutch language was abolished. Belgium's co-founder, Charles Rogier, wrote in 1832 to Jean-Joseph Raikem, the minister of justice:

The first principles of a good administration are based upon the exclusive use of one language, and it is evident that the only language of the Belgians should be French. In order to achieve this result, it is necessary that all civil and military functions are entrusted to Walloons and Luxemburgers; this way, the Flemish, temporarily deprived of the advantages of these offices, will be constrained to learn French, and we will hence destroy bit by bit the Germanic element in Belgium. (Note: Les premiers principes d'une bonne administration sont basés sur l'emploi exclusif d'une langue, et il est évident que la seule langue des Belges doit être le français. Pour arriver à ce résultat, il est nécessaire que toutes les fonctions civiles et militaires soient confiées à des Wallons et à des Luxembourgeois; de cette manière, les Flamands, privés temporairement des avantages attachés à ces emplois, seront contraints d'apprendre le français, et l'on détruira ainsi peu à peu l'élément germanique en Belgique.)

In 1838, another co-founder, senator Alexandre Gendebien, even declared that the Flemish were "one of the more inferior races on the Earth, just like the negroes".

In 1834, all people even remotely suspected of being "Flemish minded" or calling for the reunification of the Netherlands were prosecuted and their houses looted and burnt. Flanders, until then a very prosperous European region, was not considered worthwhile for investment and scholarship. A study in 1918 demonstrated that in the first 88 years of its existence, 80% of the Belgian GDP was invested in Wallonia. This led to a widespread poverty in Flanders, forcing roughly 300.000 Flemish to emigrate to Wallonia to start working there in the heavy industry.

All of these events led to a silent uprising in Flanders against the French-speaking domination. But it was not until 1878 that Dutch was allowed to be used for official purposes in Flanders, although French remained the only official language in Belgium.

A remarkable case happened in 1872. Jozef Schoep, a Fleming, presented himself at the Municipal Hall of Sint-Jans-Molenbeek to declare the birth of his son. The civil servant noted the declarations made in Dutch by Schoep in French and also addressed him in French. Schoep didn't understand the language and left the Municipal Hall as a sign of protest, without having signed the necessary documents. The Brussels' court condemned him to a fine of 50 Francs plus tax. Schoep rejected this verdict, accompanied by two solicitors who both stated that they would plead in Dutch. The president of the court at first didn't allow this, but afterwards changed his mind. Eventually, the pleaders were allowed to use Dutch on the condition that their pleas would be translated into French by an official interpreter because the judges didn't know a single word of Dutch. Schoep's solicitors also demanded that the State would have its plea translated, but this was again rejected by the court. Eventually the case went to the supreme court, which ruled that pleading in Dutch would be forbidden. Its verdict was based on the so-called freedom of language and that no-one could ask from any judge to know any other language but French. Mr. Schoep's son had to wait until 1882 before he receiving a legal birth certificate (by which time his father had died).

One year later, Dutch was again allowed in secondary schools; the first of which reopened in 1889. The Flemings had to wait until 1919—after many Flemish soldiers died in the trenches of World War I—to have their language officially recognised and until 1930 before the first Flemish university was reopened.

The first translation of the Belgian constitution in Dutch was not published until 1967.

=== World War I and its consequences ===
Flanders (and Belgium as a whole) saw some of the greatest loss of life on the Western Front of the First World War, in particular from the three battles of Ypres. Due to the hundreds of thousands of casualties at Ypres, the poppies that sprang up from the battlefield afterwards, later immortalised in the Canadian poem "In Flanders Fields", written by John McCrae, have become a symbol for lives lost in war.

Flemish feeling of identity and consciousness grew through the events and experiences of war. The occupying German authorities took several Flemish-friendly measures. More importantly, the experiences of many Dutch-speaking soldiers on the front led by French-speaking officers catalysed Flemish emancipation. The French-speaking officers often gave orders in French only. The resulting suffering is still remembered by Flemish organizations during the yearly Yser pilgrimage in Diksmuide at the monument of the Yser Tower.

=== Right-wing nationalism in the interbellum and World War II ===
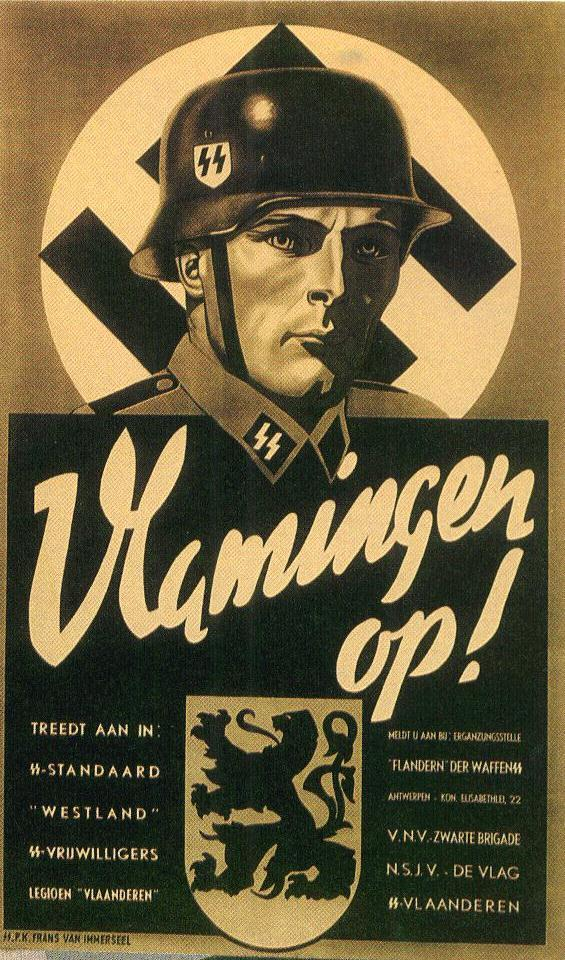
Recruitment poster for the Algemeene-SS Vlaanderen with the slogan "Flemish, onwards!"

During the interbellum and World War II, several fascist and/or national-socialistic parties emerged in Belgium, of which the Flemish ones drew upon the feeling of discrimination by the Wallonians against the Flemish. Since these parties were promised more rights for the Flemish by the German government during World War II, some of them collaborated with the Nazi regime. Two SS formations, the Algemeene-SS Vlaanderen and the 27th SS "Langemarck" Volunteer Division were formed of Flemish collaborators and served on the Eastern Front. Flemish volunteers for the SS were kept separate from Walloon ones who were made into a separate unit, the 28th "Wallonien" Grenadier Division.

Nevertheless, many Flemish people were also involved in the resistance, joining local organizations like the Kempische Legioen (KL) in Limburg, and support from Flemish resistance members of the Witte Brigade and the Nationale Koninklijke Beweging (NKB) allowed the Allied armies to capture the vital port of Antwerp intact in 1944.

After the war, collaborators (or people who were "Zwart", "Black" during the war) were prosecuted and punished, among them many Flemish Nationalists. Up until this day Flemish Nationalism is often associated with right-wing and fascist ideologies.

=== Flemish autonomy ===
After World War II, the differences between Dutch-speaking and French-speaking Belgians became clear in a number of conflicts, such as the question whether King Leopold III should return (which most Flemings supported but not the Walloons) and the use of Dutch in the Catholic University of Leuven. As a result, several state reforms took place in the second half of the 20th century, which transformed the unitary Belgium into a federal state with communities, regions and language areas. This resulted also in the establishment of a Flemish Parliament and Government.

Several Flemish parties still advocate for more Flemish autonomy, some even for Flemish independence (see Partition of Belgium), whereas the French-speakers would like to keep the current state as it is. Recent governments (such as Verhofstadt I Government) have transferred certain federal competences to the regional governments.

On 13 December 2006, a spoof news broadcast by the Belgian Francophone public broadcasting station RTBF declared that Flanders had decided to declare independence from Belgium.

The 2007 federal elections showed more support for Flemish autonomy. All the political parties that advocated a significant increase of Flemish autonomy increased their share of the votes and seats in the Belgian parliament. This was especially the case for Christian Democratic and Flemish party and New Flemish Alliance (N-VA) (forming a cartel). The 2009 regional elections have strengthened the parties in favor a significant increase of Flemish autonomy: CD&V and N-VA were the clear winners. N-VA became even the largest party in Flanders and Belgium during the 2010 federal elections.

These victories for the advocates of much more Flemish autonomy are very much in parallel with opinion polls that show a structural increase in popular support for their agenda. Since 2006, certain polls have started showing a majority in favor of Flemish independence. Those polls are not yet representative, but they point to a significant long-term trend.

Several negotiators having come and gone since the federal elections of 10 June 2007 without diminishing the disagreements between Flemish and Walloon politicians regarding a further State reform, caused difficulties for the formation of the federal government and ultimately led to the fall of the government and new elections on 13 June 2010. These were won by the pro-independence party of the N-VA in Flanders. The long-lasting government formation of 2010 broke the previous record of 2007.

== See also ==
- History of Belgium
- History of Wallonia
- History of Belgian Limburg
