= Alien Sweetheart =

Studio album by Zornik
- Released: 2005
- Studio: Motormusic (Koningshooikt); Z-Rooms (Zonhoven)
- Genre: Pop rock
- Length: 1:06:29
- Label: Parlophone; EMI Belgium
- Producer: Phil Vinall; Koen Buyse

Zornik chronology
One Armed Bandit (2004)	Alien Sweetheart (2005)	Crosses (2007)

Singles from Alien Sweetheart
- 1. "I Feel Alright" Released: 2005; 2. "Keep Me Down" Released: 2005

Alien Sweetheart is the third studio album by Belgian rock band Zornik. It was released in 2005 through Parlophone/EMI Belgium. Recording sessions took place at Motormusic in Koningshooikt with additional recording at Z-Rooms in Zonhoven. Production was handled by Phil Vinall and Koen Buyse.

The album peaked at number 3 on the Belgian Albums chart of Flemish region. It was supported with two singles: "I Feel Alright" and "Keep Me Down". Its lead single, "I Feel Alright", reached number 38 on the Belgian Singles chart of Flemish region.

== Track listing ==
No.	Title	Length
1.	"I Feel Alright"	4:22
2.	"Keep Me Down"	3:45
3.	"Monday Afternoon (Acoustic)"	4:20
4.	"Another Year"	4:35
5.	"Escape"	4:10
6.	"Wake Up"	3:22
7.	"Things Are Changing"	4:28
8.	"So Much More to Come"	4:42
9.	"Hate/Like"	4:03
10.	"Q's No A's"	6:05
11.	"Believe in Me (Acoustic)"	4:35
12.	"Miracles (Acoustic)"	4:12
13.	"Goodbye (Acoustic)"	2:55
14.	"Scared of Yourself (Acoustic)"	4:41
15.	"Are You a Junkie? (Acoustic)"	6:14
Total length:		1:06:29

== Personnel ==
- Koen Buyse – songwriter, vocals, guitar, strings arrangement, effects, producer
- Bart Van Lierde – electric bass, double bass
- Davy Deckmijn – drums, percussion
- Steven Kolacny – piano, strings arrangement
- Eva Vermeeren – violin
- Cédric Murrath – violin
- Marc Pijpops – viola
- Hans Vandaele – cello
- Phil Vinall – producer, mixing
- Denis Moulin – engineering
- Jo Francken – engineering
- Mattias Vos – engineering assistant
- Howie Weinberg – mastering
- Jan Doggen – photography
- Guus Fluit – A&R

== Charts ==
=== Weekly charts ===
Chart (2005)	Peak position
Belgian Albums (Ultratop Flanders)	3

=== Year-end charts ===
Chart (2005)	Position
Belgian Albums (Ultratop Flanders)	44
