= The Place Where You Will Find Us =

Studio album by Zornik
- Released: August 19, 2002
- Studio: BSB Studio (Brussels); Motormusic (Koningshooikt)
- Genre: Rock
- Length: 50:42
- Label: Parlophone Belgium
- Producer: Guus Fluit; Koen Buyse

Zornik chronology
The Place Where You Will Find Us (2002)	One-Armed Bandit (2004)

Singles from The Place Where You Will Find Us
- 1. "Hey Girl" Released: 2001; 2. "Love Affair" Released: 2001; 3. "It's So Unreal" Released: 2001; 4. "You Move Me" Released: 2002

The Place Where You Will Find Us is the debut studio album by the Belgian rock band Zornik. It was released on 19 August 2002 through Parlophone Belgium. Recording sessions took place at BSB Studio in Brussels and Motormusic in Koningshooikt. Production was helmed by Guus Fluit and Koen Buyse.

The album reached the top spot on the Belgian Ultratop hit parade in the Flanders region. It spawned four singles: "Hey Girl", "Love Affair", "It's So Unreal" and "You Move Me".

== Track listing ==
All tracks are written by Koen Buyse

No.	Title	Length
1.	"Hey Girl"	4:11
2.	"Once Again"	3:48
3.	"This Song Is Just for You"	4:14
4.	"It's So Unreal"	4:02
5.	"The Demons You Have Liked"	3:51
6.	"Instru 7 Turns 15"	3:10
7.	"You Move Me"	3:49
8.	"Love Affair"	3:41
9.	"Sometimes"	4:29
10.	"Wasting Time"	4:56
11.	"Go Your Way"	3:36
12.	"King of the Town"	2:59
13.	"Hey Girl" (featuring Tom Helsen)	3:56
Total length:		50:42

== Personnel ==
- Koen Buyse – songwriter, vocals, guitar, producer
- Kristof Vanduren – bass
- Davy Deckmijn – drums
- Marijn Horemans – drums (tracks: 1, 4, 8)
- Tom Helsen – vocals (track 13)
- Guus Fluit – producer
- Marc François – engineering (tracks: 1–7, 9–12)
- Zmago Smon – mixing (track 8)
- Jan Verschoren – engineering (track 13)
- René Schardt – mastering
- Koen Bauters – photography
- Cassandre Sturbois – photography
- Michel Lenaerts – management

== Charts ==
=== Weekly charts ===
Chart (2002)	Peak position
Belgian Albums (Ultratop Flanders)	1

=== Year-end charts ===
Chart (2002)	Position
Belgian Albums (Ultratop Flanders)	37
