= Satisfaction Kills Desire =

Studio album by Zornik
- Released: 2010
- Studio: Studio Black Box (France); Art Sound Studios (Belgium)
- Genre: Rock
- Label: Rocker Boy Records; Parlophone; EMI
- Producer: Koen Buyse; Peter Deimel (co.)

Zornik chronology
Crosses (2007)	Satisfaction Kills Desire (2010)	Less > More (2012)

Singles from Satisfaction Kills Desire
- 1. "Walk" Released: 2010; 2. "The Enemy" Released: 2010; 3. "Pin Me Down" Released: 2011

Satisfaction Kills Desire is the fifth studio album by the Belgian rock band Zornik. It was released in 2011 via Rocker Boy Records and EMI. Recording sessions took place at Studio Black Box in France and Art Sound Studios in Belgium. Production was handled by Koen Buyse with co-producer Peter Deimel.

The album peaked at number 5 on the Belgian Albums chart of Flemish region. It was supported with three singles: "Walk", "The Enemy" and "Pin Me Down".

== Track listing ==
No.	Title	Length
1.	"I Want It All"
2.	"Something in the Way"
3.	"The Enemy"
4.	"Final Curtain"
5.	"Satisfaction Kills Desire"
6.	"Babylon"
7.	"It All Comes Back"
8.	"Pin Me Down"
9.	"Walk"
10.	"More Than This"
11.	"Underground"
12.	"Wild Eyes"

== Personnel ==
- Koen Buyse – vocals, guitar, producer, mixing
- Tom Barbier – guitar, keyboards
- Bas Remans – bass, mixing
- Davy Deckmijn – drums
- Peter Deimel – co-producer, engineering
- Filip Heurckmans – mixing (track 9)
- Tobias Deitmer – programming
- Jean-Pierre Chalbos – mastering

== Charts ==
Chart (2010)	Peak position
Belgian Albums (Ultratop Flanders)	5
