= Crosses (Zornik album) =

Studio album by Zornik
- Released: May 13, 2007
- Studio: Temple Studios (Malta)
- Genre: Rock
- Length: 46:55
- Label: EMI Music Belgium
- Producer: Bas Remans; Koen Buyse

Zornik chronology
Alien Sweetheart (2005)	Crosses (2007)	Satisfaction Kills Desire (2010)

Singles from Crosses
- 1. "Black Hope Shot Down" Released: 2007; 2. "The Backseat" Released: 2007; 3. "Get Whatever You Want" Released: 2007

Crosses is the fourth studio album by the Belgian rock band Zornik. It was released on May 13, 2007 via Parlophone/EMI Music Belgium. Recording sessions took place at Temple Studios in Malta. Production was handled by members Koen Buyse and Bas Remans.

The album peaked at number 3 on the Belgian Albums chart of Flemish region. It was supported with three singles: "Black Hope Shot Down", "The Backseat" and "Get Whatever You Want". Its lead single, "Black Hope Shot Down", reached number 21 on the Belgian Singles chart of Flemish region.

== Track listing ==
All tracks are written by Koen Buyse

No.	Title	Length
1.	"Lost and Found"	4:04
2.	"Black Hope Shot Down"	3:19
3.	"The Backseat"	3:37
4.	"Sad She Said"	5:10
5.	"All of This Revisited"	3:49
6.	"Fed Up"	3:10
7.	"Fear in America"	3:21
8.	"Straight to the Bone"	3:08
9.	"There She Goes"	4:42
10.	"Go/No"	4:22
11.	"Get Whatever You Want"	4:01
12.	"I Will Never Be This Way"	4:12
Total length:		46:55

== Personnel ==
- Koen Buyse – songwriter, vocals, guitar, keyboards, producer, mixing
- Tom Barbier – guitar
- Bas Remans – bass, producer, mixing
- Davy Deckmijn – drums
- Maarten Heynderickx – engineering, mixing
- Eline Verdeyen – illustration
- Koen Bauters – photography

== Charts ==
=== Weekly charts ===
Chart (2007)	Peak position
Belgian Albums (Ultratop Flanders)	3

=== Year-end charts ===
Chart (2007)	Position
Belgian Albums (Ultratop Flanders)	23
