= Konings (distillery) =

Konings is a company that was originally founded in 1946 in Zonhoven as a distillery. Thanks to specific acquisitions, including that of Smeets Distillery, it positioned itself as a major player in the distilling industry. Since 2007 the company has focussed on the production and packaging of fruit juices.

== History ==
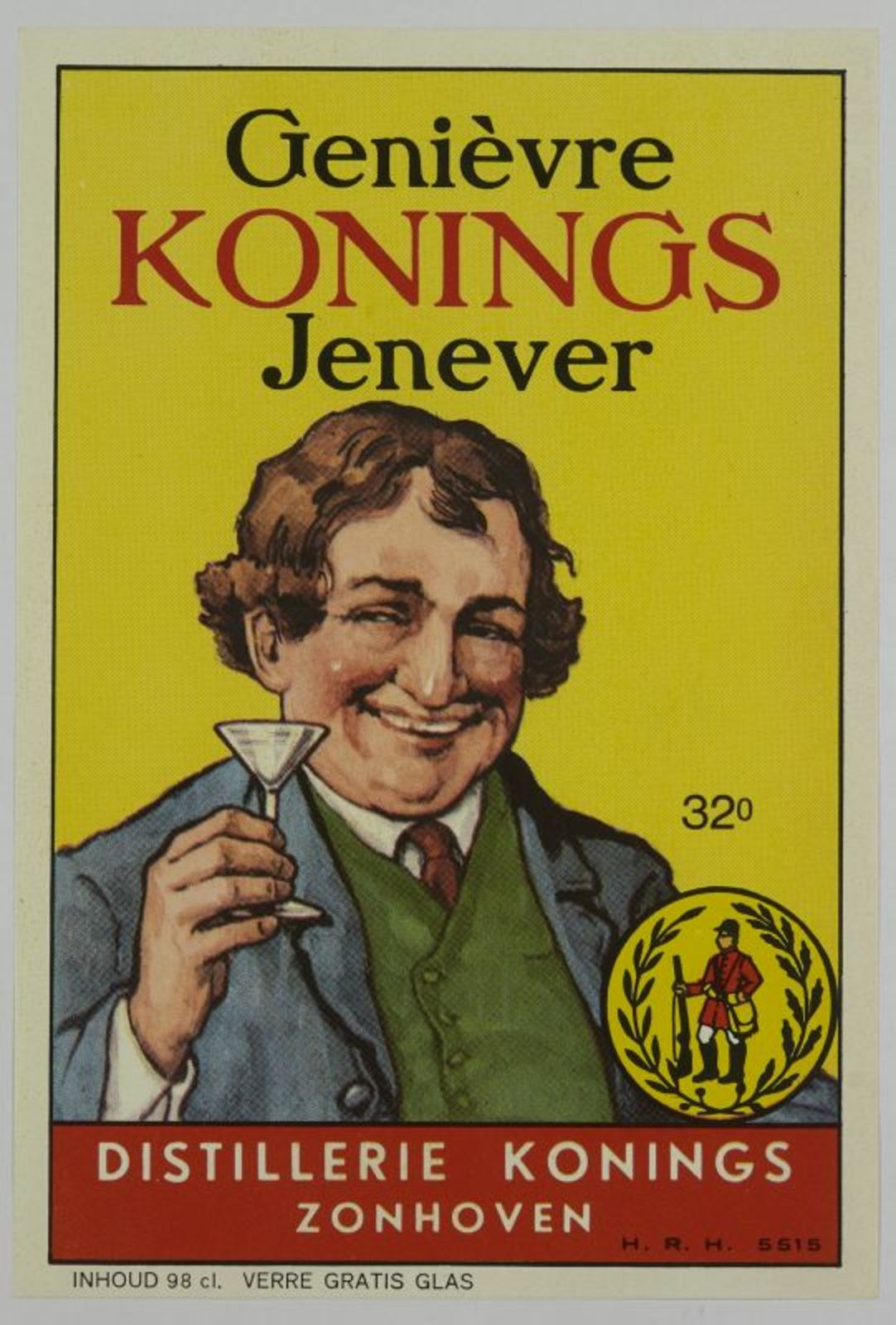
Label 'Genièvre Konings Jenever' of distillery Konings, Zonhoven, 1965

In 1945, Michel Konings established Distillery 't Jagerke in an old garage. During the latter days of the World War II, its main customer was Field-Marshal Montgomery's headquarters, located in Zonhoven. The distillery's phone number was 15 H.R. Hasselt 5515.

1947 was a transformative year as the distillery hired its first employee. By 1957, the distillery evolved from a one-man operation into a private limited company.

In 1960, it further transitioned into a public limited company, Konings NV, expanding its activities to include ciders and sparkling wine production. In 1983, Konings NV acquired Nelissen Distillery in Hasselt. This was followed in 1987 by the takeover of Trudo Fruit Juices, marking the company's entry into the fruit juice market. In 1995, Konings NV. expanded into the dairy industry by taking over Lilac and in 2001, it acquired Smeets Distillery in Hasselt.

The acquisition of Smeets added the Smeets brand to Konings’ range of products. In 2002, Konings launched an advertising and image campaign to promote the Smeets brand, aiming to position it as a high-quality, fairly-priced product.
