= Jos Vandeloo =

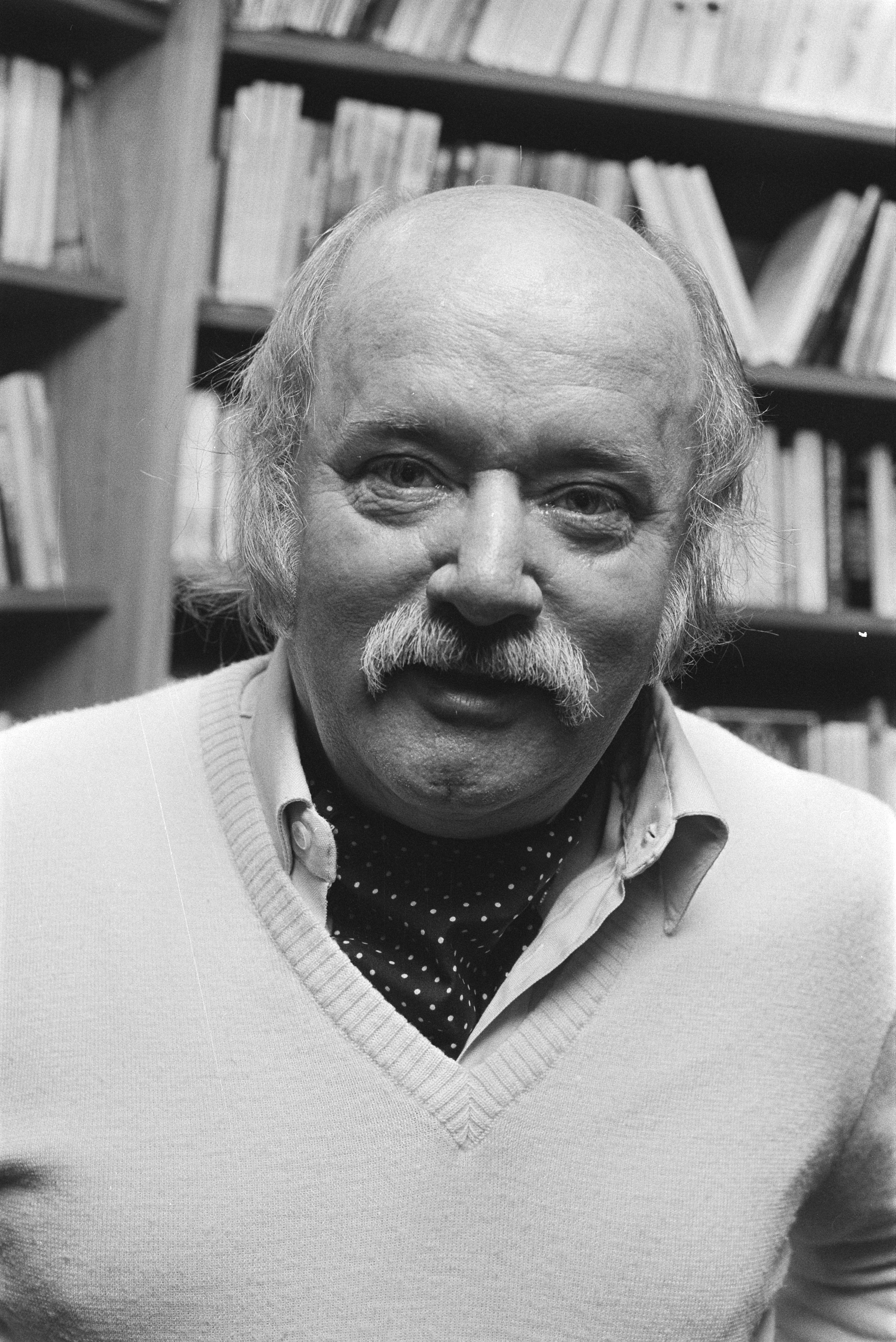
Jos Vandeloo in 1982

Josephus Albertus "Jos" Vandeloo (5 September 1925 – 5 October 2015) was a Belgian writer and poet.

== Biography ==
He grew up in a mining family from Zonhoven and graduated as a chemist for the mining industry.

After the war he started working in the mine as a coal specialist and for this he travelled throughout Europe (up to 1953). At the same time he also studied Dutch and French literature at the Royal Academy and the Higher Institute for Arts in Antwerp.

After his career in the mine (as deputy director), he became director of the Belgian division of the publisher Manteau, which published a number of his works. In the sixties he was for a while sports commentator for the Belgian Radio and Television (BRT). Since 1963 he has lived in Mortsel near Antwerp.

He made his debut in 1955 with the collection of poems: Speelse parade (Playful parade) and became well known with the stories De muur (The wall) en Het gevaar (The danger). In 1982, he devoted himself full-time to writing.

In his work he generally describes the negative impact of modern society, such as loneliness and alienation and he tries to strive for an idealistic, paradisaical environment. He not only wrote novels, stories and poetry but also wrote several screenplays for television and also theatre plays. His work has been translated into several European languages (such as Russian and Romanian) and he has won several awards.

== Bibliography ==
- Het kruis dat wij dragen (1953)
- Speelse parade (1955)
- Wij waren twee soldaten (1955)
- Woorden der doofstommen (1957)
- De muur (1958)
- Wachten op het groene licht (1959)
- Het gevaar (1960)
- De vijand (1962)
- Zeng (1962)
- De croton (1963)
- Het huis der onbekenden (1963)
- Dadels voor een vizier (1965)
- Een mannetje uit Polen (1965)
- Vlaamse poëzie (1965)
- Copernicus of De bloemen van het geluk (1967)
- De Coladrinkers (1968)
- De 10 minuten van Stanislas Olo (1969)
- De glimlach van een vlinder (1969)
- De week van de kapiteins (1969)
- Nieuwe avonturen van Hokus en Pokus (1970)
- Bent u ook zo'n Belg (1972)
- Waarom slaap je, liefje (1972)
- De muggen (1973)
- Schilfers hebben scherpe kanten (1974)
- Splitter haben scharfe Kanten (1974)
- Mannen (1975)
- Vrouwen (1978)
- De Engelse les (1980)
- Sarah (1982)
- Les Hollandais sont là (1985)
- Opa's droom (1987)
- De weg naar de Ardennen (1988)
- Hong Kong (1988)
- De beklimming van de Mont Ventoux (1990)
- Kolonie of reservaat (essay, 1992)
- De vogelvrouw (1993)
- De man die niet van de deurwaarder hield en andere verhalen (1995)
- De liefdesboom (1998)

== See also ==
- Flemish literature

== Sources ==
- Jos Vandeloo at IMDb
- Jos Vandeloo (in Dutch)
- Jos Vandeloo (in Dutch)
- G.J. van Bork en P.J. Verkruijsse, De Nederlandse en Vlaamse auteurs (1985)
