= One Armed Bandit =

One-Armed Bandit

Studio album by Zornik
- Released: February 25, 2004
- Studio: Temple Studios (Malta)
- Genre: Rock
- Length: 1:07:26
- Label: Parlophone
- Producer: Phil Vinall; Koen Buyse (co.)

Zornik chronology
The Place Where You Will Find Us (2002)	One-Armed Bandit (2004)	Alien Sweetheart (2005)

Singles from One-Armed Bandit
- 1. "Goodbye" Released: 2004; 2. "Scared of Yourself" Released: 2004; 3. "Believe in Me" Released: 2004

One Armed Bandit is the second studio album by the Belgian rock band Zornik. It was released in 2004 via Parlophone. Recording sessions took place at Temple Studios in Malta. Production was handled by Phil Vinall with Koen Buyse serving as co-producer.

The album repeated the success of the previous album, The Place Where You Will Find Us, climbing to first place in the Belgian Ultratop hit parade in the Flanders region. The remixed version of off the album's second single, "Scared of Yourself" done by Peter Luts, reached number three on the Ultratop 50 Singles (Flemish chart).

== Track listing ==
All tracks are written by Koen Buyse

No.	Title	Length
1.	"Monday Afternoon"	4:02
2.	"Scared of Yourself"	3:41
3.	"Chews You Up, Spits You Out"	4:28
4.	"Believe in Me"	3:55
5.	"Closer"	4:37
6.	"Miracles"	4:21
7.	"The Place (6 Down, 6 to Go)"	2:21
8.	"Better off Without You"	4:21
9.	"We Are Lost"	3:46
10.	"Destination Zero"	4:38
11.	"Goodbye"	4:24
12.	"What's Wrong?"	4:19
13.	"Dreams Don't Come Easy"	18:33
Total length:		1:07:26

== Personnel ==
- Koen Buyse – songwriter, vocals, guitar, keyboards, arranger, co-producer
- Bas Remans – bass guitar
- Davy Deckmijn – drums, percussion
- Alison Galea – backing vocals (track 5)
- Joanne Aquila – violin (tracks: 1, 2, 4, 12)
- Jean Pierre Micallef-Grimaud – violin (tracks: 1, 2, 4, 12)
- Paul Micallef-Grimaud – cello (tracks: 1, 2, 4, 12)
- Phil Vinall – producer, mixing
- Guiseppe Fellegara – engineering
- Chris Blair – mastering
- Koen Bauters – photography

== Charts ==
=== Weekly charts ===
Chart (2004)	Peak position
Belgian Albums (Ultratop Flanders)	1

=== Year-end charts ===
Chart (2004)	Position
Belgian Albums (Ultratop Flanders)	16
