= Zornik =

Belgian rock band

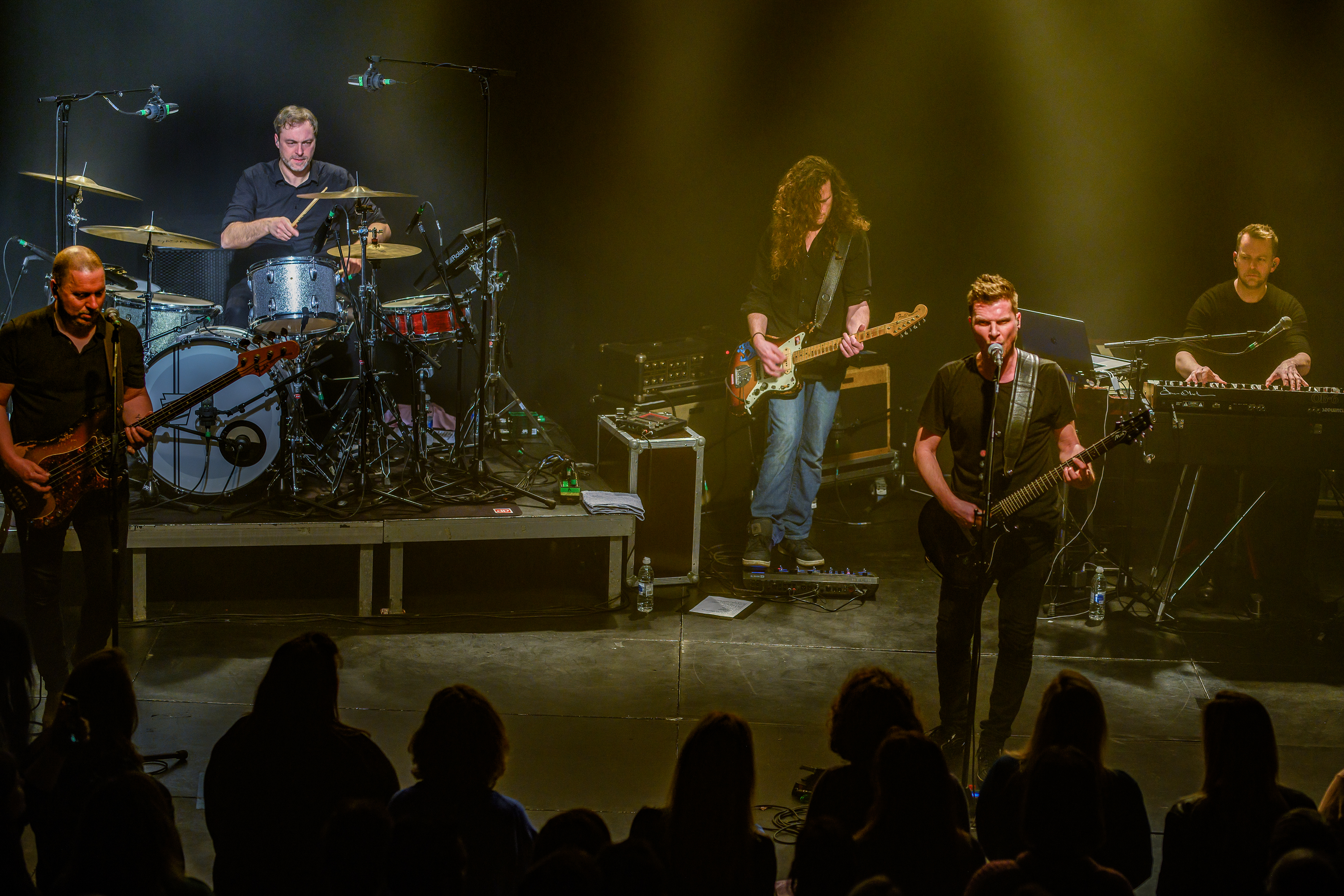
- Zornik in 2023

Background information
- Origin: Zonhoven, Belgium
- Genres: Rock
- Years active: 1999–present
- Members: Koen Buyse; Davy Deckmijn; Bas Remans; Tom Barbier
- Past members: Kristof Vanduren; Marijn Horemans; Bart Van Lierde
- Website: zornik.com

Zornik is a Belgian rock band. It was formed in 1999 by singer and guitarist Koen Buyse, drummer Marijn Horemans and bass guitarist Kristof Vanduren.

== History ==
The band made it in 1999 to the finals of HUMO's Rock Rally rock contest, under the name Zornik Breknov. There, the band was spotted by Parlophone Belgium and MTC Management. This led to the recording of their first EP, Love Affair. It stayed in Belgium's leading alternative charts at Studio Brussel, for more than 10 weeks since March 2001. The second EP, It's so unreal, remained in the alternative charts for more than 20 weeks, reaching number 3.

Zornik played in 2001 at important summer festivals: Eurorock, Marktrock and Pukkelpop. They gave a business presentation at A2A and also appeared at Eurosonic. In October 2001 they were awarded the TMF Award for Most Promising Band of the year. Soon after, Marijn left the band and was replaced on drums by Davy Deckmijn.

Their CD-single Hey Girl was released early December and became the number one in the alternative charts for six weeks. Their debut album The Place Where You Will Find Us was released in February 2002. This album rocketed to the #1 spot in the Belgian charts, where it stayed for 2 weeks.

The single You Move Me (released June 2002) also hit the no. 2 spot in the alternative charts after just two weeks. Zornik played all major festivals in Belgium (Rock Werchter, Marktrock, Dour, Lokerse Feesten), as well as almost 20 shows in the Netherlands, both clubs and festivals (Lowlands), festivals in Germany (Bizarre, Hurricane and Southside) and Austria, clubs in Norway, Denmark and Sweden (with Muse) and the UK. In October 2002, they were awarded the TMF Award for Best Rock Group.

In 2003, Kristof decided to leave the band. For the summer festival shows, he was replaced by Bas (Millionaire) who also joined the band in the studio for the recordings of the second album, One-Armed Bandit (2004). This album was a lot more experimental than the first one. For the tour, bass was played by Bart Van Lierde (also known as bass guitarist for Zita Swoon).

In 2005 Zornik went acoustic for a theater tour, creating the album "Alien Sweetheart". The theater tour: "All Strings Attached", was their first full acoustic live performance and was a huge success.

In the concerts they did on festivals in the summer of 2006, Bas rejoined them to play bass.

In the spring of 2007, the band once again started recording a new rock album. They went to Malta again, and in the beginning of April the new album, Crosses was released. They gave a show in the brand new Lotto Arena in Antwerp, which they said to be their best show up to then.

A best-of collection, 4.000.000 Minutes of Zornik (2008), was the band's next full-length release. It was also a big hit, reaching the Top Ten and spawning the new hit single "4 Million Minutes."

Their album Blinded By The Diamonds was released in September 2015.

To mark their 20th anniversary, the band performed their 20 most popular singles in 2021 and 2022. They performed on stage at the Ancienne Belgique, Trix and at different festivals.

== Discography ==
=== Albums ===
| Date of release | Title | Label | Belgium Ultra Top 50 |
|---|---|---|---|
| 2002 | The Place Where You Will Find Us | Parlophone | |
| 2004 | One Armed Bandit | Parlophone | |
| 2005 | Alien Sweetheart | Parlophone | |
| 2007 | Crosses | Parlophone | 4 |
| 2010 | Satisfaction Kills Desire | Parlophone | |
| 2012 | Less > More | Parlophone | |
| 2015 | Blinded by the diamonds | Zornik | |
| 2022 | 20 Years Of Zornik (live album) | Zornik | |

| Title | Single/full CD | Date |
|---|---|---|
| You move me | single | 2002 |
| One-armed Bandit | Full-CD | 2004 |
| Goodbye | single | 2004 |
| Scared of Yourself | single | 2004 |
| Believe in me | single | 2004 |
| Alien Sweetheart | Full-CD | 2005 |
| I Feel Alright | single | 2005 |
| Keep me down | single | 2005 |
| Crosses | Full-CD | 2007 |
| Black Hope Shot Down | single | 2007 |
| 4.000.000 Minutes of Zornik | best-of | 2008 |
| Satisfaction Kills Desire | Full-CD | 2010 |

=== Singles ===
| Year | Song | Album |
|---|---|---|
| 2001 | "Love Affair" | The Place Where You Will Find Us |
| 2002 | "It's So Unreal" | The Place Where You Will Find Us |
| 2002 | "Hey Girl" | The Place Where You Will Find Us |
| 2002 | "You Move Me" | The Place Where You Will Find Us |
| 2004 | "Goodbye" | One Armed Bandit |
| 2004 | "Scared of Yourself" | One Armed Bandit |
| 2005 | "I Feel Alright" | Alien Sweetheart |
