= Treaty of Zonhoven =

1833 treaty between the Netherlands and Belgium

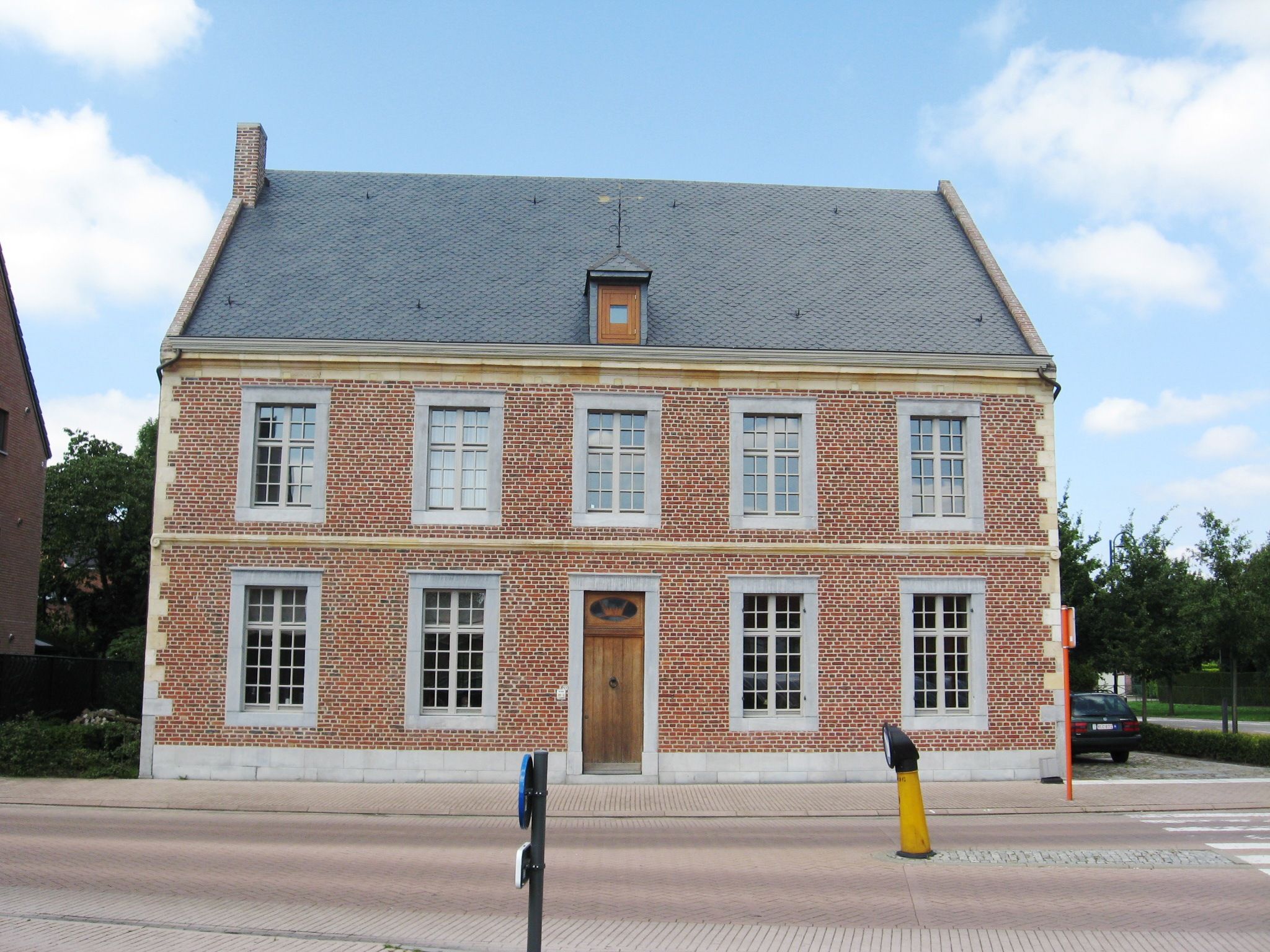
De Franse Kroon, the house where the Treaty of Zonhoven was signed in 1833

The Treaty of Zonhoven was signed in Zonhoven on November 18, 1833, between representatives of the United Kingdom of the Netherlands and Belgium. The accord altered an agreement made during the Convention of London (May 21, 1833) whereby navigation of the rivers Scheldt and Meuse would remain free and open. However, the convention did not establish a definitive treaty, and Belgium owed dues to the Netherlands for its use of the Scheldt. As a result, the Treaty of Zonhoven established special regulations over the use of the Meuse by the signatories. Overall, the accord helped to re-establish bilateral relations between the Netherlands and Belgium.

== See also ==
- List of treaties

== Sources ==
- Adolphus William Ward and George Walter Prothero. The Cambridge Modern History. Cambridge: Cambridge University Press, 1907.
