= Kempisch Legioen =

Belgian Resistance group during World War II

Legion of Campine Kempisch Legioen (KL)
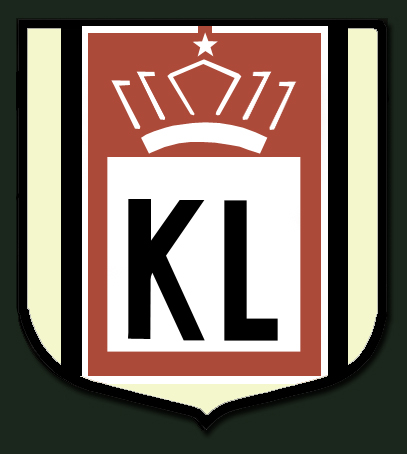
- Leader: Omer Bobon (founder)
- Active regions: Campine in Limburg
- Wars: the Second World War

The Legion of Campine (Dutch: Kempisch Legioen) or KL was a group of the Belgian resistance during the Second World War which operated in the Campine region in the provinces of Limburg and Antwerp by the Dutch border.
