= Petegem =

Petegem may refer to:

== Places ==
- Petegem-aan-de-Leie, a village in the Deinze municipality of Belgium
- Petegem-aan-de-Schelde, a village in the Wortegem-Petegem municipality of Belgium

== People ==
- Peter Van Petegem, road racing cyclist
