= Zonhoven =

- Municipality
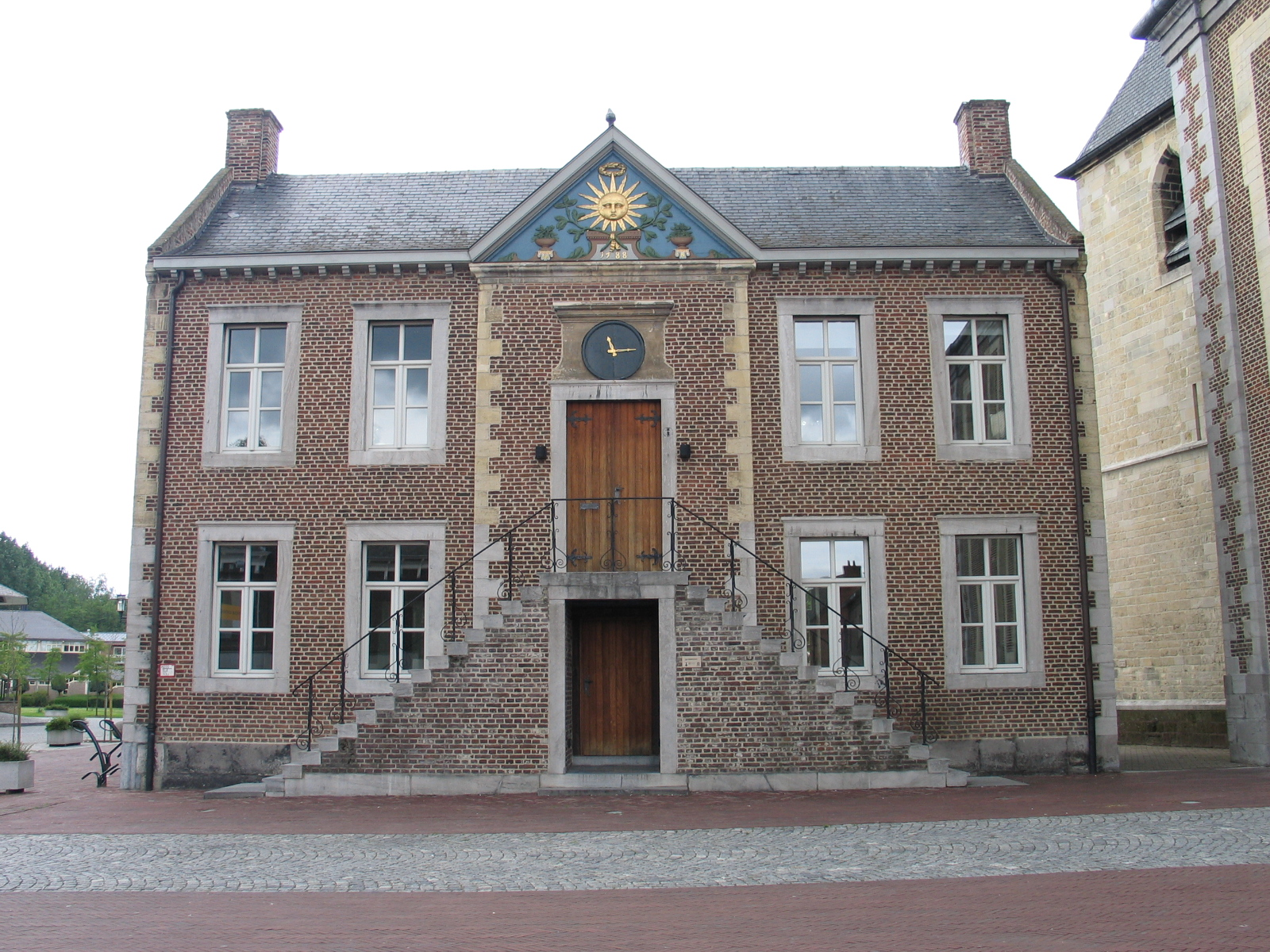
- Former town hall of Zonhoven

- Flag Coat of arms

- Location of Zonhoven in Limburg
- Interactive map of Zonhoven
- Location in Belgium
- Coordinates: 50°59′N 5°21′E
- Country: Belgium
- Community: Flemish Community
- Region: Flemish Region
- Province: Limburg
- Arrondissement: Hasselt

Government
  - Mayor: Bram De Raeve (Open Vld)
  - Governing party: Open Vld

Area
  - Total: 39.67 km^{2} (15.32 sq mi)

Population (2018-01-01)
  - Total: 21,214
  - Density: 534.8/km^{2} (1,385/sq mi)
- Postal codes: 3520
- NIS code: 71066
- Area codes: 011 - 089
- Website: www.zonhoven.be

Zonhoven (Dutch pronunciation: [ˈzɔnɦoːvə(n)]; Limburgish: Zoneve) is a municipality located in the middle of the Belgian province of Limburg located north of Hasselt and also borders Houthalen-Helechteren, Genk and Heusden-Zolder. It’s an urbanized municipality, in the edge area of Hasselt. The municipality belongs to the On January 1, 2019, Zonhoven had a total population of 21,237. The total area is 39.34 km^{2} which gives a population density of 506 inhabitants per km^{2}.

Archaeological findings from the period 11,000 BCE to 5,000 BCE, including the only fixed prehistoric polishing stone in Flanders, indicate early inhabitation of the territory. From the Middle Ages to the early modern period, Zonhoven and its neighboring villages belonged to the Land of Vogelsanck. Since the arrival of industry in the 19th and 20th centuries, the municipality has experienced a significant population increase: between 1930 and 1980, the population tripled. Iron ore mining, in particular, played a prominent role in the economy of Zonhoven.

The municipality includes the hamlets Halveweg, Termolen, and Terdonk.

== Toponymy ==
The place name 'Zonhoven' means 'water-rich, low-lying (marsh) land close to or along the watercourse the Son' The current name came about partly through folk etymology. At a certain point in history, language users were no longer aware of the original meaning of the old name Sonuwe. They then freely interpreted the name based on its word form (son- sounds like zon- and -uwe sounds somewhat like -hoven), resulting in Zonhoven. To understand the place name, one must listen to the local pronunciation /sōnəvə/ rather than looking at the written form Zonhoven.

The word element 'zon-' refers to the Son. This is an old name for the Zonderikbeek, a stream that flows through Zonhoven and partially shapes the landscape of the municipality, but which is known to Zonhoven residents as the Roosterbeek. Contrary to common belief, the first part of the place name Zonhoven does not refer to the sun as a star. As a result of this misunderstanding, several businesses, schools, and sports clubs have incorporated the prefixes 'zon-' or 'sun-' into their names and depicted the sun or a sundial in their logos. Examples include the primary school De Zonnewijzer, the beer Zonderik, café 't Zonnehof, and the baseball club Sunville Tigers. The sun is also incorporated into the coat of arms and flag of Zonhoven. The element '-hoven' traces back to '-ouwe', which means 'alluvial land'. It refers to the valley of the Zonderikbeek. In the past, it was suspected that '-hoven' referred to 'hof', meaning 'estate' or 'farm'. Consequently, 'the farm of the Zon family' was a possible explanation for the name Zonhoven, but this explanation has since been rejected

== History ==
Zonhoven is a municipality located in the province of Limburg, Belgium. Its history can be traced back to ancient times, with evidence of human activity in the area dating back to the Roman period. The region was likely inhabited by the Tungri, a Germanic tribe that settled in the area during Roman rule. During the Middle Ages, Zonhoven was part of the County of Loon, a feudal state within the Holy Roman Empire. The village gradually developed around a central church and became a predominantly agricultural community. In the 14th century, Zonhoven fell under the control of the Duchy of Brabant. The region experienced its share of historical events, including the turbulence of the Eighty Years' War (1568–1648), which had a significant impact on the Low Countries. Like many other Belgian towns, Zonhoven witnessed conflicts and changes in rulership during this period. On November 18, 1833, the Treaty of Zonhoven was signed in the house named De Franse Kroon between representatives of the Netherlands and Belgium to establish special regulations over the use of the river Meuse by the signatories. The 19th century brought industrialization to Zonhoven, transforming its predominantly agrarian economy. The village expanded, and its population grew as industries such as coal mining and textile production took root in the area. The advent of the railway in the late 19th century further facilitated economic development and connectivity.In the 20th century, Zonhoven, like many European towns, faced the challenges posed by both World Wars. The aftermath of these conflicts saw periods of reconstruction and economic recovery.

== Demography ==
As of January 1, 2019, Zonhoven had a population of 21,237 residents. This makes Zonhoven the thirteenth municipality in the province of Limburg and the 140th municipality in Belgium. The municipality has fewer inhabitants than its neighboring municipalities. Among the four hamlets comprising Zonhoven, the center has the highest population, followed by Termolen.

== Sport ==
The municipality has four amateur football clubs, all playing in provincial divisions: Flandria Termolen, FC Melosport Zonhoven, KFC Halveweg Zonhoven, and Zonhoven VV. The latter played three seasons in the Third Division in the 1970s. In addition to these four clubs affiliated with the KBVB, other amateur teams also play in Zonhoven, including Tuinwijk VV, Weerstand Zonhoven, and FC Wanhoop. Zonhoven is particularly known in the football world for its women's football teams. DV Zonhoven played at the national level for a long time in the Second Division until they merged with DV Lanaken in 2012 to form DVL Zonhoven.

In Zonhoven, various sports facilities can be found. The largest is the open-air sports center Basvelden, which houses football club Zonhoven VV, equestrian club Zonnehoef, Zonhoven Athletics Club, tennis club TC Basveld, and baseball and softball club Sunville Tigers. The latter club is active at the highest level in Belgium. Basvelden comprises seven football fields, eight tennis courts with a tennis hall, several beach volleyball courts, two baseball fields, a stable with a covered riding arena, a skate and BMX park, two basketball courts, an athletics track, a petanque court, and a 2,700-meter-long Finnish track. In Halveweg, there is also an open-air sports center with football and tennis fields available for sports clubs. The largest indoor sports facility in Zonhoven is the events hall Den Dijk in the village center. Volleyball clubs Topsport Davozon (women) and VC Helios (men) play their home games there. The latter team played in Liga B for a long time. In addition to this events hall, there are also a sports hall in Terdonk and a sports hall at Windekind primary school in the center. Gymnastics club Olympia is active in all sports halls in the municipality.

== Education ==
The municipality has six primary schools. Each of the four parishes is equipped with kindergarten and primary education: 'De Horizon' in Terdonk, 'De Lettermolen' in Termolen, 'De St@rtbaan' in Halveweg, and 'De Zonnewijzer' in the center. In addition, primary school 'Kosmos' and Freinet school 'De Toverfluit' represent community education with each having a kindergarten and primary school. They are also located in the center. Also located in the center of Zonhoven is the kindergarten 'De Kleurdoos.' In Zonhoven, secondary education is available at two schools: the Vrije Middenschool (first grade) and the Sint-Jan Berchmansinstituut (second and third grade). The schools work closely together as sister schools. They are located in the center within walking distance of each other and belong to the Scholengemeenschap Sint-Quintinus. Approximately 1,000 students are educated there.

== Notable persons born/raised in Zonhoven ==
- Lieve Baeten (1954–2001), author and illustrator of children's books
- Bieke Broux (1985), Multiple Sclerosis researcher/scientist
- Anke Buckinx (b. Maasmechelen, 1980), VJ and radio personality
- Koen Buyse (1977), frontman of Zornik
- Rik Ceulemans (b. Hasselt, 1972), athlete
- Patrick Claesen (b. Hasselt, 1965) aka Pat Krimson, ex-Leopold 3, frontman of 2 Fabiola, DJ and producer
- Luc Indestege, (1901–1974) writer
- Kikx, former boyband
- Ingrid Lieten (b. Hasselt 1964), Flemish minister
- Luc Nilis (1967), former soccer player
- Roel Paulissen (b. Hasselt 1976), mountain biking
- Marleen Renders (b. Diest 1968), marathon runner
- Charlotte Timmers (1988), actress
- Chris Thys (1954), actress, sister of Leah Thys
- Leah Thys (1945), actress, sister of Chris Thys
- Jos Vandeloo (1925–2015), writer
- Marilou Vanden Poel-Welkenhuysen (1941), former MOP, former mayor of Zonhoven
- Margot Vanderstraeten (b. Hasselt, 1967), writer
- Tim Vanhamel (1977), frontman of Millionaire and ex-Evil Superstars
- Francesca Vanthielen (b. Eeklo, 1972), actress, host
- Wout Wijsmans (b. Hasselt, 1977), volleyball player

== Products of Zonhoven ==
- Zonderik Belgian beer
- Konings (distillery)

== Gallery ==
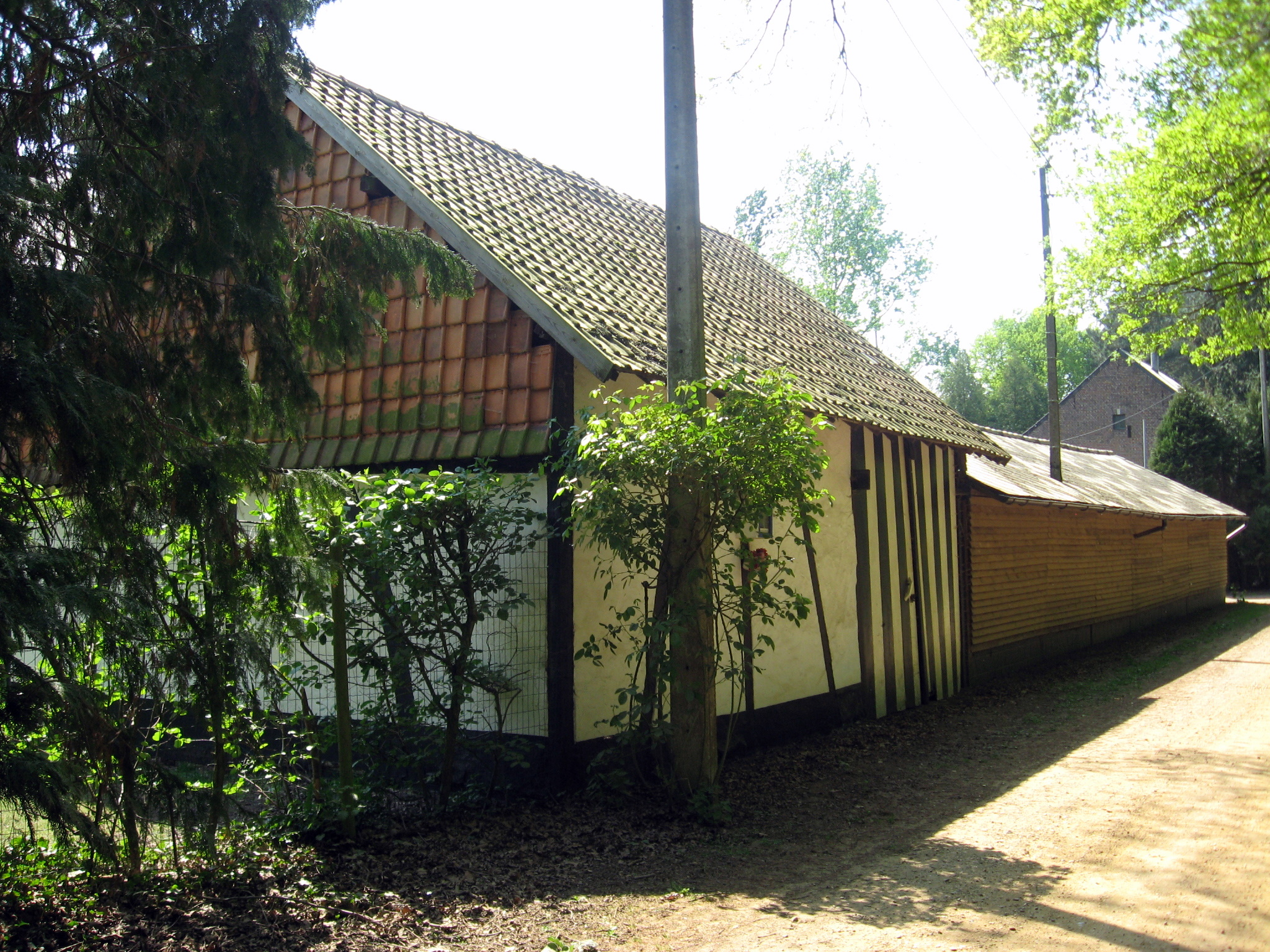
House of the forester

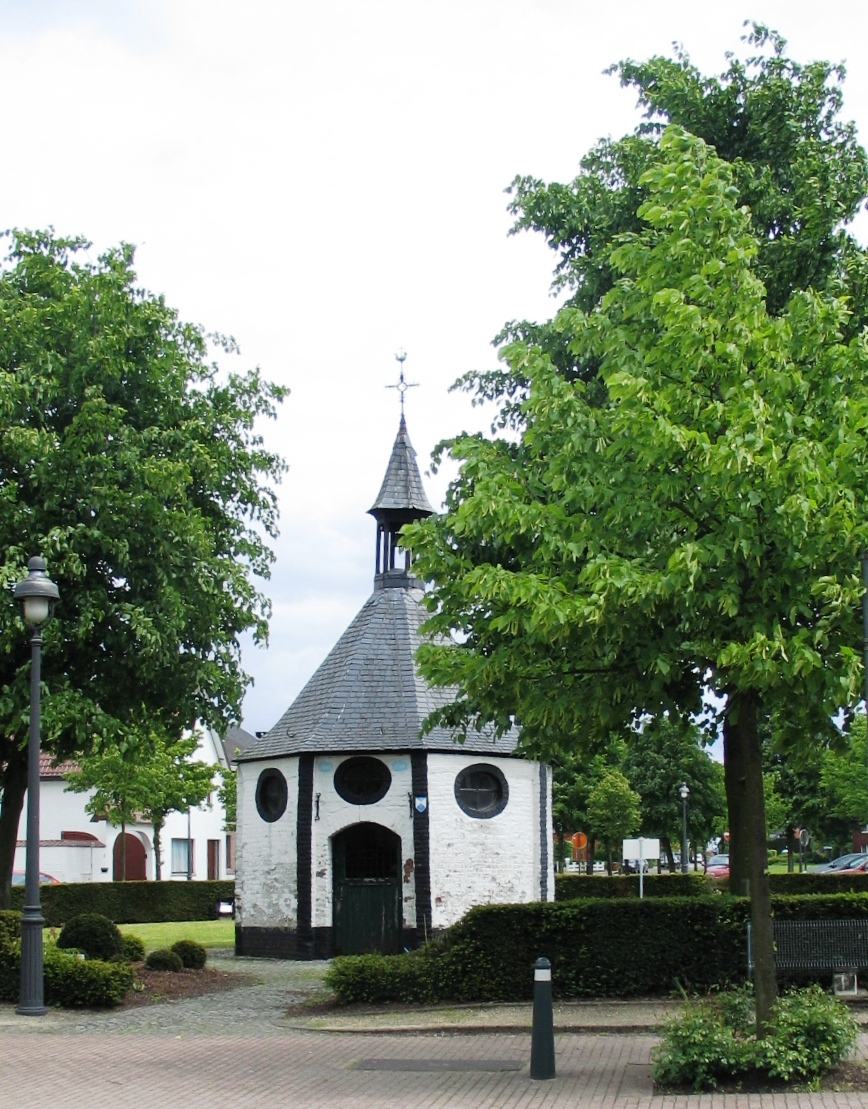
18th century chapel in Zonhoven

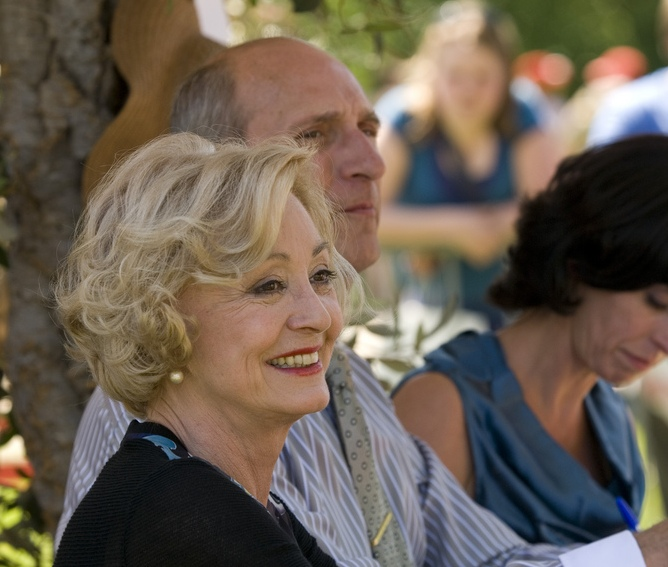
Leah Thys
