= Koningshooikt =

- Village
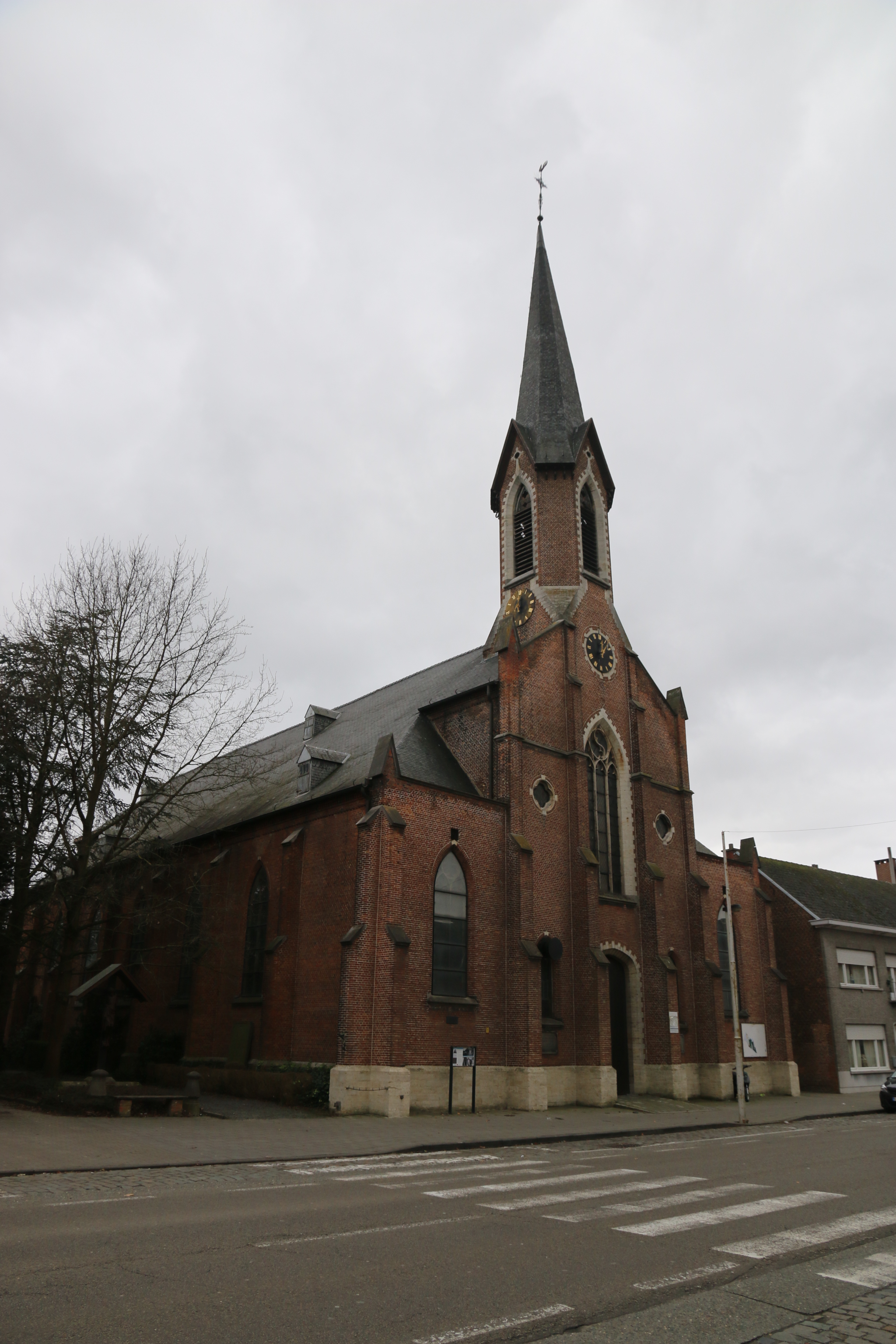
- St John the Evangelist Church

- Location in Belgium
- Coordinates: 51°06′N 4°36′E
- Country: Belgium
- Region: Flemish Region
- Province: Antwerp
- Municipality: Lier, Belgium

Area
  - Total: 16.63 km^{2} (6.42 sq mi)

Population (2021)
  - Total: 4,243
  - Density: 255.1/km^{2} (660.8/sq mi)
- Time zone: CET

Koningshooikt is a village that since 1977 forms a municipality with Lier in the Belgian province of Antwerp. In the local dialect Koningshooikt is often called Jut or Koningsjut. Koningshooikt was founded on 1 January 1822, when the village Koningsbossen (also known as Koningsbos or 's-Herenbos) were united with quarters Hooikt and Hazendonk, the latter separated from the village Berlaar.

The village is known because of the bus manufacturer Van Hool, the sound recording studio Motormusic Studios and the motorhome constructor Motorhomes Konings.

== Gallery ==
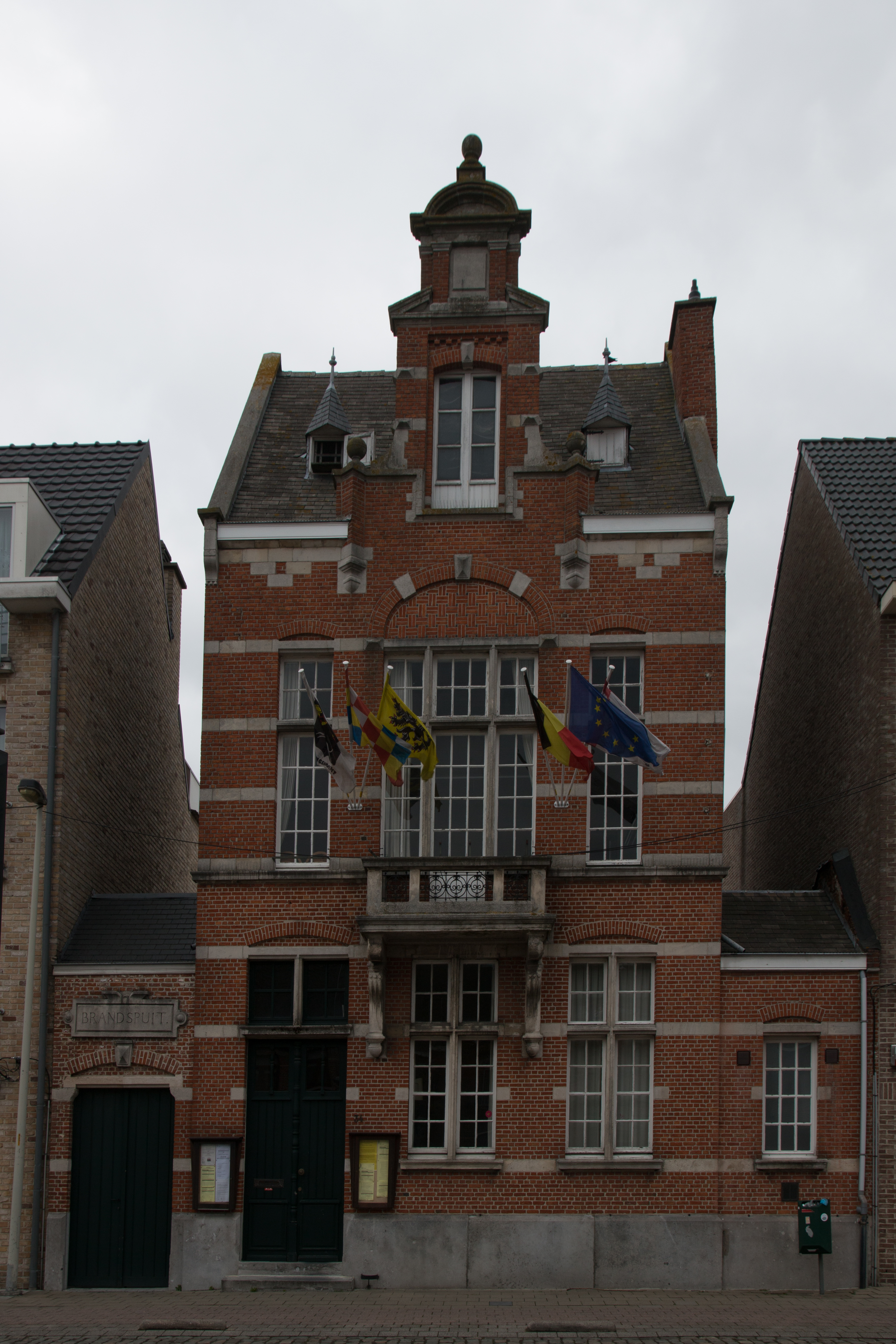
Former town hall

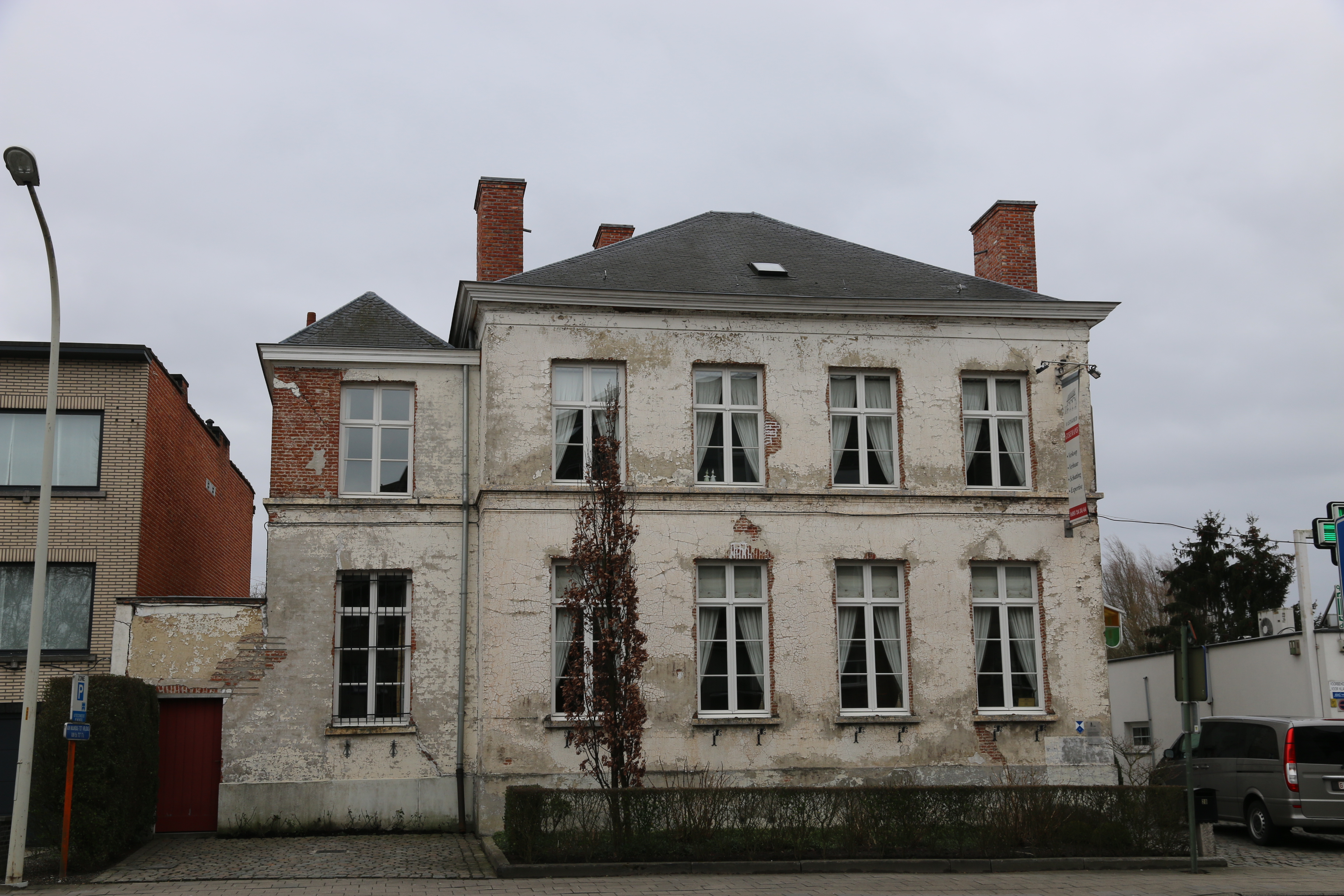
Clergy house

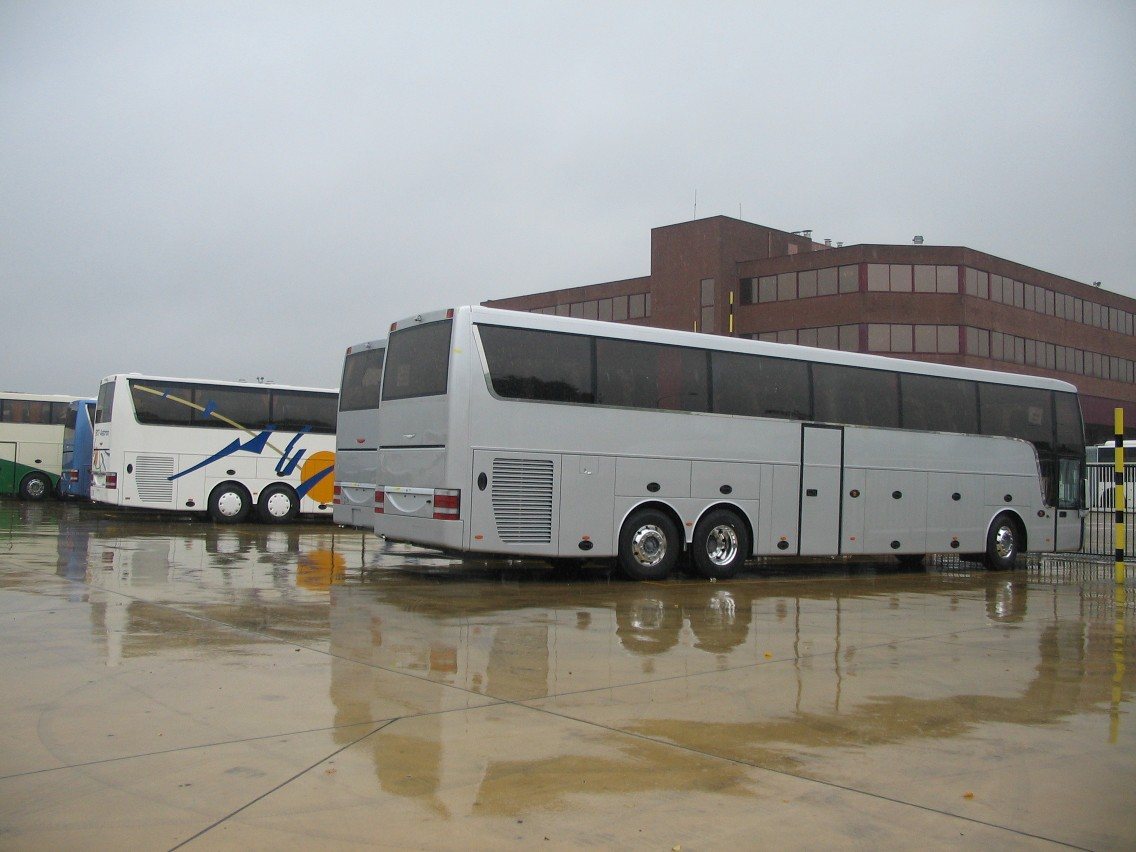
Buses

== See also ==
- K-W Line, a defense line between Koningshooikt and Wavre during World War II
