= Cananefates =

Roman-era Germanic people of South Holland

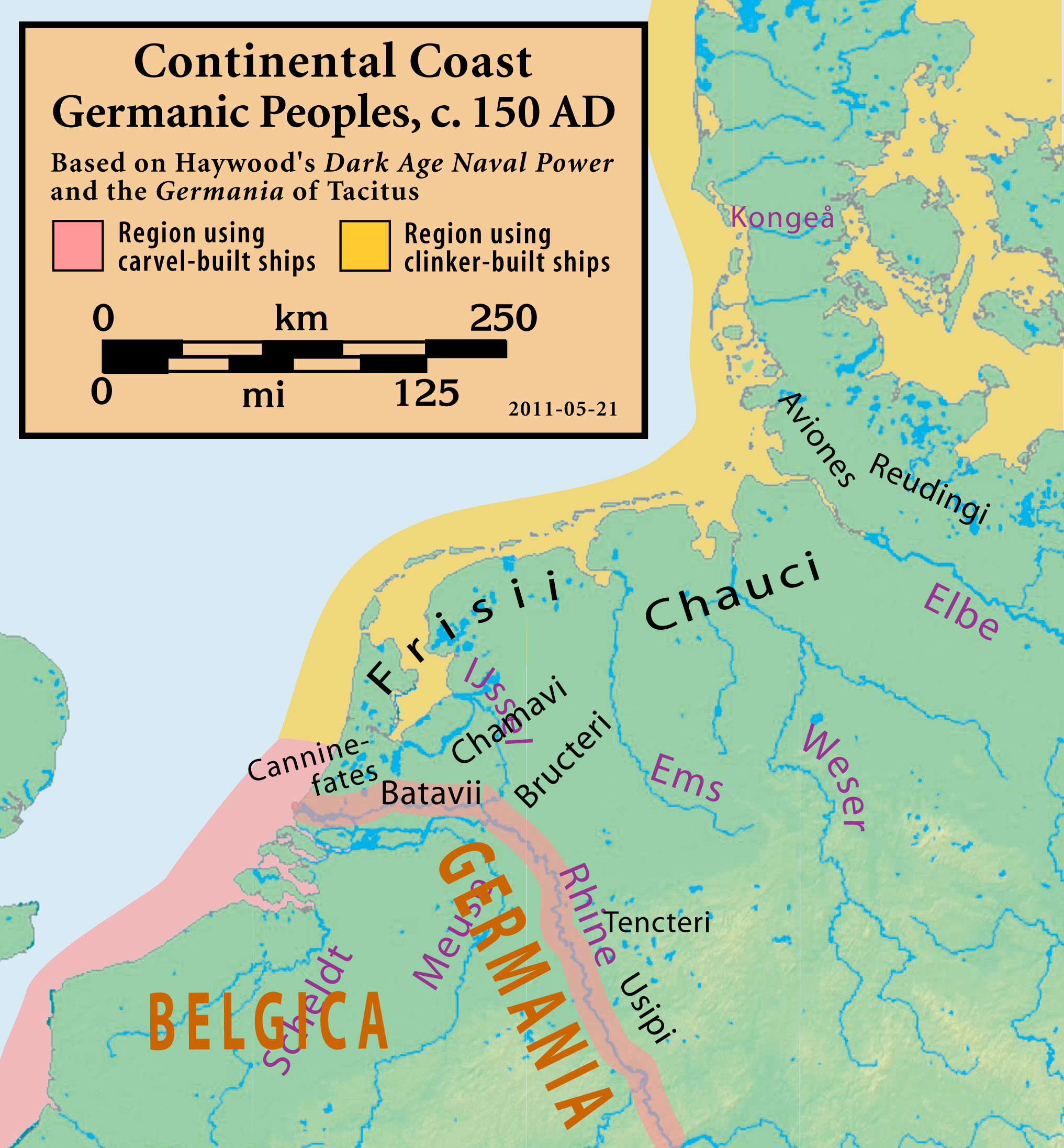

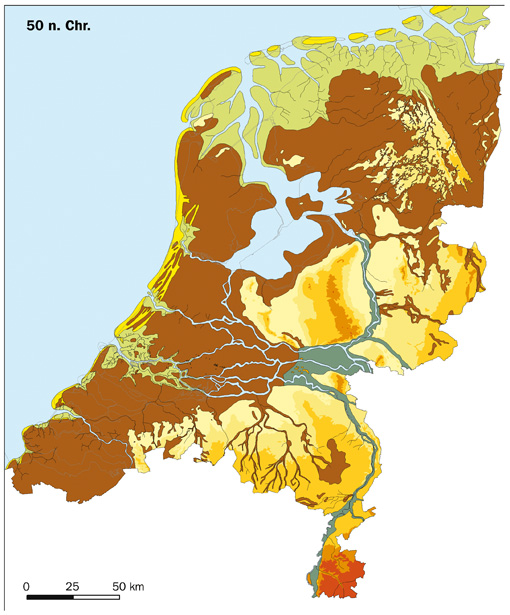
A reconstruction of the topography of the Netherlands in about 50 AD

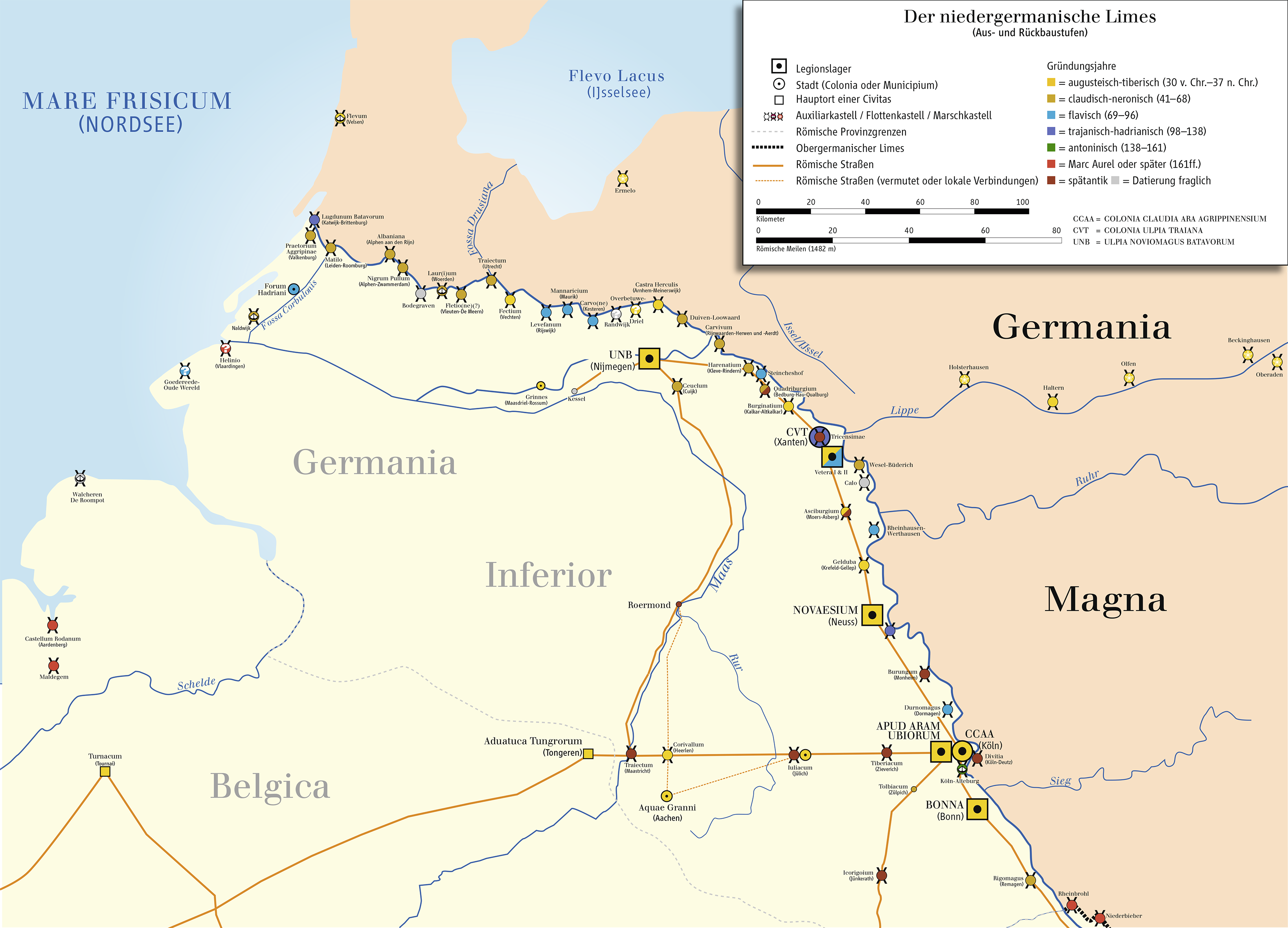
The Roman border along the Lower Rhine

The Cannenefates (spelled in many ways including Cananefates, Canninefates) were a Germanic people who lived in the western Rhine-Meuse delta, in the Roman province of Germania Inferior. In present-day terms they lived in what is now the Dutch province of South Holland), during the time of the Roman Empire.

They were the western neighbours of the Batavians, living on the western part of the same island, called Batavia, and therefore south the Oude Rijn (part of the old course of the Rhine, near the North Sea). According to the classical author Tacitus, they closely resembled the Batavians in their origins, language, and in their courageous character, but they were inferior in numbers. With some exceptions, scholars generally interpret this to mean that their military elite descended from the Chatti, which is how Tacitus explains the origins of the Batavians. North of the Cannenefates lived the Frisii, on the other side of the Rhine.

The Cannenefates contributed cavalry and elite soldiers to the Roman military.

== Name and language ==
The name was spelled in various ways. Different manuscripts of Tacitus have either Canninefates or Cannenefates in almost equal numbers, while Pliny the Elder spells the name Cannenefates. Inscriptions and military diplomas contain these and other forms, including Canonefas, Cannanefates, and shorter spellings such as Cannefates and Canafates.

There is no consensus about the etymology of the name. An old and still common proposal, supported for example by Günter Neumann, is that the name is Germanic and means "boat masters", with the first component being an old Germanic word for a type of vessel or boat. Another proposal still maintained in 21st-century scholarship is that the first part of the name means "garlic" or "leek", from a Celtic word *cannena.

Concerning the second part of the name, both proposals follow the name the 19th century scholar Johann Kaspar Zeuss originally proposed that it is a Germanic ending "-fates", related to Gothic faþs, apparently from a Proto-Germanic form *fadiz, “lord, ruler, person in charge”, and traced ultimately to Proto-Indo-European potis, “lord, master", which is also represented by Ancient Greek despotēs and Sanskrit páti. This explanation is still accepted by, for example, Neumann, Schrijver, and Toorians.

Ludwig Rübekeil also proposed a combined Celtic and Germanic origin but according to this account it would mean "skilled horsemen". Like Rudolf Much in the early twentieth century, Rübekeil proposed that the first element may come from the common Germanic verb *kannan, “to know, be able”, related to the English word "can". According to this proposal the original form would have been either *kannin- meaning "capable or skilled", or *kannana- meaning "experienced". In contrast to many other scholars, Rübekiel connected -efates with a Celtic term *epetes “horsemen”, related to Gaulish epos “horse”. This interpretation formed part of his wider proposal that the Canninefates were originally the mounted warrior elite of the Batavi rather than a separate tribe in the usual sense.

Other proposed explanations have connected the first element with words for low-lying ground or watercourses, with a non-Germanic “Northwest Block” substrate, or with the name of a settlement.

The modern name Kennemerland has sometimes been connected with the name of the Canninefates, although the derivation is not certain. The Canninefates are not known to have inhabited Kennemerland, which lies north of the Old Rhine.

== Location ==
Pliny the Elder, writing around 70 AD, mentioned the notable island which was shared by the Batavians and Canninefates (nobilissima batavorum insula et cannenefatium) among the various islands of the Rhine-Meuse delta, which also contained islands inhabited by Frisii, Chauci, Frisiavones, Sturii, and Marsacii. This island was between the main Rhine channel and the Waal river which splits off from the Rhine.

Tacitus, writing in about 100 AD described the island shared with the Batavi in the same way. He also indicates that for them, the quickest attack they could make on Romans was by sea, implying that they lived on the western side of the island, with the Ocean on their west.

In his descriptions of the Batavian Revolt Tacitus describes how, in 69 AD, after they committed to the revolt the Cananefates immediately called up the Frisii, who Tacitus pointed out lived across the Rhine.

In 70 AD still during the rebellion, Tacitus remarked that Claudius Labeo carried out raids in the territory of the Cananefates and Marsaci. This implies that the territory of these two peoples shared a border in the delta.

== Origins ==
Tacitus described the Cananefates as being the same as the Batavi in origin, language, and valour, but smaller in numbers. In another place, the same author explained that the Batavi, who he described as the most valorous of all the peoples (gentes) on the Rhine, had originally been a part of the Chatti. According to him, domestic strife (seditione domestica) forced the Batavi to move away from the other Chatti. He also emphasized that they had a privileged and old alliance (antiquae societatis) with Rome. It is however not clear exactly either when or how the Romans first came into contact with either the Batavi, or the Chatti, or when the Chatto-Batavian elite first settled in the Rhine delta.

Lanting and van der Plicht have argued based on archaeological evidence that when he referred to a similar origin, Tacitus did not necessarily mean that the Cananefates settlers were Chatti. One reason they question that idea is that the two regions show signs of re-population after Roman invasion beginning at quite different times, making it unlikely they the two settlements were the result of the same specific tribal uprising among the Chatti. Another argument against that idea, is that unlike the Batavi, the Cananefates show no sign of using coins similar to those of the Chatti. On the other hand they note that the population seems to have included people who shared the material culture of the neighbouring Frisii, living north of the Rhine, possibly as survivors of the older population. In the same way, the Batavi seem to have settled upon a pre-existing population who may have been Eburones.

== Classical history ==
There is a possible early mention of the Canninefates by Velleius Paterculus who described a Roman attack across the Rhine led by Tiberius in 4 AD. The surviving text is corrupted and says on his campaign he conquered the "cam ui faciat Tuari Bructeri" which modern scholars amended to "Caninefaci, Attuari, Bructeri". However, this is now doubted, and another proposal is that it originally listed "Chamavi, Chattuarii, Bructeri". In fact, based on the account of Tacitus that they had similar origins to the Batavians, the Cannenefates had probably settled in the area as allies of the Romans well before then.

The first clearly recorded incident was in 28 AD when the Roman military governor of the area Lucius Apronius called upon a Cannenefate cavalry unit to suppress a rebellion by the neighbouring Frisii, who lived north of the Rhine. According to Tacitus, Apronius "made the nearest tidal channels secure with causeways and bridges for the heavier column to cross; and meanwhile, once fords had been found, he ordered the Cananefate cavalry wing and such of the Germanic infantry as served among our forces to go around to the enemy’s rear". Tacitus believed that the Roman force was strong enough, but by sending in forces in waves the Roman forces were constantly in a disorderly state of recovering soldiers from the previous wave.

In 47 AD, Gannascus, who had been a Cananefate auxiliary soldier for Rome led a group of Chauci in small vessels to plunder the wealthy and unwarlike Gallic coasts of the Roman Empire. A new Roman governor Corbulo drove a trireme up the channel of the Rhine with the other vessels, entered the tidal streams and sank the enemy’s small boats, driving out Gannascus. He subsequently increased discipline among Romans forces based in the region, and put pressure on the Chauci and Frisii.

At the beginning of the Batavian rebellion under Gaius Julius Civilis in the year 69, the Batavians sent envoys to the Canninefates to join them. The Canninefates chose Brinno to lead them, and raised him up on their shields in a traditional manner. He came from a family with a rebellious reputation, the son of a chief who had scorned a ridiculous expedition of the emperor Caligula. He immediately called up the Frisii, who Tacitus pointed out lived across the Rhine.

The capital of the civitas of the Cananefates was possibly Forum Hadriani, modern Voorburg. Probably in the year 120 or 121, the emperor Hadrian granted market rights to an existing settlement and it came to be called Forum Hadriani. By 162 it was the chief town of the Civitas Cananefat(i)um, and was raised to the status of Municipium Aelium Cananefat(i)um, or Municipum Aurelium Cananefat(i)um.

After the third century, their name disappears from the historical record.

== Roman military units ==
The Canninefates appear in many Roman military records, like their neighbours the Batavians. These records continue into the second century. From at least the time of the revolt of 69–70 there was a Cohors I Cannanefatium. It was based in the fort of Tihau in present day Romania. It was within the military of the Roman province of Dacia Porolissensis.

There was also an elite cavalry unit (Ala) named after the Canninefates, both before and after the revolt, which was first stationed in Germania Superior and between 90 and 116 moved to Pannonia Superior. From the end of the second century to the beginning of the third century it was in North Africa.

== Sources ==
- Callies, Horst (1975), "Bataver § 1. Historisches", in Beck, Heinrich; Geuenich, Dieter; Steuer, Heiko (eds.), Reallexikon der Germanischen Altertumskunde, vol. 2 (2 ed.), De Gruyter, pp. 90–91, ISBN 978-3-11-006740-8
- Lanting; van der Plicht (2010). "De ^{14}C-chronologie van de Nederlandse Pre- en Protohistorie. VI: Romeinse tijd en Merovingische periode, deel A: historische bronnen en chronologische schema's". Palaeohistoria. 51–52. ISBN 978-90-77922-73-6.
- Stolte, Bernhard H. (1981), "Cananefaten", in Beck, Heinrich; Geuenich, Dieter; Steuer, Heiko (eds.), Reallexikon der Germanischen Altertumskunde, vol. 4 (2 ed.), De Gruyter, pp. 329–330, ISBN 978-3-11-006513-8
- Neumann, Günter (2000), "Kananefaten", in Beck, Heinrich; Geuenich, Dieter; Steuer, Heiko (eds.), Reallexikon der Germanischen Altertumskunde, vol. 16 (2 ed.), De Gruyter, pp. 217–219, ISBN 978-3-11-016782-5
- Schrijver, Peter (1994), De Etymologie van de Naam van de Cannenefaten. Amsterdamer Beiträge zur älteren Germanistik, vol. 41, pp. 13–22, doi:10.1163/18756719-04101004
- Toorians, Lauran (2006), "De Cananefaten in taalkundig perspectief", in W. de Jonge; J. Bazelmans; D.H. de Jager (eds.), Forum Hadriani. Van Romeinse stad tot monument
- Zimmer, Stefan (2005), "Þusundifaþs", in Beck, Heinrich; Geuenich, Dieter; Steuer, Heiko (eds.), Reallexikon der Germanischen Altertumskunde, vol. 30 (2 ed.), De Gruyter, ISBN 978-3-11-018385-6
