= Brinno =

1st century ruler of the Canninefates, a Germanic tribe

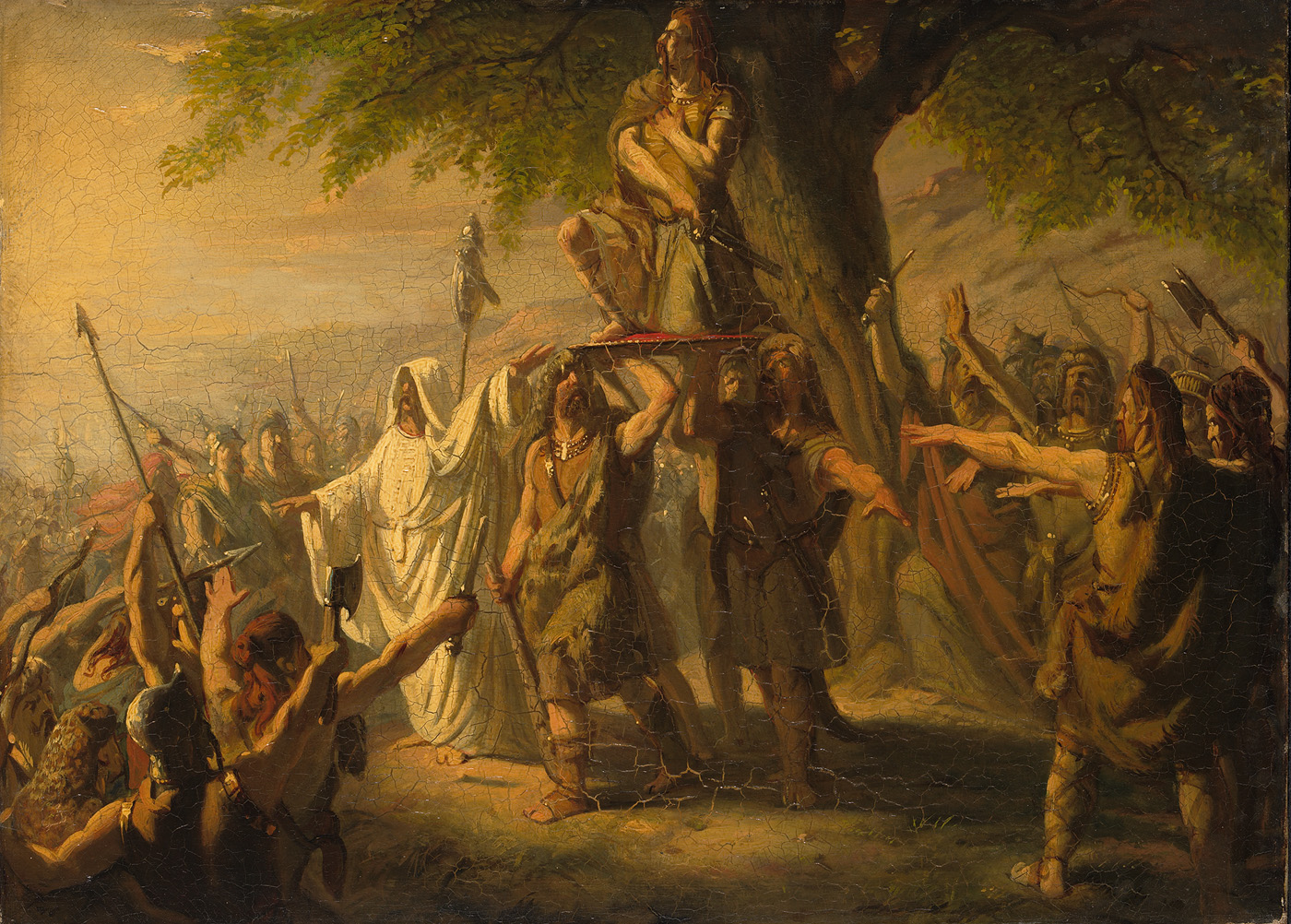
Brinno as leader of the Canninefates, raised on the shield by Barend Wijnveld (Anno 70).

Brinno was leader of the Canninefates when they joined in the Batavian rebellion at the mouth of the Rhine in AD 70. According to Tacitus, his father had been hostile towards the Romans during the reign of Caligula. Therefore, Brinno was chosen to lead the Canninefates against Rome, and was ceremoniously raised on a shield. His first move as commander was to attack Roman winter camps by sea with the help of the Frisii, in which he was successful due to the unprepared enemy. One of the camps destroyed has been identified at Praetorium Agrippinae. Brinno then threatened to advance on the Roman forts in the region, leading the Romans to burn these forts down with the fear of being unable to defend them, one such fort being located at Traiectum.
