= Frisii =

Roman era inhabitants of northern Netherlands

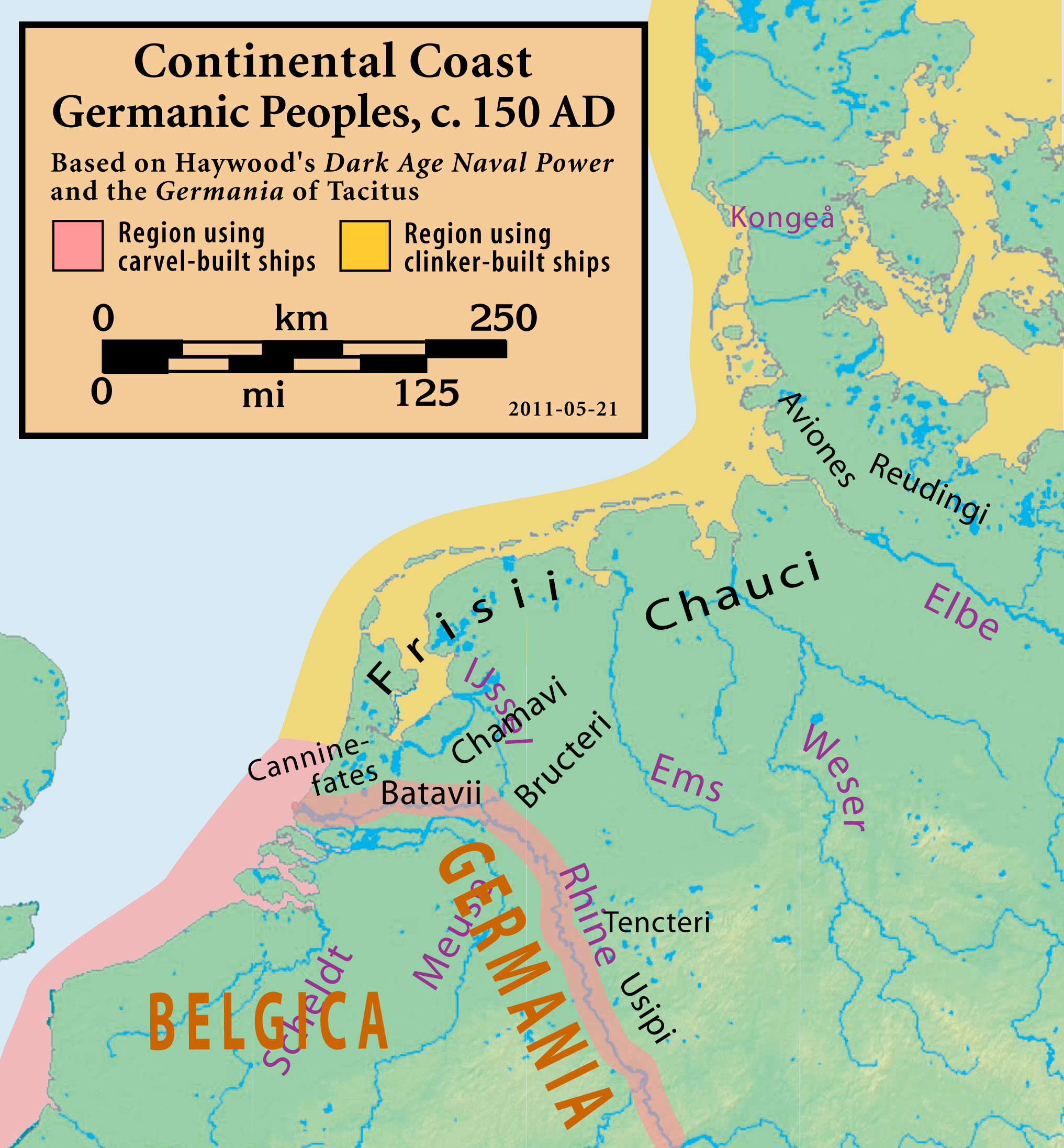
- Map of the modern coastline of the Netherlands, Germany, and Denmark, showing the Germanic peoples that lived there c. 150 AD and shipbuilding techniques they used.

Regions with significant populations
- Frisia

Religion
- Germanic paganism

Related ethnic groups
- Saxons, Angles, Chauci, Frisiavones, Frisians

The Frisii were the inhabitants of what are now the coastal regions north of the Rhine delta during the Roman Empire, corresponding to what is now the coastal Netherlands north of the Rhine and approximately the provinces of North Holland, Friesland and Groningen. They are known from Roman records between about 12 BC and 297 AD, and after this the name of the Frisii disappeared from records for approximately 300 years. The details of the connection between them and the later medieval Frisians is uncertain because there is a long gap in the records, and evidence of a major decrease and change in the population during that period.

During the 1st century BC, Romans took control of the Rhine delta and made a treaty with the Frisii to the north of the river which required them to supply cattle hides, but they managed to maintain some level of independence and they fought in several major revolts against the Romans in the first century AD. Frisii were enlisted in the Roman military, and the elite German bodyguard of the emperors.

During the Crisis of the Third Century, the Roman Empire lost control of the Rhine delta and peoples from north of the Rhine including Frisii and Chamavi settled south of the Rhine. The military Tetrarchy emperors pacified the region by moving large parts of the population, settling them in other parts of Gaul as servile laeti or soldiers in the Roman military. The Latin Panegyrics report them being used as farm labourers in Gaul. At this time it appears that at least some Frisii were, like neighbouring peoples, categorized by Romans as Franks, and administratively the people removed from Batavia itself at this time were apparently placed into military units and laeti prefectures named after the Batavi, who had originally lived in that district.

After the third century, written records ceased to mention the Frisii for several centuries during the so-called Migration Period. The new terms Frank and Saxon were used to refer to the peoples who raided from north of the Rhine. These two terms covered several peoples and were apparently not mutually exclusive at first. Archaeological records show that in the coastal region where the Frisii had lived there was significant population decline and social disruption, possibly connected to frequent flooding caused by sea level rise. Apart from Frisii who became Franks, or Roman soldiers or settlers, it is probable that many Frisii were among the early "Saxons" who settled in Britain. A smaller population also continued to exist in the original Frisii lands.

The population of Frisia began to increase again in the 5th century and this involved a cultural influence, and probably settlers, from the coastal regions to the east, now in Northwestern Germany or Southwestern Denmark. Some scholars refer to the culture which influenced these new Frisians as an "Anglo Saxon" culture, because the Anglo Saxons who settled in Britain in this period are also believed to have come from the Frisian, German and Danish coasts and were influenced by the culture there. By the 7th century, these continental coastal dwellers people were being referred to with a name derived from the old name of the Frisii—the Frisians. This new Frisian culture subsequently stretched along a longer coastal fringe than the original Frisii, roughly from Bruges to Bremen, and it included many of small the offshore islands.

== Name and language ==
Over many generations of scholarship, there have been numerous proposals about the meaning of the name of the Frisii, but no consensus has been reached.

Many proposals assume that the Frisii spoke a Germanic language like the medieval Frisians, but there is no longer a consensus about this. In more recent modern scholarship, the language of the original Roman-era Frisii continues to be a topic of scholarly debate and uncertainty. The similar name of the Frisiavones, who also lived near the Rhine delta, is likely to derive from a Celtic language and the Frisiavones are believed to have been culturally Celtic, or strongly influenced by Celtic culture and language, as were their neighbouring tribes. Some scholars have also suggested that before the Romans the entire area was originally neither Germanic nor Celtic, but rather a zone where another language related to both was spoken.

The first century writer Pliny the Elder did not include the Frisii among the Germani, although he did include their neighbours the Chauci.

The names of the Frisian leaders Verritus and Malorix have been interpreted as Celtic compounds meaning respectively “strong runner” and “praise-king".

== Archaeological evidence (Roman and pre-Roman) ==
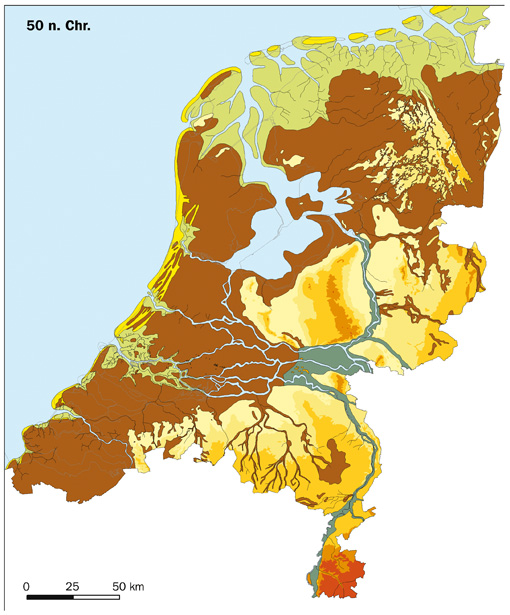
A reconstruction of the topography of the Netherlands in about 50 AD

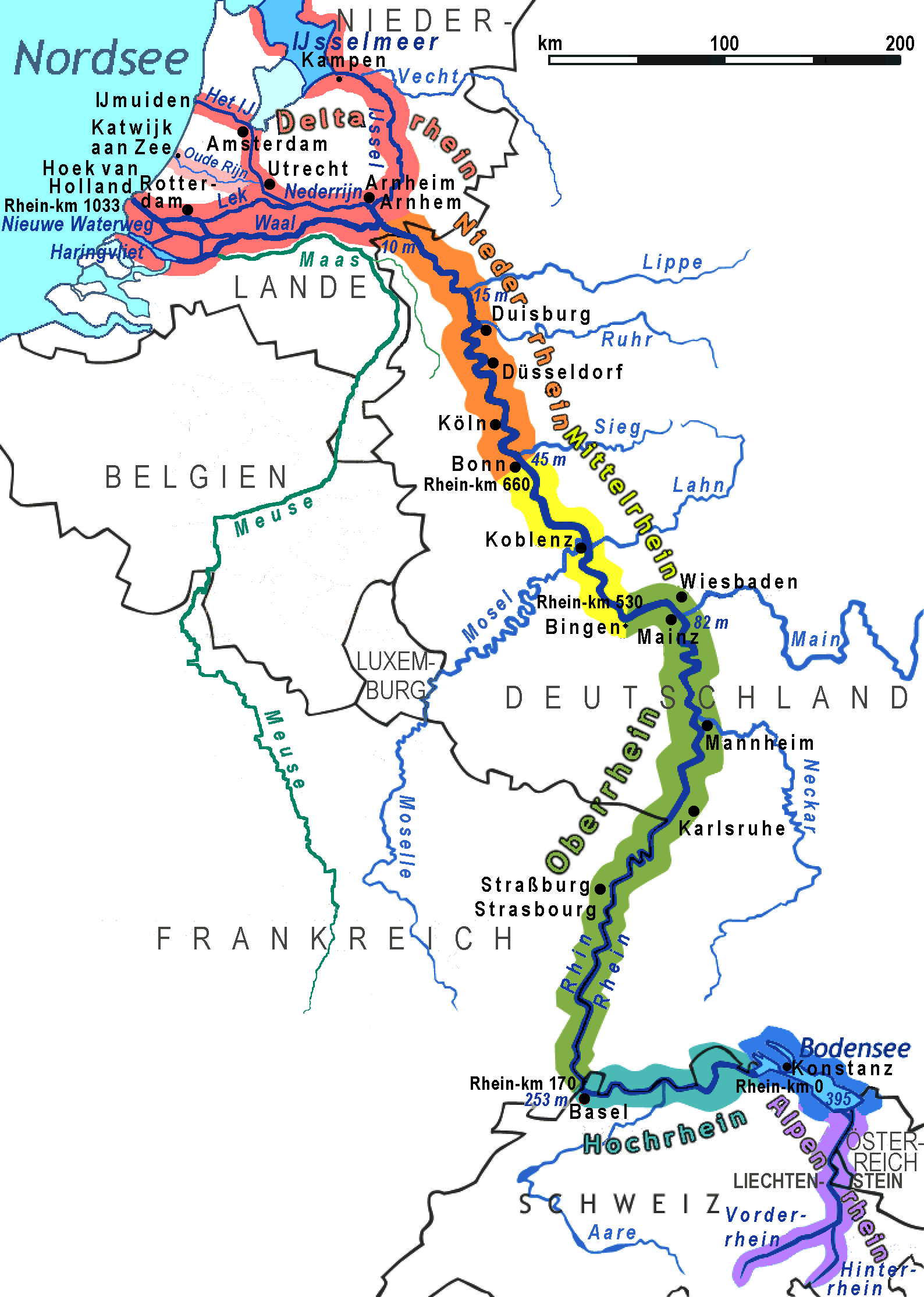
Rhine–Meuse–Scheldt delta Lower Rhine Middle Rhine Upper Rhine High Rhine Lake Constance (Untersee, Seerhein, Obersee) Alpine Rhine, Vorderrhein, Hinterrhein Rhine sources

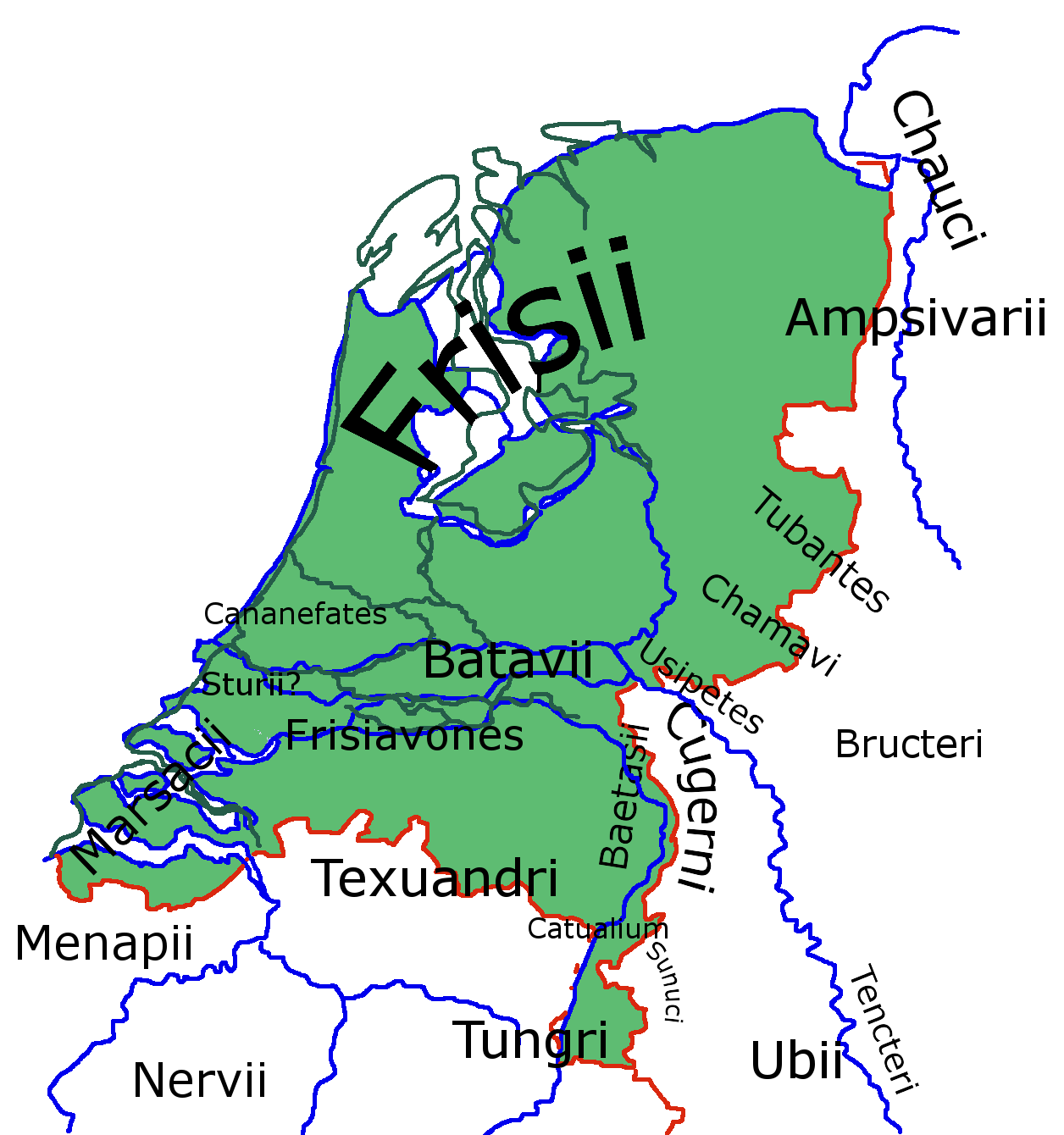
Tribes during Roman empire

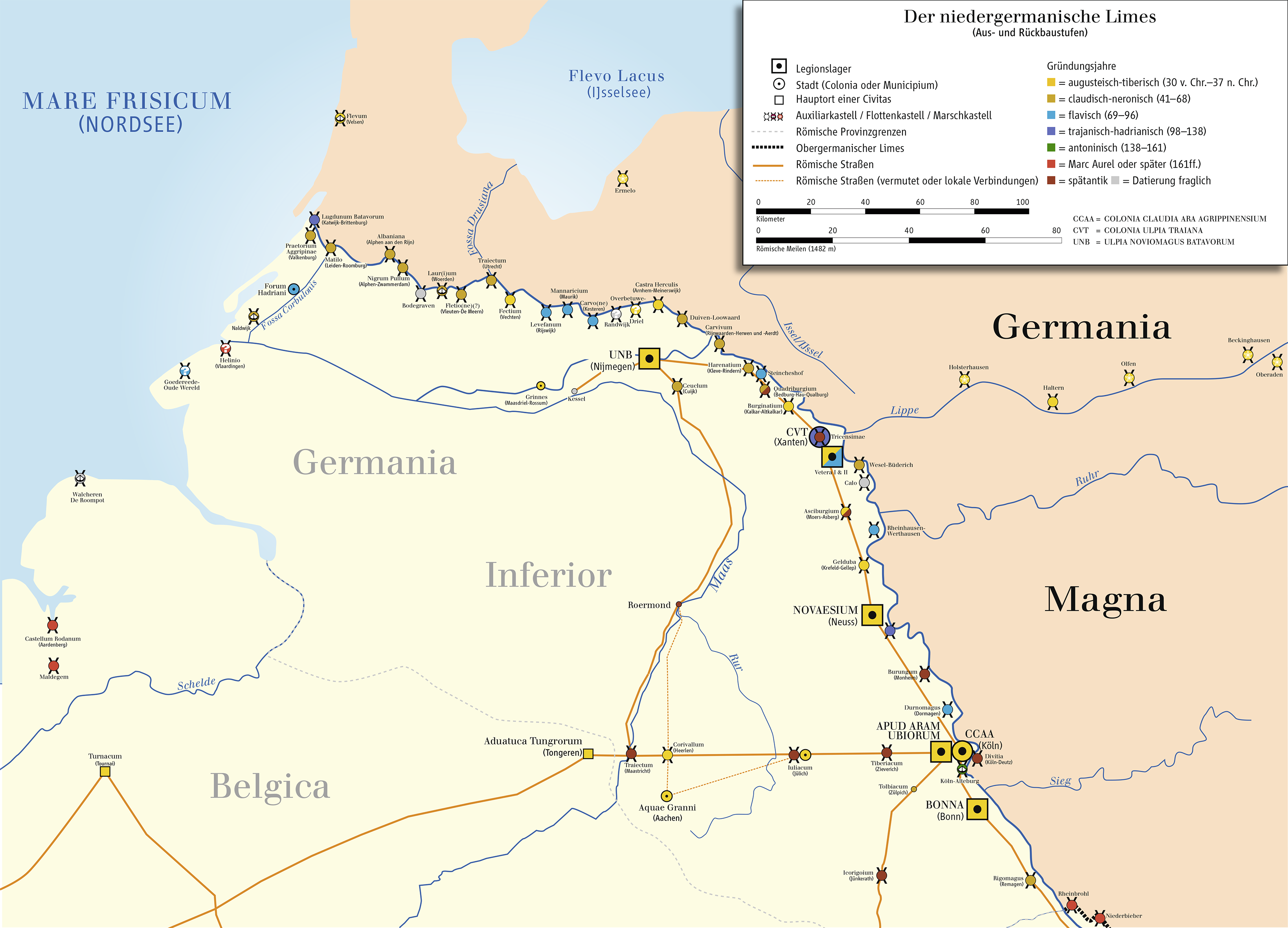
The Roman border along the Lower Rhine

Before and during the early Roman period, the northern Netherlands belonged to a wider North Sea coastal plain and salt-marsh zone, extending toward north-western Germany. In this landscape, habitation was often adapted to flooding through artificial dwelling mounds, known in Dutch as terpen or wierden.

Before the Romans there are no written records but pottery from the Frisii regions was related the pottery of the people who lived to their east along what is now the German coast, which in Roman times was the territory of the Chauci. Around the beginning of the Common Era, Taayke identifies a handmade pottery tradition which he calls "Frisian" as dominant in the coastal area. This pottery was characterized by a tripartite profile and by the so-called streepband ornament, used between about 200 BC and AD 50. The distribution of this late Iron Age and early Roman "Frisian" pottery was not limited to modern Friesland. Taayke maps and describes finds from Utrecht and the Batavian region in the delta, to North Holland, to Friesland, and to Groningen, and then further east into the German coastal plain. This means this pottery style stretched beyond the regions associated with Frisii by Roman era authors. Scholars note that these archaeological labels should not be read as direct ethnic labels. Galestin stresses that the term "Frisian pottery" does not prove that its makers identified themselves as Frisii, or that all people whom Roman authors called Frisii made this pottery.

Clearer regional differentiation followed in the first century AD, and a stronger east–west contrast existed in the second and third centuries. During the Roman era, pottery studies suggest both continuing connections and regional differentiations between the areas associated with the Frisii and their eastern neighbours, the Chauci. Near the end of the first century BC, pottery styles in Friesland, Groningen and North Holland were related. However, from the early first century AD, handmade pottery in Groningen diverged from the Frisian tradition and showed closer affinities with pottery from the northern German coastal plain. Taayke labels the first-century Groningen and north-west German material as "Chaucian pottery", and connects it with the coastal plain between the Ems and Elbe, the area associated in Roman sources with the Chauci. Taayke does not present this as a violent replacement, noting that at Paddepoel, near Groningen, the older Frisian style and the newer Chaucian-style pottery coexisted for a time, while settlement numbers increased in newly habitable parts of the salt marshes.

In the second and third centuries, Taayke places the main pottery contrast around the Lauwers, a river and former inlet between modern Friesland and Groningen. West of the Lauwers he describes a Frisian pottery territory extending south to the Oude Rijn (the old main course of the Rhine) near Leiden. East of the Lauwers he uses the term "North Sea coastal pottery" for the pottery of Groningen, Drenthe and the adjacent German coastal area, noting that the older "Chauci" label is less useful after the first century.

== Location ==
Pomponius Mela, writing in about 43 AD, described one region of the Frisii without mentioning them. He explained how the northern channel of the Rhine within the delta is at first narrow and unchanged, then it spreads out and covers a vast expanse, and where it floods the fields it becomes no longer a river but a huge lake called Lake Flevo. This lake contains islands of the same name. Eventually the Rhine becomes narrower again, and enters the sea as a river.

Writing in about 70 AD, Pliny the Elder wrote the earliest contemporary description specifically mentioning the Frisii. He numbered them among the peoples living on the islands of the Rhine-Meuse delta, which he defined in a broad way to include lands north of the Roman line of forts along the Old Rhine (Oude Rijn) which had its outlet at modern Katwijk. His definition included areas as far north as Flevum (modern Velsen) where the waters of Lake Flevo also discharged into the North Sea via the Oer-IJ, which was in the same place as the modern North Sea Canal between Velsen and Amsterdam. At Flevum the Romans also maintained a fort in Frisian territory.

Pliny said that within the delta, apart from "the most notable island the Batavi and Cananefates, which is almost a hundred miles in length" there were also islands inhabited by Frisii, Chauci, Frisiavones, Sturii and Marsacii. He therefore clearly distinguished the Frisii and the similarly named Frisiavones (or "Frisiabones"), who lived in different locations. Concerning the Frisiavones, Pliny also lists them in another region, among peoples living south of the Rhine delta, between the Sunuci and Betasii.

In another discussion about trees, Pliny said that in the land of the Chauci, near the two lakes there, oaks grew up to the edge of the waterline and sometimes became a hazard to Roman boats there.

Writing in about 100 AD, Tacitus described the Frisii of his time as living by the sea, and he distinguished greater and lesser Frisians according to their military strength, saying that both tribes are bordered by the Rhine as far as the Ocean and also live around enormous lakes. He does not define the locations of these two parts of the Frisii. Their neighbours further along the coast were the Chauci, who Tacitus believed held a very large coastal country.

In his accounts of historical events Tacitus indicates that the Frisii lived across the Rhine from the Cananefates, who were under Roman command, but were able to call upon the Frisii as allies. He also mentioned, in the context the hides which the Frisii supplied to Rome as a tax, that the forests of such Germani abound in huge cattle, while their domestic cattle are undersized. And in the context of events in 58 AD, he explains how the Frisii, aiming to settle a part of the Rhine bank, sent non-fighting Frisii by boat over the lakes, while the youth went through the swamps and forests.

The much later geography of Ptolemy, written in about 170 AD, is the only source which says that the boundary between the Frisii and Chauci in his time was the Ems river. This is however not easy to reconcile with Pliny's listing of the Chauci as one of the peoples inhabiting islands in the Rhine delta.

== Classical historians ==
Roman and Greek authors are the earliest surviving sources for the name of the Frisii. However, unlike some other peoples of the region, they were not mentioned by Julius Caesar in his account of his campaigns in Gaul in 58–52 BC.

In 12 BC, Cassius Dio (writing some centuries later) reported the first known Roman contact with the Frisii after Drusus the Elder attacked the Sugambri, and then sailed out of the Rhine, won the Frisii as allies and then sailed further to invade the territory of the Chauci, his ships were stranded on the ebb tide, and needed to be rescued by the Frisii. According to Tacitus, also writing later, Drusus already came to a taxation agreement with them, "suitable to their limited resources, the furnishing of ox hides for military purposes".

In 13-16 AD, Pliny the Elder (writing a generation or two later) mentioned that the Frisii had been allies of the Romans in the time when Germanicus Caesar was campaigning on the Rhine. During the campaign of Germanicus in the year 15, his forces marched through the land of the Frisii on their way to a rendezvous point with cavalry and ships on the river Ems.

The Frisii, like other Roman allies on the Rhine, contributed to the Germanic bodyguard of the Julio-Claudian emperors. There are two relevant inscriptions of members of the Germanic bodyguard of the emperor Nero (died 21 AD) in Rome, and the monuments were made before 37 AD. According to Seebold, one of them is identified one of the Frisii (natione Frisius), and the other, with a different spelling, shows that he is of the Frisiavones (natione Frisiaeo), who were a distinct people.

In 28 AD, the year that Julia the Younger died, Tacitus reported a revolt of the Frisians against the increased tax demands of their Roman governor Olennius. He took refuge in a fort named Flevum where a significant force of Romans and allies "kept guard over the shores of the ocean". Lucius Apronius, a regional military commander called in reinforcements and relieved the siege. There was a fierce battle involving large Roman forces, but the Romans could not bury their dead or take any revenge. On the following day more than a thousand more Roman soldiers were killed in conflicts at the villa of an ex-Roman (and possibly Frisian) named Cruptogorix, and at a forest called Baduhenna. The emperor Tiberius kept this Roman defeat quiet, but according to Tacitus the name of the Frisians became well known among the Germani.

In the year 47 AD the Frisians and their neighbours who had remained rebellious since their victory, came under pressure the new Roman governor Corbulo, after he brought strict discipline to the Roman forces and defeated a pirate named Gannascus, who was a Cannenefate from the Roman part of the delta, who had been a Roman soldier, but was now supported by the Chauci outside the empire. Corbulo built a fort among the Frisii, they were settled in lands marked out by him, and he gave them a Roman style senate, magistrates, and a constitution. According to Tacitus his approach was seen as dangerous, because he was irritating the Chauci and sowing the seeds of another revolt. The emperor Claudius (ruled 41–54), withdrew Roman forces to the south of the Rhine, meaning that any Frisians on the northern side probably became free again.

In the year 58, Tacitus reported that the Frisii felt the Roman commanders were still being held back from attacks, and under the leadership of Malorix and Verritus who were both kings "as far as Germani are under kings", "the Frisii moved up their youth to the forests and swamps, and their non-fighting population, over the lakes, to the river-bank. They then occupied lands on the bank of the Rhine which had been reserved for Roman soldiers. The two kings subsequently travelled to Rome, during the reign of Nero (ruled 54-68), but the visit was unsuccessful, and the Frisii who had built settlements were attacked by cavalry and forced to move.

In 69, Tacitus also reports that the Frisii played a role during the Batavian revolt. The Cannenefate leader Brinno joined the rebellion and then summoned the Frisii, "a people beyond the Rhine”. After the rebel leader Civilis overwhelmed the Roman battle-line with the Cannenefates, Frisians, and Batavi, his rival Claudius Labeo was sent off into the land of the Frisians. A major blow against Civilis was struck by the inhabitants of Cologne (Agrippinenses), who killed the most warlike of his cohorts, which consisted of Chauci and Frisii, who had been which was posted at Tolbiacum (Zülpich), on the frontiers of the Agrippinenses. They entertained them and made them drunk with wine, fastened the doors, and then set them on fire.

About AD 98, Tacitus writing very soon afterwards, reported that a band of Usipetes who had been serving in the Roman military in Britain escaped with three ships and after failing as sea-raiders in Britain, and resorting to cannibalism, lost their way and were intercepted first by Suevi, and then by Frisii. Some survived as slaves and lived to tell the tale.

== Frisii in the Roman military ==
The Frisii are attested in Roman military contexts from the early imperial period, although several inscriptions are difficult to distinguish from evidence for the similarly named Frisiavones who also served in the Roman military. Two early funerary inscriptions from Rome record members of the Germanic bodyguard of Nero Caesar: Bassus, described as natione Frisius, and Hilarus, described as natione Frisiaeo. Seebold interpreted these as one Frisian and one Frisiavone, while Galestin argues that the second form is too short to restore securely as Frisiavone and probably also refers to a Frisian. A further inscription from Cirencester names Sextus Valerius Genialis, a cavalryman of the Thracian ala (elite cavalry unit), as civis Frisiavus. This has also sometimes been seen as record of the Frisiavones, but Galestin treats the inscription as referring to a Frisian.

In the second century, the clearest evidence for Frisii concerns individuals rather than a named Frisian auxiliary cohort. A Roman military diploma from Pappenheim, dated to 129–134 AD, records a veteran described as Frisio, who had served in the Ala I Hispanorum Auriana and had a Batavian wife. A Vindolanda tablet from about 92–97 AD may also mention a soldier named or identified as Frissiaus, possibly in the Ninth Cohort of Batavians. By contrast, the similarly named Frisiavones are attested in the same period as an organized ethnic unit, the Cohors I Frisiavonum, which served in Britain and is known from military diplomas and building inscriptions.

In the third century, inscriptions from Britain attest Frisian units called cunei Frisiorum or cunei Frisionum, associated with forts near Hadrian's Wall, including Vercovicium (Housesteads), Aballava (Burgh-by-Sands) and Vinovia (Binchester). The Housesteads altar RIB 1594 names cives Tuihanti cunei Frisiorum Vercovicianorum, "Tuihanti tribesmen of the Frisian unit of Vercovicium", while other fragmentary inscriptions refer to Frisian units of Aballava and Vinovia. Seebold likewise treats the Housesteads inscriptions as strong evidence for a cuneus Frisiorum, while noting that some other fragmentary British inscriptions are uncertain. Handmade pottery first called "Housesteads ware" has also been identified as Frisian in tradition and appears to have been made locally in Britain, perhaps by Frisian soldiers or their relatives.

The late Roman Notitia Dignitatum lists a tribunus cohortis primae Frixagorum at Vindobala (Rudchester). This name has sometimes been connected with the Frisii, but Seebold and Galestin treat it more probably as referring to the Frisiavones, perhaps as a corrupt or altered form of Frisiavonum.

== Third and fourth centuries ==
In the crisis of the third century Rome lost control of the Rhine river delta, and they never fully regained it. Archaeological evidence confirms that from around 250, there was a massive decrease in population in many northern parts of Germania Inferior including Roman cities. Several regions around the Rhine-Meuse delta remained relatively unpopulated until around 400. Roymans and Heeren proposed that one possible explanation for this sudden depopulation is that the Roman emperors deported very large numbers of rebellious locals out of the region when they managed to pacify it in the late third century. Productive agricultural land was abandoned on a large scale, making the Roman military along the Rhine highly dependent on grain imports from other provinces. Although the Rhine forts did not cease to function completely, the districts around the delta were "dispensed with once and for all as tax-paying administrative units". A new name started to be used for the tribes who lived near the Rhine, and often raiding Roman settlements: the Franks.

During the tetrarchy period, the emperors fought many battles in the Rhine region and recovered some level of control. In 293/294, Constantius Chlorus (later emperor 305–306) defeated Franks south of the Rhine delta, fighting under his father-in-law Maximian (emperor 286–305). Various groups had crossed the Rhine and settled within the empire, possibly already in the time of Postumus (rebel western emperor, about 260–269), who may himself have been born in Batavia. They had been living outside of Roman governance during the rebellion of Carausius. The "6th" Latin Panegyric written in 310 says that Constantius "killed, expelled, captured [and] kidnapped" the Franks who had been settled in Batavia in the Rhine delta under the leadership of someone born there (for example Postumus, or Proculus, or Carausius). It uses the term nationes Franciae (Frankish nations) for the first time, indicating that the Franks were seen as more than one tribe or nation. The "8th" Latin Panegyric written in 297 says that after a campaign around the marshy mouth of the Scheldt, south the Rhine, the conquered were sent to help in the provinces. The author is thankful that as a result "it is for me that the Chamavian and the Frisian (Chamauus et Frisius) now plows". This makes it likely (but not certain) that both the Chamavi and the Frisii were considered Franks in this period. The same panegyric also emphasizes that there were Franks among the barbarian mercenaries of Carausius based in and around London, and the locals there had even begun to dress like them. Seebold argued that the term "cuneus" used to describe the mercenary unit which Carausius had in Britain implies that they were Frisii, or neighbouring peoples such as Tubantes who had served in Frisii military units posted in Britain before the crisis of the third century.

Some of the people expelled from Batavia by the tetrarchy were categorized by the Romans as Batavi. The Notitia Dignitatum notes the existence of prefects for "Batavian" laeti populations in Gaul — barbarians who lived within the empire and provided troops. At Arras and Condren there were prefects for Batavi laeti, and in the area of Bayeux and Coutances in what is now Normandy (Baiocas et Constantiae Lugdunensis secundae) there was a prefect for Batavian and Suebian laeti. New military units were also created from the defeated peoples in the delta, also using the name of the Batavi, which was the tribe who had previously lived in the delta and supplied well-known troops into the military, the Batavi seniores, Batavi iuniores, Equites Batavi seniores and Equites Batavi iuniores. These are likely to have included defeated Frisii and Chamavi.

While the name of the Frisii ceases to be mentioned by classical authors after this point, the new term "Franks", which covered many old peoples who lived near the Lower and Middle Rhine, became increasingly important, and it may have included many Frisii. It is possible that the so-called Salian Franks, who appear first and only time in records from around 378 together with the Chamavi south of the Rhine, may have originally been a Frisian or Chauci tribe. These Salians were given permission by Julian the apostate to continue living in Batavia, in the delta, and Texandria to the south of it. Both the Salii and the Tubantes apparently came to agreements with Rome at this time to contribute soldiers, and units were formed named after them. The Notitia dignitatum, listing Roman military units at the end of the 4th century mentions the Salii iuniores Gallicani based in Hispania, the Salii seniores based in Gaul. There is also record of a numerus Saliorum.

Although there is no consensus about it, it has been proposed that the first reported Franks in the third century may even have been Frisii. Unlike later Frankish peoples were particularly associated with coastal raiding and seafaring skills. In this scenario Frisii who moved south became Franks, while Frisii who remained in the north mixed with immigrants from the coasts to the east, stretching to Denmark, and were among the ancestors of the medieval Frisians, who spoke a language closely related to Old English.

== The disappearance of the Frisii ==
After the third century, written sources no longer mention the Frisii name, and regular early medieval use of the names "Frisia" and "Frisian" begins only in the seventh century, after a gap of more than 300 years. Archaeology suggests that this gap coincided with major population decline and cultural change in the coastal regions previously associated with the Frisii. The fourth century appears to have been the lowest point, followed by renewed growth from the fifth century onward, probably involving immigrants from the north-western German coastal area as well as people from areas where occupation had continued. The name of the medieval Frisians is therefore difficult to interpret, because it may reflect local survival, newcomers adopting the name of an older region or people, or outside reuse of a name known from classical geography.

The decline began in the third century and varied by region. In South Holland, especially near and north of the Oude Rijn, intensive Roman-period occupation seems to have ended in the second half of the third century, with little convincing evidence for habitation in the fourth, fifth and early sixth centuries. In North Holland the decline was also sharp, but some settlements, including Den Burg, Schagen and Uitgeest, continued into the fourth century or show later renewed occupation. In the northern terp region, including modern Friesland, Groningen, and East Friesland in Germany settlement declined after about AD 250 and the coastal area gradually depopulated from west to east, with lower-lying areas affected first and only some settlements continuing into the early fourth century. The northern Frisian areas show especially strong signs of disruption. Pre-Frisian place and river names are scarce or absent, and an archaeological site at Wijnaldum in Westergo has been interpreted as showing a break between about 300/350 and 425.

Renewed growth began in the fifth century. The new settlement phase is associated with cultural links to the north-western German coastal area, including pottery styles often described as "Anglo-Saxon-style". However pottery fabrics do not prove migration or importation by themselves. At continuity sites, local potters may have adopted new decoration styles, while much of the wider repopulation of the terp region probably involved immigrants from the north-western German coastal area mixed with people from areas where occupation had continued. Ezinge near Groningen is one of the main examples used to show that the northern coastal region did not follow a single pattern of total abandonment.

The causes of the decline remain uncertain. Older explanations often emphasized flooding or marine transgression, but coastal processes differed by region and environmental change cannot everywhere be shown to have caused population decline. Other proposed factors include economic disruption, political instability, raiding, piracy and changes around the Roman frontier. The evidence doesn't support the disappearance the whole population, but it does support major demographic and cultural disruption in the third to fifth centuries.

== Relationship with the Frisiavones ==
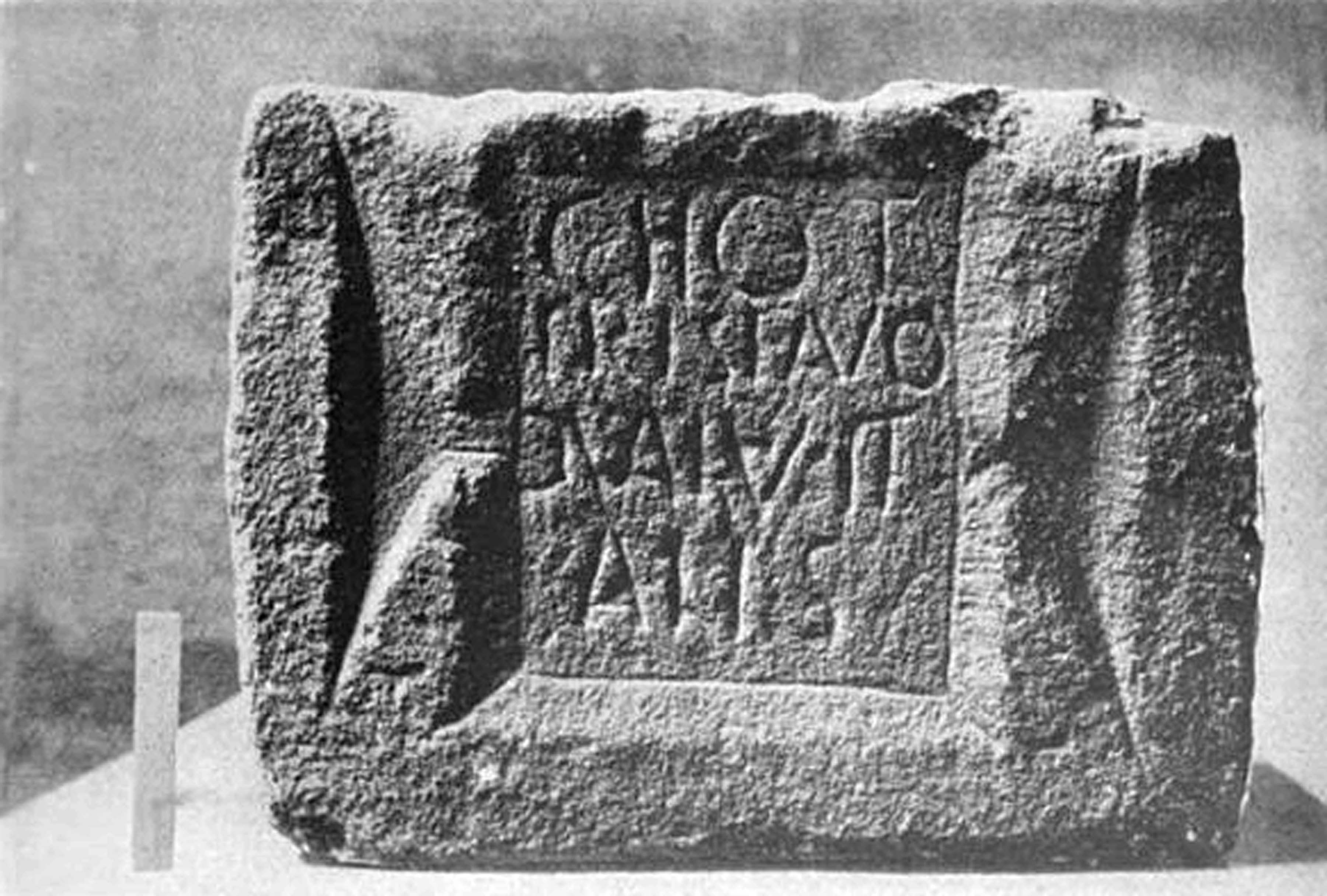
The inscription stone found at Melandra Castle

The similarly named Frisiavones are generally treated as a separate people from the Frisii by recent scholars. Pliny the Elder mentioned both names: he lists the Frisii and Frisiavones among peoples of the Rhine delta islands, but also lists the Frisiavones separately in northern Gallia Belgica, between the Sunici and Baetasi.

Roman inscriptions also point to a Frisiavonian group within the Empire, including a regio Frisiavonum in Gallia Belgica and the auxiliary unit Cohors I Frisiavonum in Britain.

In older scholarship, the Frisiavones were sometimes assumed to be the same as Tacitus's Lesser Frisii, mainly because of the similar names. This identification is now generally rejected, since Roman sources and inscriptions distinguish the two names, and no archaeological culture or territory can be securely assigned to the Frisiavones that would connect them with the Frisii of the northern coastal region.
