= Gannascus =

Pirate and chieftain of the Canninefates

Gannascus (Latin: Gannascus; died 47 AD) was a notable chieftain of the Canninefates. He is chiefly remembered for engaging in piracy on the coast of the Roman province of Gallia Belgica and for his defeat at the hands of Gnaeus Domitius Corbulo.

== Name ==
The name Gannascus is potentially related to the name Gannicus, which itself is theorized by Karl Müllenhoff to ultimately originate from the Proto-Indo-European '*g^{h}e(n)d-' meaning 'to seize' or 'to take' and the occupational suffix '-os.'

== Life ==
Not much is known about Gannascus' early life, with the exception that he had at one time served as an auxiliary soldier in the Roman army before deserting from the service and getting involved in piracy, but he was most likely born sometime in the aftermath of the Germanic Wars.

In 43 AD, after the ascension of Thumelicus as the chieftain of the Cherusci tribe, Thumelicus' uncle, Sesithacus, may have arranged a marriage alliance between Thumelicus and a Germanic princess named Rhamis (although this may be spurious). Rhamis may have been a daughter of Gannascus, but this account is contradicted by Strabo, who claims Rhamis was instead the daughter of the Chatti chieftain Ucromirus (given alternatively as "Acrumerus" according to Cluverius or "Actumerus" according to Tacitus, or even as Véromer).

Regardless of the historicity of any potential marriages, Gannascus rose to prominence in 47 AD after the death of the provincial governor Quintus Sanquinius Maximus. After the governor's death, Gannascus was chosen to lead the Chauci and Frisii tribes in raiding parties on the coast of Gallica Belgica and into the neighboring Roman province of Germania Inferior, which Sanquinius had previously overseen before his death.

To fill the vacancy created by Sanquinius' death, the emperor Claudius appointed Gnaeus Domitius Corbulo as the commander of the armies in Lower Germany. Corbulo, set on quelling the rampant piracy in his newly acquired province, immediately sent a collection of fleets into the Rhine channel. After an initial skirmish, Gannascus and his pirates were repelled out of the channel and Corbulo returned to land to construct several defensive forts along the river. At this time, Corbulo also sent ambassadors to the 'Greater Chauci' in order to negotiate a potential peace between the tribes and Rome. During one of these negotiations, Gannascus was caught in some sort of ambush by the Romans and was killed, of which Tacitus provides us the description:

This stealthy attempt on the life of a deserter and a traitor was not unsuccessful, nor was it anything ignoble. Yet the Chauci were violently roused by the man's death, and Corbulo was now sowing the seeds of another revolt, thus getting a reputation which many liked, but of which many thought ill.

Hearing word of the renewed revolution, Claudius immediately ordered Corbulo and his armies to retreat back across the west bank of the Rhine and to go no further into the lands of the Chauci again, establishing a tenuous peace that would last until the Revolt of the Batavi some twenty years later.

== Legacy ==
Although his death may have been premature, Gannascus' legacy lives on. He is the first recorded Dutch pirate known to us by name, and is even considered by some to be the first known Viking. Even in his own time, Julius Civilis is said to have considered Gannascus as a central role model alongside Arminius, and as an inspiration for his own revolt against the Romans.

== See also ==
- Cananefates
- Chauci
- List of pirates
