= Frisiavones =

Germanic tribe

The Frisiavones (also Frisaevones or Frisaebones) were a people of Roman era Gaul living near the northern border of Gallia Belgica during the Roman Empire. Little is known about them, but they appear to have resided in the area of what is today the southern Netherlands, possibly in two distinct regions, one in the islands of the river deltas of Holland, and one to the southeast of it.

== Name ==
=== Attestations ===
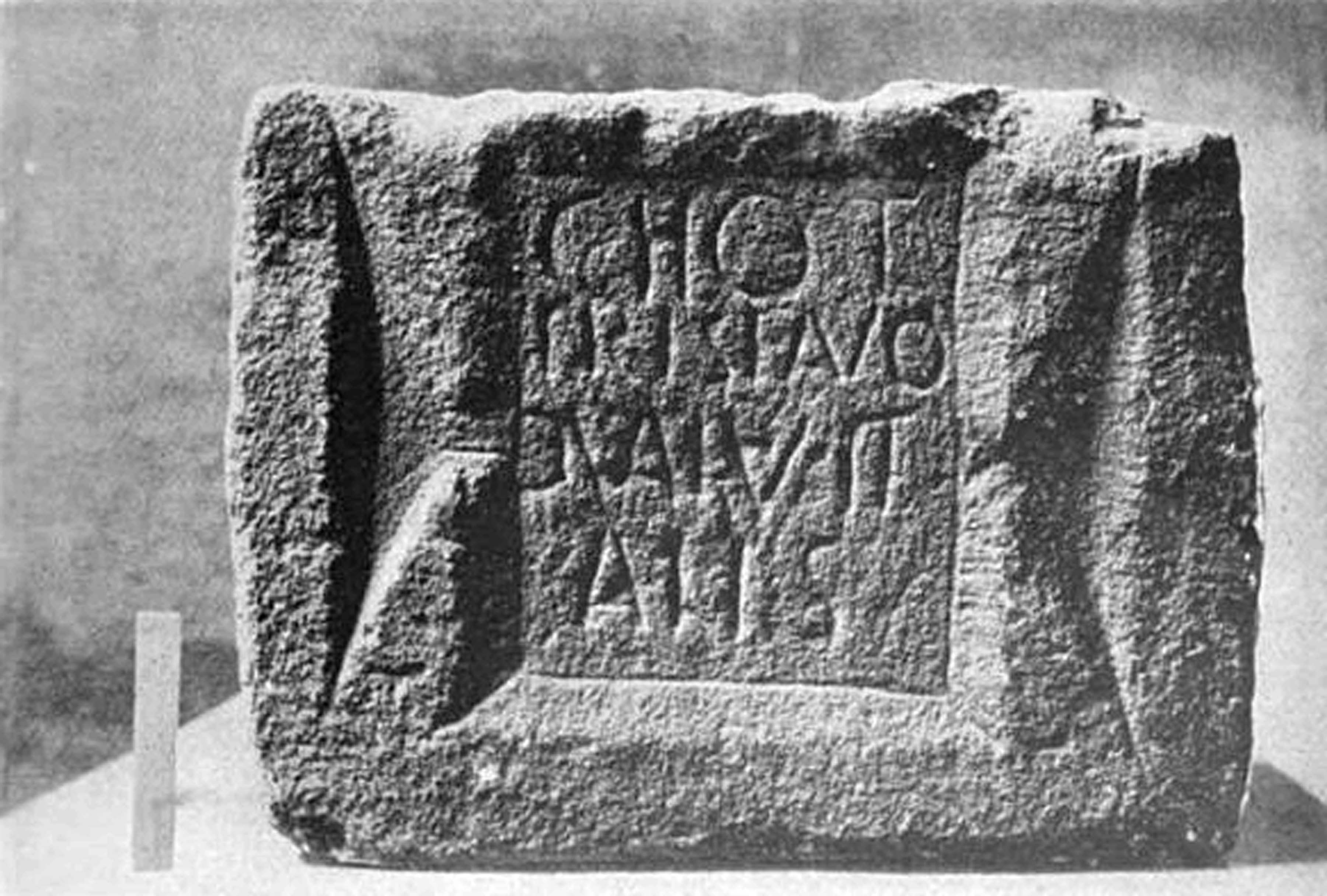
Stone found at Melandra Castle, bearing the inscription "Velerius Vitalis, Centurion of the First Cohort of the Frisiavones".

The name Frisiavones is only mentioned in one classical text, the Naturalis Historia by the Roman writer Pliny the Elder, published in 77 AD. In Roman-era epigraphy, however, it appears several times. The earliest inscriptions referring to the Frisiavones date back to the early 2nd century AD, and are found on votive, funerary and military monuments. Six Roman military diplomas in particular, issued by Roman emperors in Britain in the years 105–178 AD, complemented by five inscriptions found in Roman forts in Britain, mention a cohort named Frisiavonum or Frisiavon.

Besides the purely graphic variation Frisaebones, an o-stem *Fris(i)avi may also be attested in the Matribus Frisavis Paternis and the dative singular Frisao, which is probably an inaccurate spelling of *Frisavo.

=== Etymology ===
According to Günter Neumann, the phonology of Frisiavones, the initial f- in particular, suggests a Germanic origin. It is presumed to stem from the tribal name Frisi attached to the suffix -avo-, and may have meant 'those belonging to the Frisii, descending from the Frisii'. However, scholars note that no historical or geographical relation can be established between the Frisii and the Frisiavones apart from the similarity of name.

== Geography ==
The Frisiavones are not listed among the Germani Cisrhenani by Caesar, which suggests that they settled later in the region, possibly invited by Agrippa during the reorganization of the newly conquered lands in northern Gauls during the second part of the 1st century BC. The Roman writer Pliny, who had visited the region in 47 AD, seems to associate the name Frisiavones with two distinct areas. In his description of the inhabitants of the islands of the Rhine–Meuse–Scheldt delta, he lists the Frisiavones as an ethnic group distinct from the Frisii, along with Batavians, Canninefates, Chauci, Sturii and Marsaci. In his description of Gallia Belgica, he lists the Frisiavones again, this time between the Baetasi and Sunuci, and not with "the Batavi, and the peoples whom we have already mentioned as dwelling on the islands of the Rhine".

Tacitus, writing in the second half of the 1st century AD, divides the Frisii into two groups: the Greater Frisii (maiores) and the Lesser Frisii (minores). Most authors agree that the Frisii were in fact divided among Greater and Lesser, and they generally place the Lesser Frisii in North Holland, and the Greater Frisii in Friesland and Groningen. However, scholars generally reject the identification of the Lesser Frisii with the Frisiavones since the Frisii and Frisiavones were clearly perceived as two distinct groups by Roman writers of the 2nd century AD.

No specific archaeological culture can be associated with the Frisiavones, and we have no archaeological indication regarding their territory. Based on epigraphic evidence, a number of scholars associate their homeland with the western part of North Brabant, southern South Holland, or Zeeland. One votive inscription from the 2nd century AD refers to the regio frisiavonum as part of Gallia Belgica. Edith Wightman proposed that the borders of Germania Inferior lay west and south of the Meuse rather than around it, thus including the territory of the Frisiavones near the Batavi, Marsaci and Sturii. She mentions one inscription from Bulla Regia that refers to an area comprising the Tungri, Batavians and Frisiavones, and thus stretching over two provinces.

Although the capital of their civitas is not known, they were treated as a separated region and had to pay taxes to Rome, suggesting that the Frisiavones lived in a Romanized society. According to Wightman, the Marsaci and the Sturii could have been pagi (smaller geographical units) within the civitas of the Frisiavones, or else in that of the Menapii.

== Roman military service ==
The Frisiavones are better attested in Roman military records than in classical literature. Unlike the Frisii, who remained outside the Roman Empire, Galestin argues that the Frisiavones were incorporated into the Empire and had their own named ethnic auxiliary unit, the Cohors I Frisiavonum. The cohort was probably formed in the first century AD, perhaps after the Batavian revolt of 69–70 AD, and is attested in Britain by a series of Roman military diplomas from 105 to 178 AD.

The cohort is also known from building inscriptions in northern Britain. Three or four cohort stones from Mamucium (Manchester) name the First Cohort of the Frisiavones, and another building inscription from Ardotalia (Melandra Castle) names the century of Valerius Vitalis of the same cohort. These records distinguish the Frisiavones from the Frisii, who are not known from a named auxiliary cohort in the second century but are later attested in Britain in units called cunei Frisiorum or cunei Frisionum.

Individual Frisiavones may also have served in the equites singulares Augusti, the imperial horseguards at Rome. Several funerary inscriptions from their cemetery give origin names such as Frisaoni, Frisiavo or Frisaevone, although some fragmentary forms are uncertain and Galestin cautions that not every similar form should automatically be assigned to the Frisiavones. The presence of men named T. Flavius among these inscriptions may indicate that some Frisiavones received Roman citizenship in the Flavian period, possibly after the Batavian revolt.

The Frisiavones are still attested in a military context in the third century. An altar from Brocolitia (Carrawburgh) on Hadrian's Wall was dedicated by Mausaeus, optio of the First Cohort of the Frixiavones, a spelling generally taken as a variant of Frisiavones. The late Roman Notitia Dignitatum lists a tribunus cohortis primae Frixagorum at Vindobala (Rudchester). This has often been treated as a corrupt or altered form of the same unit name rather than as evidence for a separate people.

== Culture ==
The areas usually attributed to the Frisiavones do not match with the regions where 'Frisian' pottery has been found, suggesting that the material cultures of the Frisii and Frisiavones were not related.

The name of a goddess, Matres Frisavae Paternea, found on a votive near Xanten, has been interpreted as related to the Frisiavones, although it could also bear the name of the Frisii.

== Political organization ==
The Frisiavones were possibly clients of the Batavi, for whom they supplied auxiliary troops and contingents that came to be incorporated into Batavian units of the Roman army. This situation may have persisted until the Batavian revolt (69–70 AD). According to Nico Roymans, "after the Batavian revolt the Frisiavones and the Cananefates were given an opportunity to express their own identity."

From the end of the 1st century, the Frisiavones were active participants in the Roman army, and they were given their own ethnic unit, the Cohors I Frisiavonum, formed at the latest around 80 AD. The Cohors was active in Britain during the 2nd century. Some Frisiavones also served in the equites singulares of the Roman Praetorian Guard, which could mean that they were granted Roman citizenship during the Flavian period.
