= Fectio =

Former Roman castellum, village in Netherlands

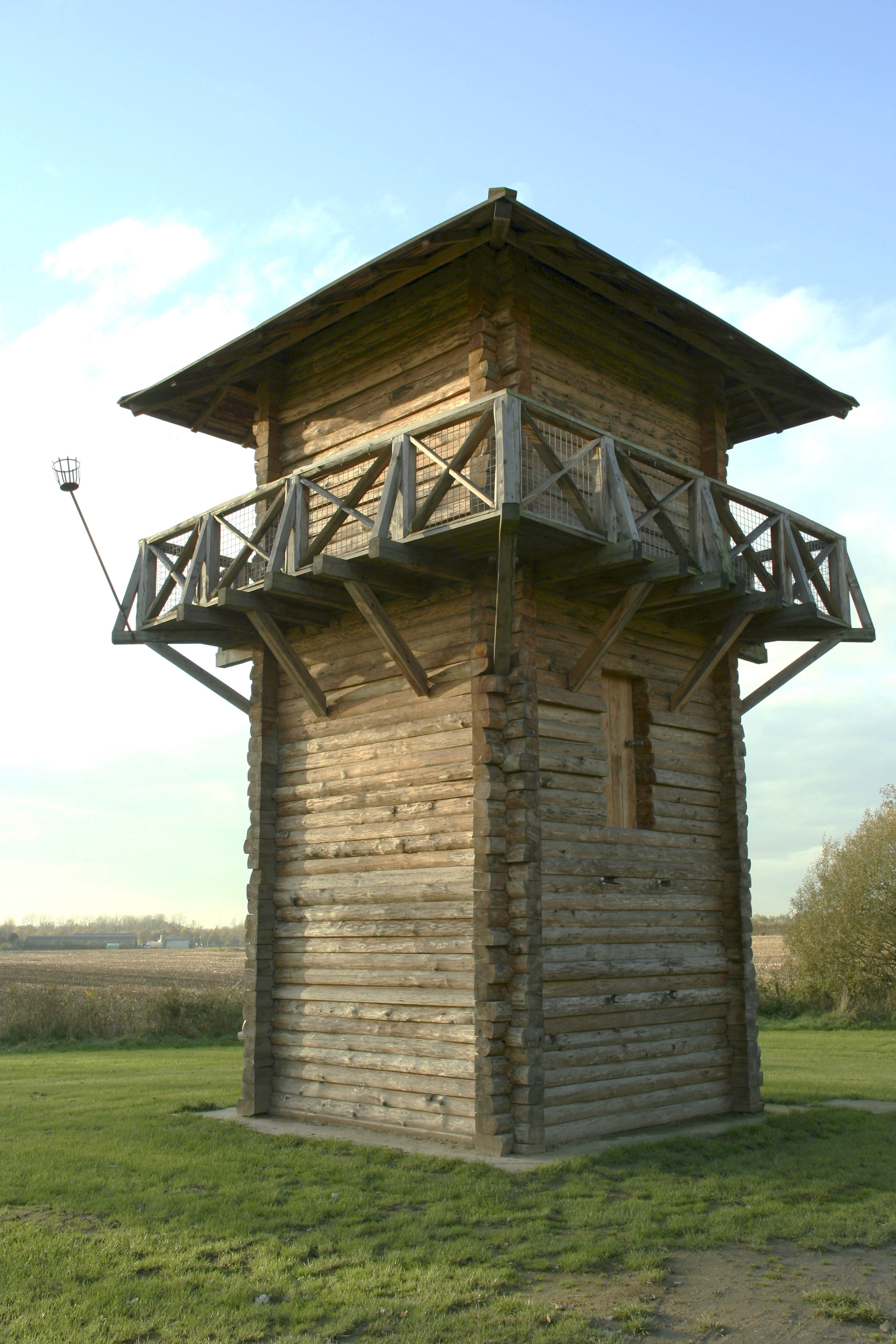
- Reconstruction of a watch tower near Fectio

- Location within Netherlands
- 52°3′23″N 5°9′54″E
- Type: Castellum
- Location: Utrecht, Netherlands
- Region: Germania Inferior

UNESCO World Heritage Site
- Part of: Frontiers of the Roman Empire – The Lower German Limes
- Criteria: Cultural: ii, iii, iv
- Reference: 1631-020
- Inscription: 2021 (44th Session)

Fectio, known as Vechten in Old Dutch, was a Roman castellum in the province Germania Inferior established in the year 4 or 5 AD. It was located at the place where the river Vecht (Fectio) branched off from the Rhine, leading to Lake Flevo, which was later to become the Zuiderzee. This was near the modern hamlet of Vechten in the municipality Bunnik, Utrecht, Netherlands.

== History ==
Imperial Roman coinage reveals that the castellum was built by order of Tiberius, then engaged in his campaign of 4–5 AD. It was probably used as a starting point for cross-border punitive raids. In 40 AD the emperor Caligula visited Fectio during the trip to Lugdunum Batavorum, the ancient Brittenburg. In its vineyards, the remains of an ancient postage stamp were discovered during the excavations of 1995.

Under the emperor Claudius, Fectio became part of the Rhine limes. Then around 70 AD, at the time of the Batava revolt, the castellum was completely burned. It was later rebuilt by a cavalry squadron. The accumulation of Rhine sediments began to change its path. Pottery from the XXII Primigenia legion has been discovered in "Castra Vetera", near present-day Xanten.

During the reign of Antoninus Pius, between 138 and 161 AD, the fortress was rebuilt, this time of brick and stone. Around 200 AD, it seems that the continuous sediments of the river prevented access to the boats. It was abandoned in 275 AD and was never rebuilt.

== Data ==
Under emperor Claudius, Fectio became part of the Limes Germanicus. The archeological site contains the remains of a fort, port, cemetery, and a civilian settlement.

In 1995, it was submitted to the tentative list of World Heritage Sites. The site was added to the World Heritage List in 2021 as part of the Lower Germanic Limes.

From 1 June 2023 to 31 October 2024 there is a small exhibit of the hundred most important finds in the Rijksmuseum van Oudheden. One of the finds is an altar stone which has the name 'Fectio'. The low oxygen content of the ground makes that many wooden and leather artefacts were preserved.

== See also ==
- Germania Antiqua
- Flevum
- Waldgirmes Forum
- Roman camp, Marktbreit
