= Sunuci =

Germanic tribe

The Sunuci or Sunici were a small people who lived near present day Aachen in the first century, when the region was within the Roman Empire. There are only two clear mentions of the Sunuci, by first-century Roman authors. Pliny the Elder implied that they were neighbours of the Tungri and Tacitus clearly indicated that they were neighbours of the Ubii in Cologne.

They are also associated with the name of a goddess Sunux(s)alis who is mentioned in votive inscriptions in the area between Aachen and Cologne, and north of the Eifel forest.

They joined in the Batavian revolt in 69 AD, and were described as part of an army of Germani in that context, so it is possible that they spoke a Germanic language, but this is uncertain.

== Attestations in literature ==
The Sunuci were not among the peoples listed by Julius Caesar in his account of the region in the period of 58-50 BC, but he named several peoples in the region that were collectively called the Germani, the most important of which were the Eburones he described as living in a territory mainly between the Meuse and Rhine, and stretching between areas close to the tidal islands of the Rhine-Meuse delta in the north, and the Ardennes forest in the south. Scholars consider it likely that the Sunuci were originally a part of the Eburones, whose country Caesar had destroyed.

Pliny the Elder, writing around 70 AD, included the Tungri, Sunuci, Frisiavones and Baetasi together in a longer list of the peoples of Gallia Belgica (Belgic Gaul) living between the Seine and the mouth of the Scheldt, and explicitly not counting the coastal peoples or the Germanic people living on the Rhine itself. Scholars interpret this as making it likely that they were neighbours of the Tungri whose capital was in present-day Tongeren, west of Maastricht.

Writing in about 100 AD, Tacitus mentioned the involvement of the Sunuci in the Batavian revolt of 69 AD. When the rebel leader Gaius Julius Civilis had a firm alliance with the city of Cologne, the next thing he resolved to do was to win over the neighbouring communities, and the first one mentioned is the Sunuci. He then organized their young men into cohorts, but he was prevented from advancing farther westwards by Claudius Labeo, who opposed him with a force made up of Baetasii, Tungri, and Nervii, and held the bridge over the river Meuse, probably at Maastricht.

== Attestations in dedications ==
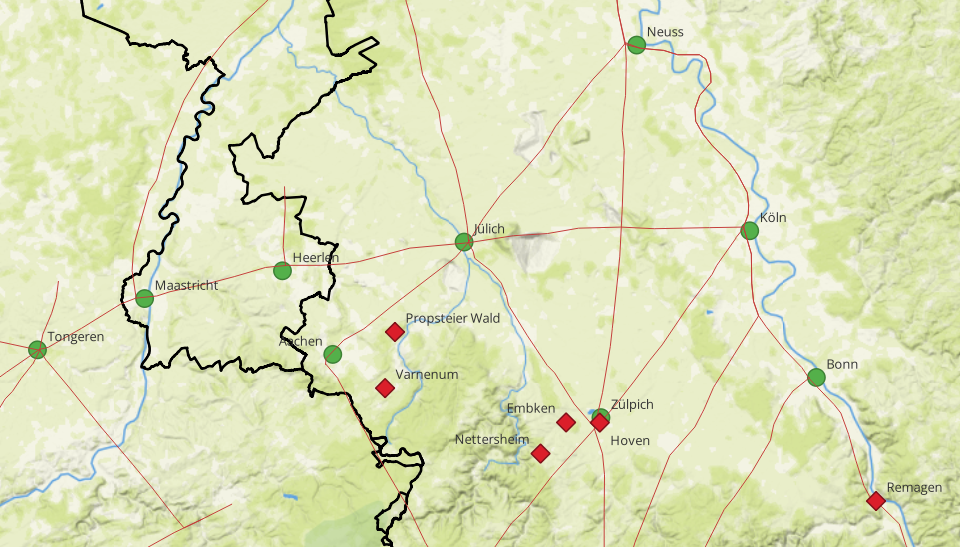
The red diamonds show locations where Roman era dedications have been found to the goddess Sunuxalis

Apart from the dedications to her found on the Lower Rhine military frontier, dedications to the goddess Sunux(s)alis have been found in the following places: Propsteier Wald near Eschweiler, Embken in Nideggen, Hoven near Zülpich, Heimbach, and Kornelimünster.

== Location ==
Based on the description of Tacitus, and the distribution of dedications to the goddess Sunuxalis the Sunuci apparently lived between the Tungri whose capital was in Tongeren, and the Ubii, whose capital was in Cologne. The dedications show a certain concentration in the valley of the Inde river.

== Name and language ==
The etymology of the name Sunici is uncertain, but there are several proposals which have attempted to give a Proto-Indo-European (PIE) explanation.

- The first part could derive from the PIE root *sūs/*suwó ("pig" or "sow"), or alternatively from PIE *sunus ("sons"). Another proposal which has been made is that it is from a prefix *su- meaning good.
- The second part of the name containing a k-sound has been proposed to be a typical Germanic diminutive-form. The name might have therefore meant "the young sons". The name may have indicated that the tribe was founded by a group of young colonist who split off from an older tribe such as the Eburones, and this has been related to a customer such as the Italic Ver Sacrum.

Some scholars argue that both the PIE roots *sūs and *sunus are absent in Celtic languages, and this is an argument for the ethnonym being more probably Germanic origin.

A Germanic form *Sunuc(a)-saliō- ('whom provides the Sunici with housing') has also been proposed for the name of the goddess Sunuxal.

== Religion ==
Two deity names have been associated with the Sunuci, a goddess Sunux(s)al(is) and a god Varnenos or Varneno. Varnenum was the name of a temple near Kornelimünster and Aachen.

Dedications to their eponymous goddess Sunux(s)al(is) have been found across the territory between Aachen and Cologne. She was probably regarded as the original epithet of a tribal goddess.

== Roman military ==
They contributed troops to the Roman military. A Roman cohort the cohors I Sunucorum is attested from the early 2nd century onward.

Some were stationed in Britain, including modern Wales. There is evidence from tablets found in the Rivelin Valley south of Stannington that retiring Roman auxiliaries of the Sunuci tribe stationed in Britain were made grants of citizenship and land or money in the modern day city of Sheffield, with some speculation that a Roman villa complex at Whirlow Hall Farm was part of such a land grant.

== Disappearance ==
What happened to Sunuci in the later part of the Roman era is uncertain. Their territory became the home of new groups who crossed the Rhine, part of the amalgamation of tribes known as the Franks. The Franks united under kings and later became semi-independent within the empire, started moving into more populated Romanized areas to their south, and then proceeded to conquer a large part of Western Europe and found the Holy Roman Empire. If any of the Sunuci remained in the area, they became part of this development.

== Bibliography ==
- Heinrichs, Johannes (2001), "Römische Perfidie und germanischer Edelmut? Zur Umsiedlung protocugernischer Gruppen in den Raum Xanten 8 v.", in Grünewald, Thomas (ed.), Germania inferior. Besiedlung, Gesellschaft und Wirtschaft an der Grenze der römisch-germanischen Welt, Reallexikon der Germanischen Altertumskunde - Ergänzungsbände, vol. 28, De Gruyter, pp. 54–92, ISBN 978-3-11-016969-0
- Neumann, Günter (1999). "Germani cisrhenani — die Aussage der Namen". In Beck, Heinrich; Geuenich, Dieter; Steuer, Heiko (eds.). Germanenprobleme in heutiger Sicht. Walter de Gruyter. ISBN 978-3110164381.
- Reichert, Hermann (2001), "Linksrheinische Germanen", in Beck, Heinrich; Geuenich, Dieter; Steuer, Heiko (eds.), Reallexikon der Germanischen Altertumskunde, vol. 18 (2 ed.), De Gruyter, pp. 483–494, ISBN 978-3-11-016950-8
- Sergent, Bernard (1991). "Ethnozoonymes indo-européens". Dialogues d'histoire ancienne. 17 (2): 9–55. doi:10.3406/dha.1991.1932.
- von Petrikovits, Harald (1999). "Germani Cisrhenani". In Beck, Heinrich; Geuenich, Dieter; Steuer, Heiko (eds.). Germanenprobleme in heutiger Sicht. Walter de Gruyter. ISBN 978-3110164381.
