= Claudius Labeo =

Batavian military leader (fl. 69–70 AD)

Claudius Labeo (1st. ct. AD) was a Batavian and a military leader in the service of the Roman Empire at the time of the Batavian rebellion. He was prefect of the Batavian ala of auxiliaries, which went over from Lupercus to Civilis.

Civilis, whose rival he was in their native town, not being willing to incur the odium of putting him to death, and yet fearing that, if allowed to remain with his army, he might excite disaffection, sent him as a prisoner among the Frisii. He afterwards escaped, and offered his services to Vocula, who gave him a small force, with, which he carried on an irregular warfare against the insurgents. He was defeated by Civilis, who, however, tried in vain to crush him.
