= Old Rhine =

Old Rhine or Oude Rijn may refer to:

- Oude Rijn (Gelderland), a long former bend in river Rhine in the Dutch province of Gelderland
- Oude Rijn (Utrecht and South Holland), a branch of the Rhine delta in the Dutch provinces of Utrecht and South Holland
- Alter Rhein, the old river bed of the Alpine Rhine in St. Gallen and Vorarlberg in the Alpine Rhine Valley

== See also ==
- List of old waterbodies of the Rhine
