= Flevum =

Roman fort in the Netherlands

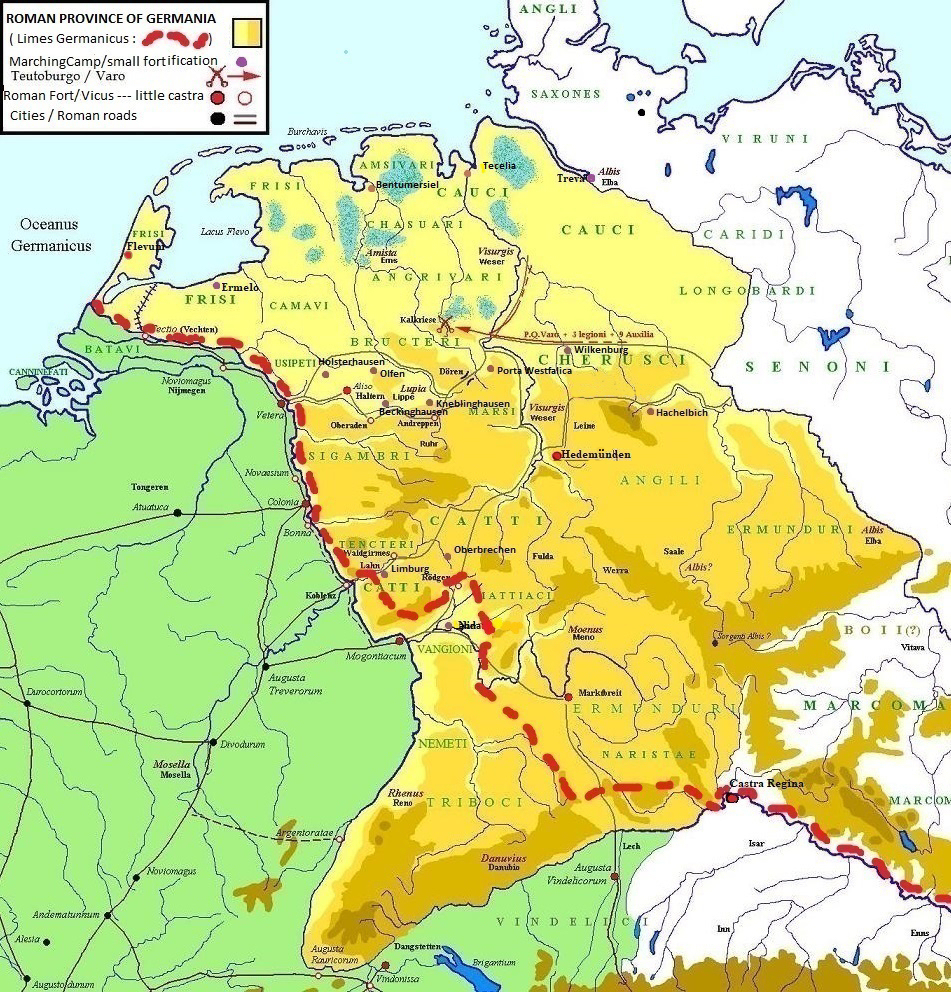
Location of Flevum castrum/port in the northwest of Germania Inferior near Fectio

Flevum was a castrum and port of the Romans in Frisia (actual northern Netherlands), built when emperor Augustus wanted to conquer the German populated territories between the Rhine river and the Elbe river.

== History ==
Two Roman fortifications (usually called Flevum I and Flevum II) have been discovered at the mouth of modern North Sea Canal: the first was initially a small marching camp made by Tiberius (similar to the nearby Ermelo fortification built in 4 AD), and later enlarged to be a castrum and a port by Germanicus around 14 AD. The second was built by Caligula in 40 AD, 2 km to the northwest of the first. Both the fortifications were inside the western area of Magna Germania that was the short-lived Germania Inferior.

Like Fectio/Vechten, Flevum was a naval base. It controlled an important watercourse, the Oer-IJ, the northernmost outlet of the river Rhine, and an exit of Lake Flevo. According to the numismatic evidence, the fort was built in 14 AD, which suggests that it was meant to support the offensives of the Roman general Germanicus, who conducted several retaliatory campaigns in Germany after the Roman defeat in the Teutoburg Forest in 9 AD. After a modest beginning (1 ha), (Flevum) Velsen became a pretty large base (2 ha), with a river port, four piers or jetties, and several ship-sheds. Livius

Indeed the ruins of a Roman naval base at actual Velsen (Netherlands) are believed to be the ancient Flevum, which is listed as Phleoum, Romanized to Phleum, in Ptolemy (2.10).

The first fortification was rather a simple and temporary construction site. Its ground plan was more or less triangular and covered an area of about one hectare. The defense systems consisted mainly of an earth wall with an upstream, simple trench. A wooden palisade with a wooden gate defended the eastern part of the river bank. This camp did not yet have port functions initially, although ships could lie on the gently sloping river bank. Shortly thereafter, the wooden fence was reinforced with a reinforced door. This harbor gate gave access to a short open jetty where larger ships could be loaded and unloaded so they would not have to be pulled into the countryside. This castrum was enlarged to 2 hectares.

Since the middle of the 1980s, shipsheds have been known from Haltern-Hofestatt and from Flevum; they constitute the only remains of roman shipsheds so far known. The most extensive is that of Haltern, with dimensions of 56 x 32 m, and consisting of eight slipways (fig.18, below). These slipways, approximately 6 m wide, could contain galleys over 30 m long...the first shipshed was built in the western part of the (Flevum) fort, at a short distance from the shore. The dimensions, 6.1 x 22.1 m, point towards a small galley. It lay so close to the river, that the above-mentioned scouring overwhelmed, or washed away, part of it...(then) the shipshed was moved some 30 m southwards. Shape and dimensions, 6.4 x 20.5 m, where very similar to the first shipshed...(later) a completely new shipshed was built, this time double and with dimensions of 29.7 x 12.2 m.J.-M.A.W.Morel

Shipsheds have been discovered in Flevum.

The second fort -Flevum II- was built after the destruction of the first castrum around 28 AD, but has left few archaeological evidences. It seems to have survived only until 55 AD.

== Maps Gallery ==
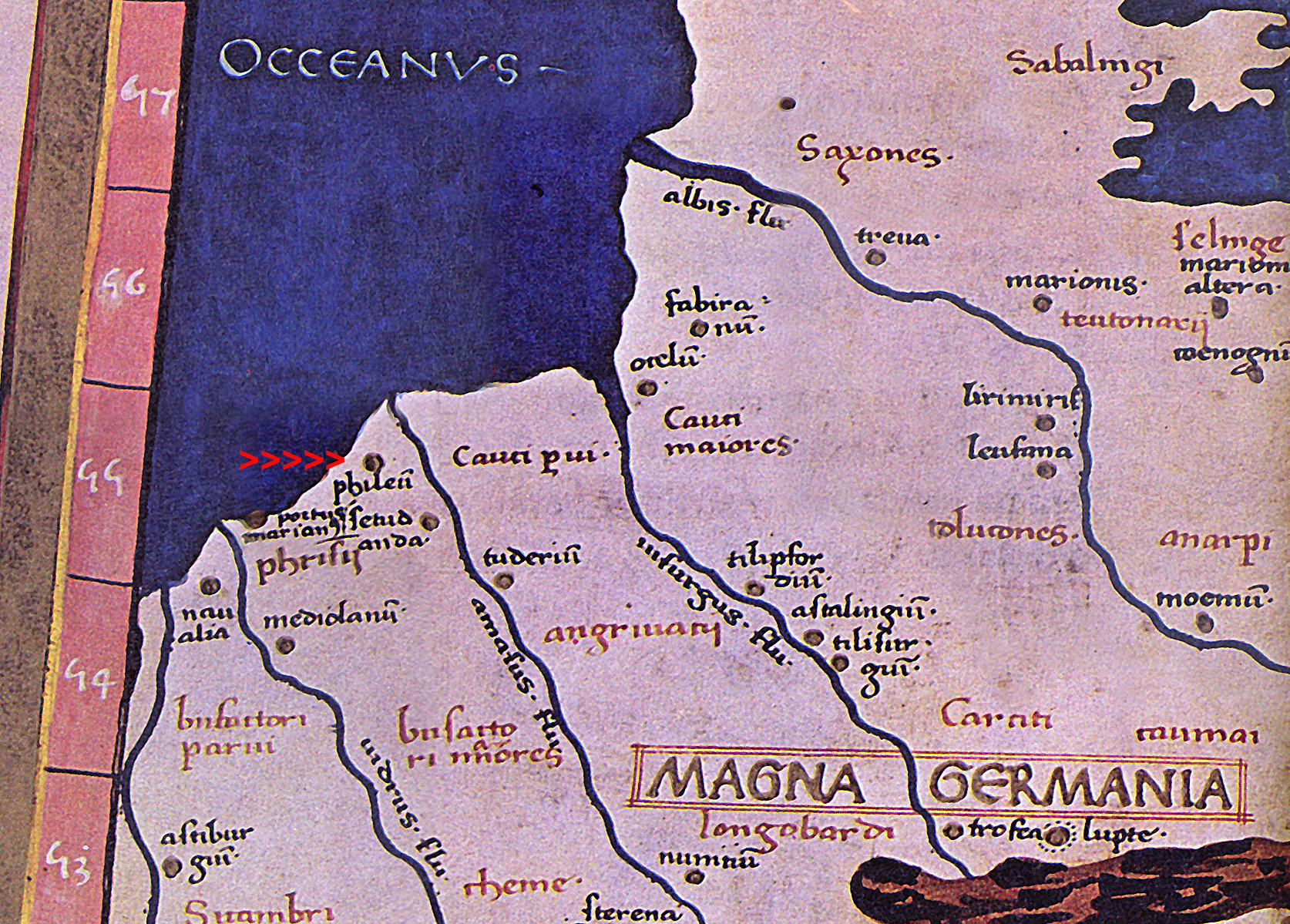
Flevum - Phileu

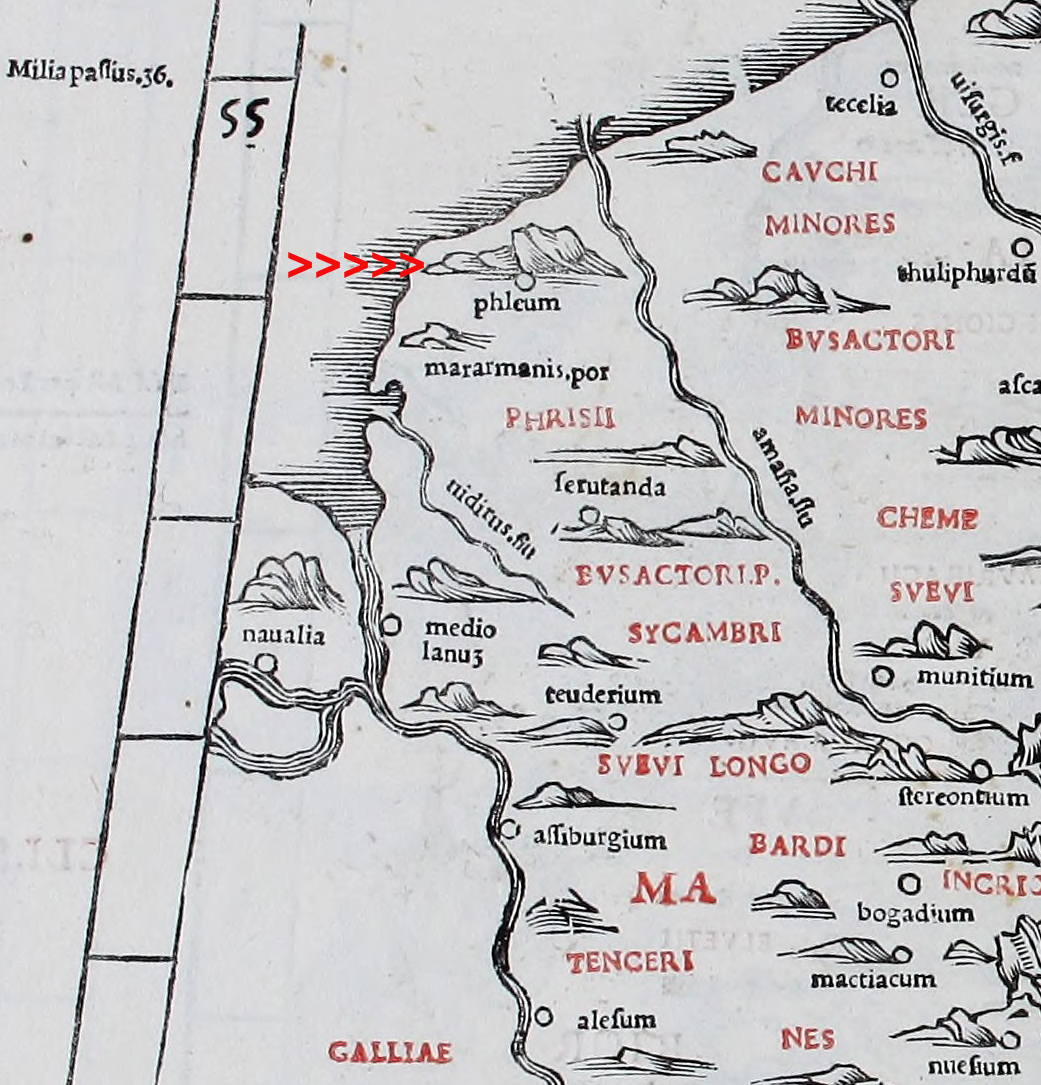
Flevum - Phleum (1511)

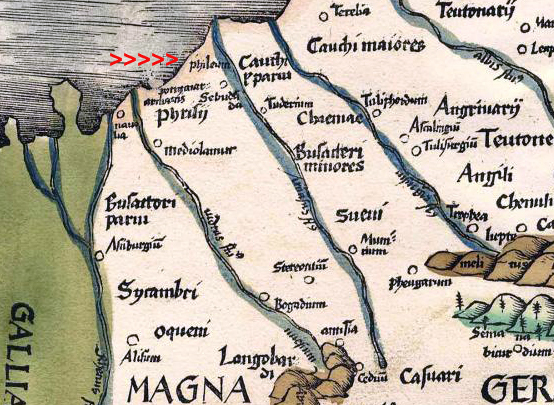
Flevum -Phileum (1513)

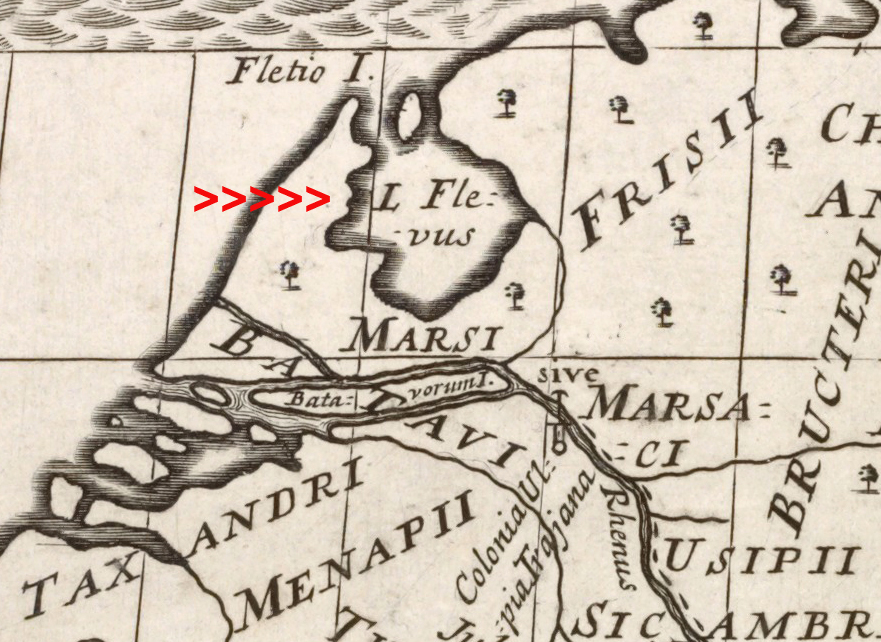
Flevum - L.[acus] Flevus (1700)

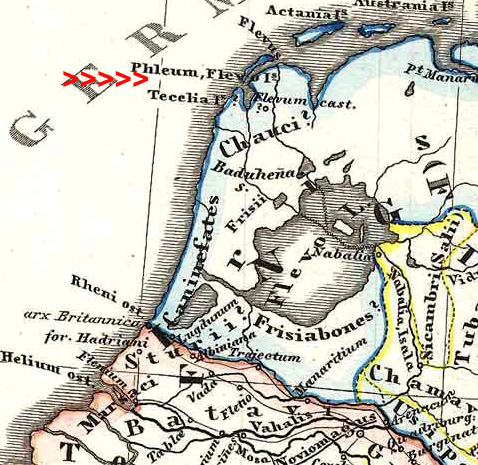
Flevum - Phleum, Flevo, Flevus and Flevum cast.[ellum] (1865)

== See also ==
- Germania
- Fectio

== Bibliography ==
- Saskia G. van Dockum: Das niederländische Flussgebiet. In: Tilmann Bechert und Willem J. H. Willems (Hrsg.): Die römische Reichsgrenze zwischen Mosel und Nordseeküste. Theiss, Stuttgart 1995, ISBN 3-8062-1189-2, S. 79.
- J.-M.A.W.Morel. The early roman harbours. Velsen, in: R.W.Brandt, W.Groenman-van Waateringe & S.E.van der Leeuw (eds.), Assendelver Polder Papers 1, Amsterdam 1987, pags. 169-175.
