= Haras (unit) =

Personal bodyguards of the Caliphs

Haras الحرس
- Active: 660s – 1250s
- Allegiance: Caliphate
- Branch: Caliphal Army
- Type: Personal bodyguards
- Role: The personal bodyguards of the caliphs. Haras members were known to guard the caliph even during private meetings, at night and during prayers at the mosque
- Size: Size of the haras varied
- Equipment: Lances or short spears (hirab), Iron clubs or maces (Umud), Whips, Swords, Chains

The haras (Arabic: الحرس; "the Guard") was a personal bodyguard unit of the caliphs during the Umayyad and the Abbasid periods. The haras was also instituted in the Umayyad Emirate of Córdoba in modern-day Spain.

== Origin ==
=== Muhammad's era ===
The Haras was depicted for the first time during the time of Muhammad, Prophet of Islam, where several early Muslims such as Abu Bakr, Sa'd ibn Abi Waqqas, Sa'd ibn Mu'adh, Dhakwan ibn Abd al-Qays, Zubayr ibn al-Awwam, Bilal ibn Rabah, Abbad ibn Bishr, and Abu Ayyub al-Ansari served as the prophet's personal Haras.

=== Rashidun Caliphate era ===
During the ascension of Abu Bakr as the first Rashidun caliph after the death of Muhammad and the outbreak of the Ridda Wars, the Haras wa al-Shurta units under Ali ibn Abi Talib, Sa'd ibn Abi Waqqas, and Zubayr ibn al-Awwam saw combat in the Battle of Dhu al-Qassah against the rebels who attacked Medina, and later in pursuing the rebels towards Dumat al-Jandal. The caliph had resorted to the use of this unit because the main army of the caliphate was engaged in the Expedition of Balqa, led by Usama ibn Zayd.

=== Umayyad Caliphate in Damascus ===
The haras also appeared during the rule of Mu'awiya I (r. 661–680), the first Umayyad caliph. Most classical accounts reported that he established the haras after an assassination attempt on him. He appointed a mawla, Muslim Abu Abdullah as its chief, and built a guarded room for him inside the mosque that was surrounded by haras members during prayer time. He also had members of the haras walk in front of him with lances in formal processions.

=== Emirate of Córdoba ===
In the Umayyad Emirate of Córdoba, Al-Haras was established by Al-Hakam I, the Umayyad Emir of Córdoba (796–822) in 805. The haras were led by the Visigothic leader of the secular Christians in Cordoba, the Comes (Count) Rabi, son of Theodulf, who also served as the Emir's tax collector. Rabi was later removed and executed by crucifixion for alleged misappropriations.

Professor Christopher I. Beckwith has compared the haras to other royal bodyguard units of Indo-European societies, generally referred to as Comitatus.

== Service ==
=== Organization ===
The haras was led by a chief, who frequently also held security-related and administrative positions such as responsibility for the official seal, the office of chamberlain, and office of correspondence. The qualification for the chief position likely include military skills, physical strength, loyalty to the caliph and administrative skills. Most of the known haras chiefs were mawali, freedman of non-Arab background. It was likely that many members were mawlas as well. The reason for choosing non-Arabs was the lack of tribal loyalties that might compromise an Arab's loyalty to the caliph. It is not uncommon for a person related to the Haras chief to succeed him.

The size of the haras varied, ranging from 300 during the reign of Umar ibn Abd al-Aziz to 500 during the reign of al-Mahdi.

=== Weapon ===
Accounts concerning the haras mentioned that its members were armed with lances or short spears called hirab (plural of harba) and iron clubs or maces called 'umud. Other accounts also said that the members used whips. The chiefs commonly used swords, and their appointment occasionally were accompanied by ceremonially receiving a sword. The chiefs were also reported to use chains as instrument for torture.

=== Function ===
The main role of the haras was to act as the personal bodyguards of the caliphs. Haras members were known to guard the caliph even during private meetings, at night and during prayers at the mosque.

Occasionally, they were also used by the reigning caliph to intimidate political opposition. For example, when Mu'awiya demanded that individuals accept his son Yazid as his successor and pledge allegiance to him, haras members were sent to intimidate reluctant individuals. Yazid was also reported to have sent some haras members to Abd Allah ibn al-Zubayr to ensure his allegiance.

== See also ==
- Anglo-Saxon military organization
- Comitatus
- Druzhina
- Qurchi (royal bodyguard)
- Shurta
- Fyrd
- Gabiniani
- German Guard
- Hird
- Huskarl
- Rashidun army
- Leidang
- Mannerbund
- Maryannu
- Mesedi
- Somatophylakes
- Thingmen
- Varangian Guard

== Sources ==
- Wolf, Kenneth Baxter (8 May 2014). Christian Martyrs in Muslim Spain. Cambridge University Press. pp. 13–14. ISBN 978-1107634817.
- Beckwith, Christopher I. (2009). Empires of the Silk Road: A History of Central Eurasia from the Bronze Age to the Present. Princeton University Press. p. 25. ISBN 978-1400829941.
- Perlman, Yaara (2015). "The Bodyguard of the Caliphs During the Umayyad and the Early Abbasid Periods". Al-Qanṭara. 36 (2): 315–340. doi:10.3989/alqantara.2015.009. ISSN 1988-2955.
