= Mesedi =

Bodyguards of the king of the Hittites

The Mesedi was the personal bodyguard of the king of the Hittites. The Mesedi was led by the Gal mesedi, who held considerable prestige in Hittite society. The Mesedi were a unit of 12 spearmen who protected the king wherever he might go. They probably numbered more in total in order to protect the king at all hours. They were reinforced and probably monitored by another unit numbering 12, known as the "golden spearmen." The Mesedi's purpose was the protection of the king against assassinations, which was endemic to the Hittite nobility. They also played a prominent role during festivals.

Professor Christopher I. Beckwith has compared the Mesedi to other royal bodyguard units of Indo-European societies, empires and civilisations, generally referred to as Comitatus.

== See also ==
- Mannerbund
- Anglo-Saxon military organization
- Huskarl
- Druzhina
- Hird
- Comitatus
- Al-Haras
- Gabiniani
- Somatophylakes
- Maryannu
- Varangian Guard
- German Guard
- Leidang
- Fyrd
- Thingmen

== Sources ==
- Beckwith, Christopher I. (16 March 2009). Empires of the Silk Road: A History of Central Eurasia from the Bronze Age to the Present. Princeton University Press. p. 38. ISBN 978-1400829941.
- Burney, Charles (2004). Historical Dictionary of the Hittites. Scarecrow Press. pp. 234–235. ISBN 0810865645.
