= Baetasii =

Roman era Germanic people from Lower Maas

The Baetasii were a Germanic people who lived during Roman times west of present day Xanten, probably between the Maas and Niers rivers, along part of the modern border between Germany and the Netherlands.

They are known from only a small number of classical records. During the time of the Julio-Claudian dynasty in the first century at least one of the Baestasi was a member of the elite Germanic bodyguard of the emperor Nero.

They were involved in the Batavian revolt of 69 AD, when they switched sides to join the Germanic rebels—an event which probably occurred at Maastricht.

After the rebellion, the Baetasii and neighbouring Cugerni became part of the new Roman colony Colonia Ulpia Traiana in 98-99 AD, where Roman veterans who had become citizens could settle. It had its capital near modern-day Xanten, in the territory of the Cugerni.

A Roman cohort was also formed from the Baetasii by 103 AD and named after them, the Cohors Baetasiorum. This cohort served in Roman Britain from the second until the fourth centuries.

== Name and language ==
The etymology of the name Baetasii is uncertain, but several proposals have been made. Both Celtic and Germanic languages give possible explanations.

Germanic explanations have included derivations from *baita- ("boat") and from words related to "bite", "hunt" or "bitter".

A Celtic explanation is based on Old and Middle Irish baith ("foolish, capricious"), which may originally have conveyed the more positive sense of wildness, recklessness or heroic fury. Another Celtic proposal connects it to Welsh baedd ("boar").

Günter Neumann has argued that the case for Germanic is weaker than for Celtic one because it can't explain the -asio- part of the name. In Gaulish mercasius could mean "marsh", and personal names such as Crippasius, Muccasius, Multasius also show the same form. He also favours the idea that the name is related to the name of the Sicambrian king, Baetorix, which has a Celtic ending meaning "king".

== Location ==
The exact location of their territory is unknown, although they clearly lived near the Cugerni and their capital at Xanten, on the Rhine, because the two peoples lived within the same civitas, with its capital there.

Some scholars believe they lived west of Xanten, between the Maas and the Niers. The area of Gennep, Goch and Geldern have for example been proposed.

Other scholars have located them further south, in the area of Erkelenz and Krefeld, or even further south in Heerlen.

== Attestations ==
In 58-50 BC, the Baetasii were not mentioned by the Roman leader Julius Caesar in his account of his invasion of the region. Instead, the region near the Maas river was inhabited by a group of peoples who he called the "Germani Cisrhenani", or "Germani living on this side of the Rhine". The biggest of these were the Eburones whose country he destroyed, and so it is likely that the later population during the Roman era were to a some extent descended from them. Tacitus, writing in about 100 AD, specifically claimed that the Tungri, who were neighbours of the Baetasii, were the Germani Cisrhenani with a new name.

Some of the Roman era inhabitants of the Rhine region, such as the Ubii and Batavi, were however newcomers, who had moved with the agreement of the Romans, in return for their military service. Modern scholars have also proposed, as they have also for their neighbours the Cugerni, that they descend from the Sicambri, who lived on the opposite side of the Rhine until they were crushingly defeated in 9 BC. This is based on the fact that classical authors reported that the Romans moved large numbers of them into Roman territory somewhere.

In about 70 AD Pliny the Elder placed the Baetasii in a list of the peoples of Gallia Belgica (Belgic Gaul) living between the Seine and the mouth of the Scheldt, and explicitly not counting the coastal peoples or the Germanic people living on the Rhine itself. Before them in the list appear their neighbours the Tungri, Sunici, and Frisiabones and after them a group who lived south of the Ardennes and Eifel—the Leuci,Treveri, Lingones, Remi, and Mediomatrici.

After the rebellion, the Baetasii and neighbouring Cugerni became part of the new Roman colony Colonia Ulpia Traiana in 98-99 AD, where Roman veterans who had become citizens could settle. It had its capital near modern-day Xanten, in the territory of the Cugerni. It was named after Trajan (emperor 98-117).

Writing in about 100 AD, Tacitus mentioned the Baetasii as a people of this region during the Batavian revolt in 69 AD. Unlike the Cugerni, some of them joined Claudius Labeo, who was a Roman loyalist and an opponent of the revolt, and he used them to try to hold a bridge over the river Maas, probably at Maastricht. Together with the Baetasii were Tungri and Nervii, who were peoples who lived west of the Maas. Civilis the rebel leader, sent some of his "Germani" through the river itself, to surround them. He then rushed forward to callout to them, and was able to convince the Tungri, Nervii and Baetasii to join him.

After this rebellion most records of the Baetasii are military in nature, and many of them apparently became Roman citizens.

== Roman military and Baetasii identity ==
The Baetasii are known to have contributed troops to the Roman military, including some who were stationed in Britain. Most of the evidence for this comes from inscriptions.

According to Derks, two inscriptions are from first century AD tombstones. One may have mentioned a Baetasii citizen (civis Baetasius) named Nobilis who was one of emperor Nero's bodyguard. The other described a cavalryman of Baetasii origin (natione Baetesius), buried in Mainz. However, Nobilis is understood by other scholars to be a Batavian (civis Batavus).

In the second century, three Baetasii cavalrymen of the elite Equites singulares Augusti were referred to as "Traianenses Baetasii", which has been taken as evidence that the Baetasii and Cugerni (or Cuberni) by this time lived in a single civitas with its capital near modern Xanten in Colonia Ulpia Traiana, which was named after Trajan (emperor 98-117).

From about 103 AD there was a regular Cohors Baetasiorum—a Roman cohort of Baetasii. This unit was raised from the Baetasii after the revolt of Civilis and sent to Britain with Cerialis. Roman military diplomas have been found in Britain for the years 103, 122, 124 and 135 AD. The unit was stationed at Bar Hill in the time of Antoninus Pius, then at Maryport, probably late second century. Later they were stationed at Old Kilpatrick, perhaps during the reign of Severus. In the third and fourth centuries they were in Reculver on the coast of Kent. They were under the authority of the officer (comes) for the Saxon shore.

Joining the military was eventually a way to become a Roman citizen, and by giving their origins in the early 2nd century CE as "Traianenses Baetasii", it seems they were replacing their exclusive tribal affiliation with a new more Roman identity.

== Religion ==
Votive stones dedicated to the deity Hercules Magusanus were found on the territory of the Baetasii, who was also honoured by the neighbouring Germanic peoples who similarly contributed soldiers to traditionally "Germanic" units in the military, the Cugerni, Batavi, Marsaci, Ubii and Tungri.

== Disappearance ==
Like other peoples in the northern part of Germania Inferior, what happened to them in the later part of the Roman era is uncertain. Some became Roman, or moved. Archaeological and other evidence agrees that in the third and fourth centuries the area was largely de-populated apart from military positions along the Rhine. It later became the home of new groups who crossed the Rhine, and were by that time referred to as the Franks. In the region of the Baetasi the Chattuari were among the groups from across the Rhine who moved into imperial territory and became Franks. If any of the Baetasii remained in the area, they became part of this development.

== Bibliography ==
- Derks, Ton (2009). "Ethnic identity in the Roman frontier. The epigraphy of Batavi and other Lower Rhine tribes". In Derks, Ton; Roymans, Nico (eds.). Ethnic constructs in antiquity: the role of power and tradition (PDF). Amsterdam University Press. ISBN 978-90-8964-078-9.
- Irby-Massie, Georgia L. (1999), "Catalogue of Military Units Stationed in Britain", Military Religion in Roman Britain, Brill, pp. 323–340, doi:10.1163/9789004351226_011
- Jeneson, K.; Vos, W.K. (2020), "Synthesis. The public bathhouse of Coriovallum", Roman bathing in Coriovallum. The thermae of Heerlen revisited, pp. 189–199, ISBN 978-90-5799-324-4
- Geluk, Kees; Gregori, Gian Luca (2020), "The Germani corporis custodes: a "unit in motion"?", in Wolff, Catherine; Faure, Patrice (eds.), Corps du chef et gardes du corps dans l'armée romaine
- Neumann, Günter (1999). "Germani cisrhenani — die Aussage der Namen". In Beck, Heinrich; Geuenich, Dieter; Steuer, Heiko (eds.). Germanenprobleme in heutiger Sicht. Walter de Gruyter. ISBN 978-3110164381.
- Reichert, Hermann (2001), "Linksrheinische Germanen", in Beck, Heinrich; Geuenich, Dieter; Steuer, Heiko (eds.), Reallexikon der Germanischen Altertumskunde, vol. 18 (2 ed.), De Gruyter, pp. 483–494, ISBN 978-3-11-016950-8
- Runde, Ingo (2000), "Kugerner", in Beck, Heinrich; Geuenich, Dieter; Steuer, Heiko (eds.), Reallexikon der Germanischen Altertumskunde, vol. 17 (2 ed.), De Gruyter, pp. 408–410, ISBN 978-3-11-016907-2
- Sergent, Bernard (1991). "Ethnozoonymes indo-européens". Dialogues d'histoire ancienne. 17 (2): 9–55. doi:10.3406/dha.1991.1932.
- von Petrikovits, Harald (1999). "Germani Cisrhenani". In Beck, Heinrich; Geuenich, Dieter; Steuer, Heiko (eds.). Germanenprobleme in heutiger Sicht. Walter de Gruyter. ISBN 978-3110164381.
