= Hercules Magusanus =

Germanic deity

Hercules Magusanus is a Romano-Germanic deity or hero worshipped during the early first millennium AD in the Lower Rhine region among the Batavi, Marsaci, Ubii, Cugerni, Baetasii, and probably among the Tungri.

== Name ==
=== Attestations ===
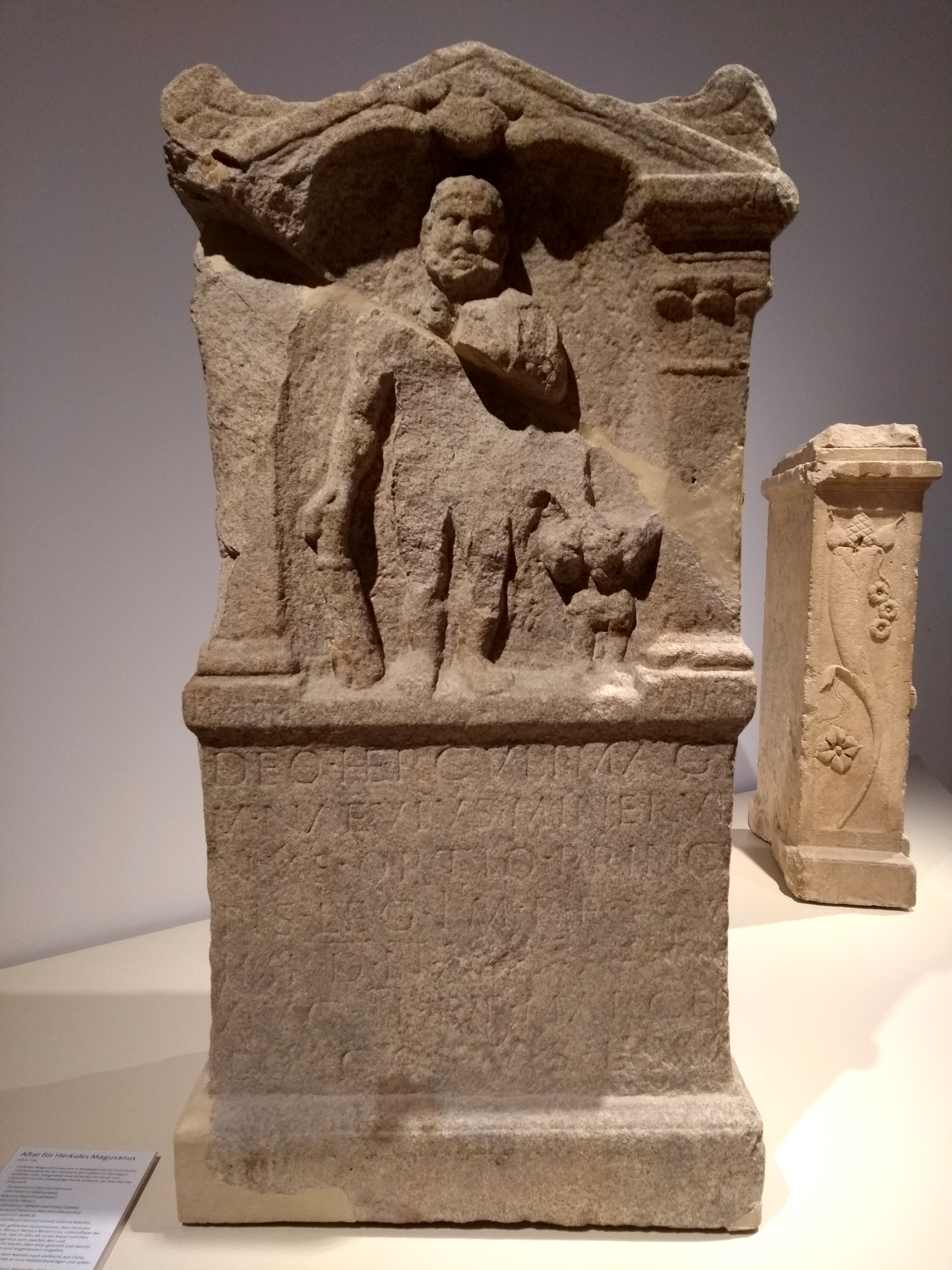
Altar stone for Hercules Magusanus from Bonn, dated 226 AD.

The name is attested on votive stones, coins and arm rings principally found in Lower Germania, but also in Rome, Britain, and Dacia. It appears as Magusen[us] in an inscription dated ca. 100 AD, found near the village of Empel. An altar from Ruimel (mid-1st c. AD), the earliest known which is devoted to Hercules Magusanus, shows the name in reverse order: [M]agusa [n]o Herculi. Additionally, two Roman coins of the Roman Emperor Postumus minted in Cologne in 261 AD, as well as four arm rings from Tongeren, Neuss, Bonn and Cologne also bear his name. In 2022 a new site was discovered in nearby Herwen-Hemeling. It is a sanctuary with a Gallo-Roman temple where most altars were dedicated to Hercules Magusanus.

=== Etymology ===
The name Hercules Magusanus is a syncretism between the Graeco-Roman divine hero Hercules and the local deity or hero Magusanus.

The etymology of the name remains debated. According to Norbert Wagner, it may stem from the Proto-Germanic name *Magus-naz ('the one with strength, the powerful one'; cf. Goth. mahts, German Macht). Rudolf Much has also proposed to compare it with Novio-magus (now Nijmegen), the main settlement of the Batavi, in which the centre of Magusanus' local cult seems to have been located.

In 1984, Léon Fleuriot proposed an alternative connection with the Welsh personal name Mavohe[nos] ('Old Lad', or 'old [one] of the servant''), ultimately from Proto-Celtic *magusenos (magus 'young lad; servant' + senos 'old'). Lauran Toorians notes that, in this view, both Celtic and Germanic etymologies are possible, with the Germanic *magus ('boy, servant') attached to the root *sen- ('old').

== Origin ==
=== Magusanus ===
According to Lauran Toorians, it is probable that the Batavi, who entered the Rhine-Meuse delta from the east after the defeat of the Eburones, were "linguistically mixed, which might mean that they had shifted from Celtic-speaking to Germanic-speaking in recent times." Their elite language was likely Germanic, which led them to Germanicize the names of the region they took over. In this view, the Germanic name Magusanus may have arisen from the original Celtic *Magusenus suggested by Fleuriot.

The earliest dedications to Magusanus are found on Batavian territory and are not attested in the Rhineland region before the 2nd century AD, which may suggest a progressive diffusion of the cult from the Batavi to their neighbours in the east. Since the Roman Hercules was generally equated with the Germanic Donar/Thor via interpretatio romana, Rudolf Simek has suggested that Magusanus was originally an epithet attached to the Proto-Germanic deity *Þunraz.

=== Syncretism with Hercules ===
Several reasons have been proposed to explain the popularity of the Roman hero among Germanic peoples of the Lower Rhine and his syncretism with the local god Magusanus.

A reasonable explanation is that the military and sporting attributes traditionally associated with Hercules, including masculine power and courage, possibly matched those associated with the native Magusanus. This view is supported by the number of votive inscriptions to the god that were dedicated by soldiers, the practice of dropping off weapons in the sanctuary of Hercules Magusanus at Empel, and his role as the patron-deity of the Batavian young warrior bands. A second reason for his success could have been Hercules' role as the keeper of cattle, particularly adapted to the pastoral values of a Lower Rhine society essentially relying on cattle and horse raising. A third argument may be the perception of Hercules as a bridge between the Germanic and Roman cultures, Hercules being seen as the mythical forebear of "barbarian" peoples and the first explorer of the Germanic frontier.

== Cult ==
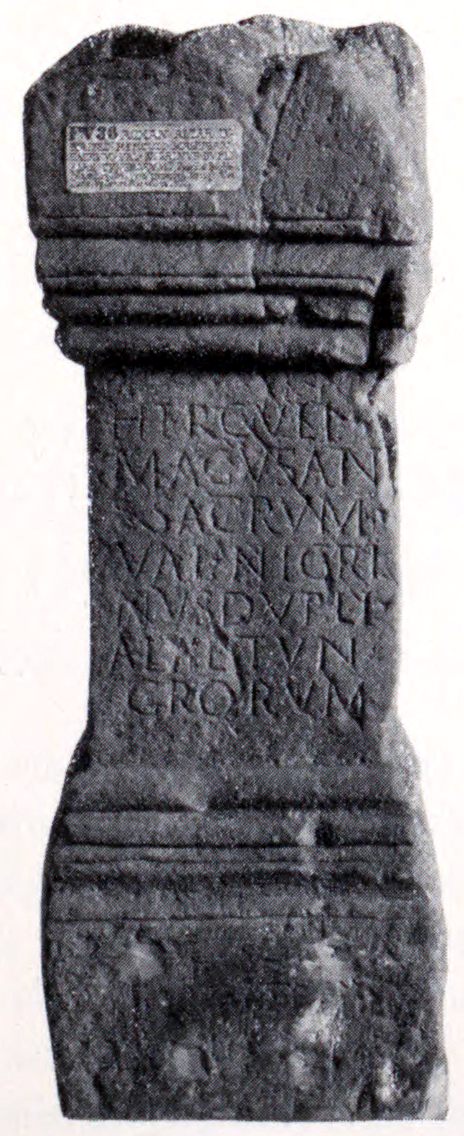
Altar dedicated to Hercules Magusanus found in Scotland, carved ca. 140–165 AD.

=== Batavi ===
As evidenced by the number of votive inscriptions and a cult associated with the monumental temple complex of Empel, Hercules Magusanus was probably the main deity of the Batavian civitas during the Roman period. He may also have played a role as a patron and protector of the Batavian iuventus (koryos), the young male warriors involved as a class age in a public initiation ritual into adulthood.

Nico Roymans argues that the cult of Herculus Magusanus played in a prominent role in the ethnogenesis of the Batavi during the second part of the first century BC.

=== Other Lower Rhine tribes ===
The cult of Hercules Magusanus must have been marginalized as a principal deity in the public cult among the Ubii and the Cugerni following the foundation of the Colonia Claudia Ara Agrippinensium and Colonia Ulpia Traiana in 50–60 AD, when his role was likely taken over by the Roman god Mars.

=== Outside the Lower Rhine ===
Dedications to Hercules Magusanus are also known from Rome, Britain or Dacia. In all instances, they are related to Germani from the Lower Rhine area, most of them serving in the Roman army or to its influence.

An altar to Hercules Magusanus was found near the site of a Roman fort at Mumrills (Stirlingshire), dedicated by Valerius Nigrinus, an officer in the Tungrian cavalry regiment.

== Depiction ==
Although no myth associated with Hercules Magusanus has been preserved, the iconography is rather close to the Latin imagery surrounding Hercules. For instance, several Germanic figurines and statues depict him bearing a club and a lion’s skin over his shoulders, once with three-headed dog Cerberus, echoing foreign myths involving the Roman hero.

== See also ==
- Hercules
- Thor
