= Gal dubsar =

The gal dubsar was a Hittite administrative title literally meaning "chief of the scribes". It is considered to be one of the most important and prestigious posts of the Hittite Empire as the gal dubsar was the head of the government.

== History ==
As the head of the Hittite government the gal dubsar received the most gifts from vassals of the Hittite Kingdom after the king and the crown prince. Sometimes the various gal dubsar would receive the honorific title of the dumu lugal ("Son of the King"), which was bestowed to important members of the government, who weren't related to the royal family.

The gal dubsar had under his jurisdiction all the scribes of the kingdom except for the lugal dubsar, who was the king's personal scribe.

== See also ==
- Gal gestin
- Gal mesedi

== Sources ==
Notes

References

- Bryce, Trevor (2004-12-17). Life and society in the Hittite world. Oxford University Press. ISBN 978-0-19-927588-5.
