= Laeti =

Term used in the late Roman Empire

Laeti (/ˈlɛtaɪ/), the plural form of laetus (/ˈliːtəs/), was a term used in the late Roman Empire to denote communities of barbari ("barbarians"), i.e. foreigners, or people from outside the Empire, permitted to settle on, and granted land in, imperial territory on condition that they provide recruits for the Roman military. The term laetus is of uncertain origin. It means "lucky" or "happy" in Latin, but may derive from a non-Latin word. It may derive from a Germanic word meaning "serf" or "half-free colonist". Other authorities suggest the term was of Celtic or Iranian origin.

== Origin ==
The laeti may have been groups of migrants drawn from the tribes that lived beyond the Empire's borders. These had been in constant contact and intermittent warfare with the Empire since its northern borders were stabilized in the reign of Augustus in the early 1st century. In the West, these tribes were primarily Germans, living beyond the Rhine. There is no mention in the sources of laeti in the Eastern section of the Empire. Literary sources mention laeti only from the late 3rd and 4th centuries.

Although the literary sources mention laeti only from the 4th century onwards, it is likely that their antecedents existed from as early as the 2nd century: the 3rd-century historian Dio Cassius reports that emperor Marcus Aurelius (ruled 161–180) granted land in the border regions of Germania, Pannonia, Moesia and Dacia, and even in Italy itself, to groups of Marcomanni, Quadi and Iazyges tribespeople captured during the Marcomannic Wars (although Marcus Aurelius later expelled those settled in the peninsula after one group mutinied and briefly seized Ravenna, the base of the Adriatic fleet). These settlers may have been the original laeti. Indeed, there is evidence that the practice of settling communities of barbari inside the Empire stretches as far back as the founder-emperor Augustus himself (ruled 42 BC – 14 AD): during his time, a number of subgroups of German tribes from the eastern bank of the Rhine were transferred, at their own request, to the Roman-controlled western bank, e.g. the Cugerni, a subgroup of the Sugambri tribe, and the Ubii. In 69, the emperor Otho is reported to have settled communities of Mauri from North Africa in the province of Hispania Baetica (modern Andalusia, Spain). Given the attestation of several auxiliary regiments with the names of these tribes in the 1st and 2nd centuries, it is likely that their admission to the empire was conditional on some kind of military obligations (Tacitus states that the Ubii were given the task of guarding the West bank of the Rhine) i.e. that they were laeti in all but name.

The name Laeti may have become more widely used after Quintus Aemilius Laetus managed the support of the Danubian Legions for Septimius Severus and eventually took 15 thousand Danubians to the Praetorian Guards in Rome. The Severan dynasty lasted for 42 years, during which Danubians served as Praetorian Guards.

== Organisation ==
The precise constitutions which regulated laeti settlements are obscure. It is possible that their constitutions were standard, or alternatively that the terms varied with each individual settlement. There is also doubt about whether the terms governing laeti were distinct from those applying to gentiles ("natives") or dediticii ("surrendered barbarians") or tributarii (peoples obliged to pay tribute). It is possible that these names were used interchangeably, or at least overlapped considerably. On the other hand, they may refer to juridically distinct types of community, with distinct sets of obligations and privileges for each type. Most likely, the terms laeti and gentiles were interchangeable, as they are listed in the same section of the Notitia Dignitatum, and both referred to voluntary settlements. In addition, the Notitia often places the two terms together, e.g. the praefectus laetorum gentilium Svevorum at Bayeux and the praefectus laetorum gentilium at Reims.

Reproductively self-sufficient groups of laeti (i.e. including women and children) would be granted land (terrae laeticae) to settle in the empire by the imperial government. They appear to have formed distinct military cantons, which probably were outside the normal provincial administration, since the settlements were under the control of a Roman praefectus laetorum (or praefectus gentilium), who were probably military officers, as they reported to the magister peditum praesentalis (commander of the imperial escort army) in Italy. This officer was, in the late 4th/early 5th centuries, the effective supreme commander of the Western Roman army.

In return for their privileges of admission to the empire and land grants, the laeti settlers were under an obligation to supply recruits to the Roman army, presumably in greater proportions than ordinary communities were liable to under the regular conscription of the late empire. The treaty granting a laeti community land might specify a once-and-for-all contribution of recruits. Or a fixed number of recruits required each year. A possible parallel is the treaty with Rome of the Batavi tribe of Germania Inferior in the 1st century. It has been calculated that in the Julio-Claudian era, as many as half of all Batavi males reaching military age were enlisted in the Roman auxilia.

There is considerable dispute about whether recruits from laeti settlements formed their own distinct military units or were simply part of the general pool of army recruits. The traditional view of scholars is that the praefecti laetorum or gentilium mentioned in the Notitia were each in command of a regiment composed of the laeti ascribed to them. Some regiments of laeti certainly existed. The praesentales armies in both East and West contained scholae (elite cavalry units) of gentiles. There is also a mention of a regular regiment called Laeti in the clash between emperors Constantius II and Julian in 361; and a regiment called Felices Laetorum in 6th century Italy. The units ala I Sarmatarum and numerus Hnaufridi attested in 3rd century Britain may have been formed of laeti.

But Elton and Goldsworthy argue that laeti were normally drafted into existing military units, and only rarely formed their own. The main support for this view is a decree of 400 AD in the Codex Theodosianus which authorises a magister militum praesentalis to enlist Alamanni and Sarmatian laeti, together with other groups such as the sons of veterans. This probably implies that laeti were seen as part of the general pool of recruits. In this case, the praefecti laetorum/gentilium may have been purely administrative roles, especially charged with ensuring the full military levy from their cantons each year.

== Notitia Dignitatum ==
Much of our information on laeti is contained in the Notitia Dignitatum, a document drawn up at the turn of the 4th/5th centuries. The document is a list of official posts in the Roman Empire, both civil and military. It must be treated with caution, as many sections are missing or contain gaps, so the Notitia does not account for all posts and commands in existence at the time of compilation. Furthermore, the lists for the two halves of the Empire are separated by as much as 30 years, corresponding to ca. 395 for the Eastern section and ca. 425 for the West. Therefore, not all posts mentioned were in existence at the same time, and not all posts that were in existence are shown.

The surviving Notitia only mentions laeti settlements in Italy and Gaul – and even the two lists of laeti prefects extant are incomplete. But the Notitia suggests that laeti settlements may have existed in the Danubian provinces also. Furthermore, the lists probably contain errors. The list of praefecti laetorum in Gaul contains prefects for the Lingones, Nervii and Batavi: but these tribes had been inside the empire since its inception under Augustus. Thus, their classification as laeti is problematic; most likely the text is corrupt. However, it has been suggested that these names may relate to Roman people displaced from their home areas.

=== List of known laeti settlements ===
Title XLII of the Western part contains two lists of laeti prefects, one for the praefecti laetorum in Gaul, and one for the praefecti gentilium Sarmatarum (prefects of Sarmatian gentiles, i.e. "natives") in Italy and Gaul, all under the command of the magister peditum praesentalis, the commander of the imperial escort army in Italy (despite his title, which means "master of infantry", this officer commanded cavalry as well as infantry units).

==== Praefecti laetorum in Gaul ====
- Batavi and Suevi at Baiocas (Bayeux, Normandy) and Constantia (Coutances, Normandy)
- Suevi at Ceromannos (Le Mans, Maine) and at another, unknown location
- Franks at Redonas (Rennes, Brittany)
- Teutoniciani (Teutones?) at Carnunta (Chartres, Maine)
- Suevi in Arumbernos (Auvergne)
- Lingones dispersed over Belgica I province
- Acti at Epuso, Belgica I
- Nervii at Fanomantis (Famars, Picardy)
- Batavi Nemetacenses at Atrabatis (Arras, Picardy)
- Batavi Contraginnenses at Noviomagus (Nijmegen, Netherlands)
- unspecified gentiles at Remo (Reims, Champagne) and at Silvamectum (Senlis, Picardy)
- Lagenses near Tungri (Tongres, Belgium)
- [substantial section missing]

==== Praefecti gentilium Sarmatarum in Italy ====
- Apulia et Calabria (Apulia and Calabria)
- Bruttii et Lucania (Calabria, Basilicata and Cilento)
- Forum Fulviense
- Opittergum (Oderzo, Friuli)
- Patavium (Padua, Veneto)
- (placename missing)
- Cremona (Cremona, Lombardy)
- Taurini (Turin, Piedmont)
- Aquae sive Tertona (Tortona, Piedmont)
- Novaria (Novara, Piedmont)
- Vercellae (Vercelli, Piedmont)
- Regio Samnites (Sannio, Campania)
- Bononia in Aemilia (Bologna, Emilia-Romagna)
- Quadratae et Eporizium (Verolengo and Ivrea, Piedmont)
- (in Liguria) Pollentia (Pollenzo, Piedmont)

==== Praefecti gentilium Sarmatarum in Gaul ====
- Pictavi (Poitiers, Poitou): N.B. Taifali also mentioned here
- a Chora Parisios usque (Paris region)
- inter Remos et Ambianos Belgica II (Champagne region)
- per tractum Rodunensem et Alaunorum (Rennes area?) : N.B. Alauni were probably also present here
- Lingones (Langres, Champagne)
- Au... (name unintelligible)
- [entire folio – two pages – missing]

=== Marcomanni ===
The Notitia also mentions a tribunus gentis Marcomannorum under the command of the dux Pannoniae et Norici and a tribunus gentis per Raetias deputatae (tribune of natives in the Raetian provinces). These Marcomanni were probably laeti also and may be the descendants of tribespeople settled in the area in the 2nd century by Marcus Aurelius. Alternatively (or additionally), they may have been descended from Germans settled in Pannonia following Gallienus's treaty with King Attalus of the Marcomanni in AD 258 or 259.

The Notitia thus contains 34 entries concerning laeti. But some entries relate to several settlements, not just one, e.g. the Sarmatian settlements in Apulia and Calabria. Furthermore, more than two pages of entries appear to be missing. The number of settlements may thus have been in the hundreds, in the western half of the empire alone.

== Impact ==
The Notitia lists of laeti settlements, incomplete as they are, show their considerable proliferation over the fourth century. This, together with the large numbers of military units with barbarian names, gave rise to the "barbarisation" theory of the fall of the Roman empire. This view ultimately originates from Edward Gibbon's magnum opus, the Decline and Fall of the Roman Empire. According to this view, a critical factor in the disintegration of the western Roman empire in the 5th century was the Romans' ever-increasing reliance on barbarian recruits to man (and lead) their armies, while they themselves became soft and averse to military service. The barbarian recruits had no fundamental loyalty to Rome and repeatedly betrayed Rome's interests. This view does not distinguish between laeti, foederati and mercenaries.

This view has remained in history writing since the more than 200 years since Gibbon wrote his narrative. In recent times the views of Gibbon has been generally discounted. According to Goldsworthy, there is no evidence that barbarian officers or men were any less reliable than their Roman counterparts. Instead, the evidence points to the conclusion that laeti were a crucial source of first-rate recruits to late Roman army. Recruitment of Barbarians was not something new and had been present since the days of the Roman Republic, Julius Caesar and Marc Antony recruited defeated Gallic and German horsemen which served in their campaigns. The practice was taken up by the first emperor Augustus with the establishment of the auxiliaries, incorporating the defeated Barbarians into the Roman army. The Laeti, like the auxiliaries, were set on a path of Romanization.

== See also ==
- Late Roman army
- Saxon shore
