= Chariovalda =

1st century Batavian chieftain

Chariovalda (Proto-Germanic *Harjawalda(z)) was a Batavian chieftain who participated in the Roman retaliation campaign (from 14 to 16 AD) against a Germanic alliance in the aftermath of the disaster at the Battle of the Teutoburg Forest. Chariovalda perished during an engagement with the Cherusci on the further side of the River Weser in 16 AD.
