= Hirdskraa =

Book of medieval Norwegian laws

The Hirdskraa (Hirðskrá), 'The book of the hird', is a collection of laws regulating many aspects of the royal hird of late 13th century Norway. Compiled somewhere in the first part of the 1270s at the order of King Magnus VI (r. 1263-1280), it was recopied widely in the 14th century. The earliest extant texts, the AM 322 fol. and NkS 1642 4to (in the Royal Library, Copenhagen), date to around 1300. AM 322 fol. is thought to have originated at the court of King Magnus' son Håkon V's chancellery in Oslo. In the mid-14th century, with the Norwegian kingdom falling into a personal union with first Sweden and then Denmark, the text was copied less in Scandinavia but remained popular in Iceland, where copies exist from as late as the 18th century. The text can be set beside a number of comparable sections in the Konungs Skuggsjá.

== The Hird ==
The king’s hird (Old Norse hirð, from Old English hired) was more than just a bodyguard and a circle of advisers. Some historians discuss the concept of the corporative hird, where the king functions, at least in theory, as the first among equals at the upper levels of the hird. The hird also formed the professional core of the Norwegian army as maintained by the king.

== Contents ==
The text of Hirdskraa can be more or less conveniently divided into three parts.

1. §§ 1-26. It starts with some background, e.g. on the status of the king, laws of succession, the ranks of men and the manner of appointing men to high office.
2. §§ 27-42. The text widely regulates the activities and customs of the royal hird and includes lengthy prescriptions of modes of address, how men should be admitted to the hird and how the different religious and logistical positions within the hird are to be given out. It discusses the conduct of the military hird in times of war and peace and divides the hird into different levels of status, along with the demands of equipment on the different levels. Three main strata may be distinguished:
  1. the hirðmenn (sg. hirðmaðr) of the royal household proper, who arranged themselves hierarchically. After the chancellor (kanceler), who had risen to prominence in the 13th century, the top layer was formed by landed men (lendir menn), who acted as the king's councillors. From their ranks were recruited the seneschal (dróttseti), butler (skenkjari), staller or marshall (stallari) and standard-bearer (merkismaðr). On a lower level, there were table-servants (skutil-sveinar, lit. 'dish-men'). Some of the names were changed in the reign of Håkon V to more continental titles. After 1277, the landed men (lendir menn) came to be named 'barons' (barúnar) and the skutil-sveinar 'knights' (riddari).
  2. candle-men (kerti-sveinar).
  3. the gestir (lit. 'guests'), men who are from the lower classes that are partly exempt from the hird and function as light infantry, scouts and a sort of secret police.
3. §§ 43-54. The legal status and demands of position on the different levels of the hird are also set down.

== Interpretation ==
The Hirdskraa was probably more of a guide-book than a strictly interpreted law on how the hird was to function. Many of the incorporated concepts, such as the Norwegian jarl being clearly subordinate to the king (as opposed to more of an allied subordinate as the jarls of the islands within the Norwegian realm) do not always reflect historical facts. It must also be regarded as the Norwegian king's attempts to create a more solid administration for their realm in the 13th century. This is especially true of the reign of Håkon V, who, in contrast to his father, seems to have wanted the hird to lose its corporative nature and be put directly under the king.

== Primary sources ==
- Imsen, Steinar (ed. and tr.). Hirðskråen. Hirdloven til Norges konge og hans håndgangne menn. Etter AM322 fol. Oslo: Riksarkivet, 2000. Parallel edition and modern Norwegian (Bokmål) translation. ISBN 82-548-0067-7
- Hirdskraa: i fotolithografisk Gjengivelse efter Tønsbergs Lovbog fra c. 1320. Det norske historiske Kildeskriftfonds skrifter 29. Christiania, 1895.
- Keyser, R. and P.A. Munch (eds.). Norges gamle Love indtil 1387. 5 vols: vol 2. Christiania, 1848. 387-450. Available online from the National Archives of Norway.
- Berge, Lawrence Gerhard (tr.). Hirðskrá 1-37. A Translation with Notes. University of Wisconsin–Madison. 1968. Dissertation, kindly made available online by University of Wisconsin–Madison
- Meißner, R (tr.). Das Norwegische Gefolgschaftsrecht (Hirdskrá). Germanenrechte. Texte und Übersetzungen 5. Weimar, 1938. German translation and introduction.

== Secondary literature ==
- Nordbø, Børge. Hirðsiðir. Om tilhøvet mellom handskrifta av ei morallære frå 1200-talet. Magisteravhandling i norrøn filologi. Oslo, 2004.
- Imsen, Steinar. "King Magnus and his Liegemen’s Hirdskrå: a portrait of the Norwegian nobility in the 1270s." In Nobles and Nobility in Medieval Europe. Concepts, Origins, Transformations, ed. Anne J. Duggan. Woodbridge, 2000. 205-22.
