= Cugerni =

Germanic tribe

The Cugerni (or Cuberni or Gugerni) were a Germanic peoples who lived within the Roman Empire near modern Xanten on the Rhine. Xanten was the seat of a civitas within the Roman province of Germania Inferior (later Germania Secunda) and it became the Colonia Traiana (colony of Trajan). The region was also inhabited by the Baetasii.

== Name ==
Most spelling variants show a g-sound in the middle while a smaller number have a b-sound. Cugerni, was used by Tacitus and in most of the epigraphic record, and Guberni, normally corrected by editors to Cuberni, is attested in Pliny and in a single inscription in Greek, found in Bithynia: Χουβερν[οι]. These variants may have originated from two different spelling traditions, similar to the case of Hübel and Hügel in modern German. On the other hand, [g] and [b] sound similar in the middle of a word, and one of the spellings could simply be a mis-hearing.

The first letter was spelled as a "c" or "g" in Latin but because the Greek spelling used an initial χ (chi), Günter Neumann has proposed that the first letter actually had an h-sound, and that the name meant "inhabitants of the hill tops". Neumann was critical of older proposals which interpreted the first syllable as the Germanic word for a cow, *kubernaz meaning “cow-servant” or “cow-son,” or *ku-gernaz meaning “desiring cows,” and supposedly signifying either “cow-thief” or even “one who commits sodomy with cattle".

== Location ==
The Cugerni had their Roman capital in the area of present day Xanten, on the Rhine, which formed their eastern border.

Concerning the southern boundary of their district, in his account of the Batavian Rebellion of 69 AD, Tacitus mentioned that a Roman force based at Gelduba near Krefeld was within easy striking distance of the districts pagi of the Cugerni. However nearby Neuss was in the civitas of the Ubii, with its capital at Cologne.

To the west of the Cugerni, and apparently within the same civitas administered from Xanten, were the Baetasii. Probably the Niers was the approximate boundary.

To their northwest, inside the empire, were the Batavi in their own civitas, and to their southwest were the Tungri, living in the Civitas Tungrorum.

== Origins ==
The Cugerni were not mentioned in the descriptions of this region left by the Roman general Julius Caesar, who invaded it in 58-50 BC.

Whether their origins were local or not, the population settled a strip of land that had been largely depopulated since Caesar’s campaigns. They may have descended from remnants of the Eburones who Caesar reported destroying in this region.

Alternatively, it has long been speculated that like their neighbours the Batavi and the Ubii, the Cugerni may have been one of the Germanic tribes who came from the other side of the Rhine and were settled in the Roman Empire.

In the early first century, the pottery found near Xanten is most similar to pottery from the area around the mouth of the Lippe river on the opposite bank of the Rhine, where the Sugambri had lived. This archaeological evidence support the hypothesis, that the Cugerni, may have been a part of the Sugambri who several classical authors described as having been resettled by Tiberius in 8 BC. During the first century another region which showed signs of influencing the pottery at Xanten was the Rhine delta where the Batavian and Cananefates were settled.

== History ==
The region of the Cugerni was in the centre of action during the Batavian revolt in 69 AD, with different tribal groups taking different sides. The Cugerni took the side of Gaius Julius Civilis.

After the rebellion, from 98/99 AD the Cugerni and the neighbouring Baetasii became part of the new Roman colony Colonia Ulpia Traiana, where Roman veterans who had become citizens could settle. It had its capital near modern-day Xanten, in the territory of the Cugerni. It was named after Trajan (emperor 98-117).

The population of Germania Inferior reduced significantly in late Roman times, as new waves of Germanic tribes raided, and the Roman empire lost military control. Tribes such as the Chamavi, Chattuarii, and Sallii were eventually allowed to settle semi-independently within Germania Inferior, and were referred to as Franks. They united under kings and then proceeded to conquer a large part of Western Europe. Therefore any surviving Cugerni who stayed in the area were later absorbed into the Frankish kingdom.

== Roman military ==
In approximately the middle of the first century, a cavalry soldier named Melvadius who fought in an auxiliary unit, was described as being a Cugernus by origin.

There was a cohort raised from the Cugerni after the Batavian rebellion, called the Cohors I Ulpia Traiana Cugernorum. It was sent to Britain with Cerialis. Roman military diplomas have been found in Britain for the years 103 and 122 AD, when it gained citizenship and honorific titles, and 124 AD. The unit was at Cramond in 140/44, and possibly in garrison at Carrawburgh, in the late second century. It was Newcastle in the time of Caracalla (emperor 198-217), and after that nothing more is known about this unit.

== Bibliography ==
- Derks, Ton (2009). "Ethnic identity in the Roman frontier. The epigraphy of Batavi and other Lower Rhine tribes". In Derks, Ton; Roymans, Nico (eds.). Ethnic constructs in antiquity: the role of power and tradition (PDF). Amsterdam University Press. ISBN 978-90-8964-078-9.
- Galsterer, Hartmut (2009), "Kolonisation im Rheinland", in Dondin-Payre, Monique; Raepsaet-Charlier, Marie-Thérèse (eds.), Cités, municipes, colonies, Éditions de la Sorbonne, doi:10.4000/books.psorbonne.28166
- Irby-Massie, Georgia L. (1999), "Catalogue of Military Units Stationed in Britain", Military Religion in Roman Britain, Brill, pp. 323–340, doi:10.1163/9789004351226_011
- Neumann, Günter (1984), "Cuberni, Cugerni", in Beck, Heinrich; Geuenich, Dieter; Steuer, Heiko (eds.), Reallexikon der Germanischen Altertumskunde, vol. 5 (2 ed.), De Gruyter, pp. 103–104, ISBN 978-3-11-009635-4
- Neumann, Günter (1999), "Germani cisrhenani — die Aussage der Namen", in Beck, H.; Geuenich, D.; Steuer, H. (eds.), Germanenprobleme in heutiger Sicht, Walter de Gruyter, ISBN 978-3110164381
- Reichert, Hermann (2001), "Linksrheinische Germanen", in Beck, Heinrich; Geuenich, Dieter; Steuer, Heiko (eds.), Reallexikon der Germanischen Altertumskunde, vol. 18 (2 ed.), De Gruyter, pp. 483–494, ISBN 978-3-11-016950-8
- Runde, Ingo (2000), "Kugerner", in Beck, Heinrich; Geuenich, Dieter; Steuer, Heiko (eds.), Reallexikon der Germanischen Altertumskunde, vol. 17 (2 ed.), De Gruyter, pp. 408–410, ISBN 978-3-11-016907-2
- von Petrikovits, Harald (1999). "Germani Cisrhenani". In Beck, Heinrich; Geuenich, Dieter; Steuer, Heiko (eds.). Germanenprobleme in heutiger Sicht. Walter de Gruyter. ISBN 978-3110164381.
