= Comitatus (warband) =

Germanic warband

In history writing, a comitatus, which is Latin for a group of companions (comites), is an armed escort or retinue, especially in the context of Germanic warrior culture, where warbands were tied to a leader by an oath of fealty. The concept describes the relations between a lord and his retainers. Traditionally, scholars have seen such Germanic warbands as the origin of later medieval European institutions involving nobles and their armed retainers. On the other hand, many scholars today consider the Roman era report of these warbands as more of a literary trope.

Scholars Bruce Mitchell and Fred C. Robinson describe the comitatus more fully:

A heroic warrior brought up in this [comitatus] tradition would show a reckless disregard for his life. Whether he was doomed or not, courage was best, for the brave man could win lof [glory among men] while the coward might die before his time. This is the spirit which inspired the code of the comitatus. While his lord lived, the warrior owed him loyalty unto death. If his lord were killed, the warrior had to avenge him or die in the attempt. The lord in his turn had the duty of being generous to his warriors. He had to be the great fighter to attract men, a man of noble character and a generous giver of feasts and treasure to hold them.

The comitatus ideal is seen in Old English heroic literature, such as The Battle of Maldon, Beowulf, The Battle of Brunanburh, The Battle of Finnsburh, and the story of "Cynewulf and Cyneheard." The comitatus is also examined through a Christian context in works such as Dream of the Rood, where Christ is depicted more as a warrior-king doing battle with the Devil and accepts physical defeat for spiritual victory. The rood, or cross, in the poem acts as a retainer "who is forced by his very loyalty to become the instrument of his beloved Lord's execution."

In late Roman and early medieval times, the Latin word comitatus referred to an office or jurisdiction held by a comes or count. In later medieval and modern times, "comitatus" became the Latin term for a geographical region or county where the jurisdiction of the count was effective.

Posse comitatus ("power/force of the county"; comitatus is 4th declension so the genitive termination is ūs), usually shortened to posse, is a group of people helping a sheriff or other official representing the county to enforce the law.

== Origins ==
The term comitatus is credited to the Roman historian Tacitus. In his treatise Germania (98 AD), the comitatus is defined as a retinue of warriors who follow a lord (princeps). Tacitus used the terms comes (follower) and comitatus (following) a small number of times in passages in his work:

chapter 12: In these same councils, leaders are also chosen who administer justice throughout the districts and villages; each one has a group of one hundred companions (comites) from among the common people, who provide both counsel and authority. [...]
chapter 13: Distinguished nobility or great merit of his forefathers can secure a young man a place among the leaders even in his youth, while the others join a following once they have proven themselves strong and reliable. Nor is it considered shameful among the companions [comites] to be seen in such a role. Indeed, there is even a hierarchy within the retinue [comitatus], determined by the judgment of the leader whom they follow; there is intense rivalry among the followers [comitum] for the highest position with their leader, just as there is among the leaders themselves, who strive to have the largest number and most valiant companions [comites]. This is their honor, this is their power: to be surrounded by a large group of chosen youths is a glory in peace and a protection in war. And this fame is not only held within their own community but also among neighboring states; if one stands out with a large and courageous following [comitatus], they are sought out in embassies and honored with gifts, and they often bring wars to an end by the mere weight of their reputation. [...]
chapter 14: When they come into battle, it is a disgrace for the leader to be outdone in courage, and a disgrace for the followers [comitatui] not to match the courage of their leader. Indeed, it is considered a lifelong disgrace and dishonor for any follower to leave the battlefield alive after his leader has fallen: to defend and protect him, and to attribute their own brave deeds to his glory, is their most solemn duty. Leaders fight for victory, while followers [comites] fight for their leader. If the community where they were born is languishing in prolonged peace and inactivity, many young nobles willingly seek out other nations engaged in war, as peace is unwelcome to their people and they find it easier to gain renown amid dangers. A large following [comitatum], moreover, can only be maintained by force and in war. [...]

Tacitus stressed the abnegation of the follower, and his dependence on his patron, whose prestige rested on his ability to successfully wage war, and thus provide a military training for his followers. Loyalty was met by material reward.

Regarding the armor and weapons of late first century Germanic warriors, Tacitus explains that few carried long lances or swords. More commonly, Germanic warriors bore frameae, or sharp spears with short, narrow blades that could be used in close quarters or in long-range fighting. Warriors who fought on horseback carried a shield and spear, and foot-soldiers often used javelins. Warriors, according to Tacitus, often fought naked or "lightly clad in short cloaks." Few warriors wore breastplates or helmets; however, any helmets worn were made out of animal hide or metal. A shield may bear the colors of a warrior's choice. Throwing away one's shield in the battlefield, or fleeing from battle, was considered a disgrace that could cause a warrior to be banned from attending assemblies and religious rituals and sacrifices.

Tacitus describes the battle tactics of Germanic warriors, claiming that the strength of Germanic warriors was in their infantry rather than their cavalry, the horses of the Germans not being overly beautiful or fast and foot-soldiers having the speed to keep up with the cavalry. The best warriors were placed at the main battle-line along with the cavalry. Tacitus further explains the battle practices of Germanic warriors, "The battle-line is made up of wedge-shaped formations. To give ground, provided that you return to the attack, is considered good tactics rather than cowardice. They [Germanic warriors] bring back the bodies of the fallen even when a battle hangs in the balance."

The comitatus has also been seen as an Indo-European concept that predates Roman times, practiced from Western Europe to China, especially among Eurasian steppe tribes.

== Fostering & kin ==
In early medieval England, a lord may foster the children and relatives of allied chiefdoms, which involved sending one's sons to the court of another kinsman or lord. The son(s) would then grow up with other boys similar to their age and be taught the art of warfare. They would reside at the court from the age of seven or eight until they turned fourteen or fifteen. At the age of fourteen or fifteen, they would be granted weapons that were appropriate to their status and would serve militarily in the comitatus. Fostering helped to create loyalty among chiefdoms, often because a lord was fostering his sons at other courts or because the boys he had fostered had grown up and become lords themselves. A lord's family also often comprised large portions of a lord's warband.

A retainer's relationship to his lord was also supposed to be placed above his ties to his kin. For example, in the story of "Cynewulf and Cyneheard," the comitatus was shown to be more important than ties to kinship for the members of the warrior class, warriors choosing to remain loyal to their lords even if this decision meant killing some of their own kinsmen who were on the enemy's side.

== Feudal developments ==
Comitatus, being the agreement between a Germanic lord and his subservients (his Gefolge or host of followers), is a special case of clientage, and related to the practice of feudalism. Partly influenced by the Roman practice of patronage (patrocinium), - as exemplified by the lex agraria, of a general distributing land to his officers after their retirement, as well as by the later bucellarius or private follower – the Germanic comitatus eventually evolved into a wholesale exchange between a social superior and inferior. The feudal social inferior or vassal would pledge military service and protection to the superior (Lord). In return, the superior would reward the inferior with land, compensation, or privileges.

== Nomenclature ==
The Germanic term for the comitatus is reconstructed as *druhtiz, with Old English forms dryht and druht, and Scandinavian drótt. Equivalents highlighting different features of the lord/man bond include the trust-element of the early Frankish antrustio, royal bodyguard; the Danish vederlag or Society, and the Norse hird or household following.

== Women ==
The Wife's Lament in the Exeter Book uses the language of the comitatus to sharpen awareness of the conflict between the wife's claim on her lover, and the brotherhood-claims of the lord and his followers: In the words of the Wife's Lament, "that man's kinsmen began to think in secret that they would separate us." How typical this is of the medieval genre of the frauenlied – with the romantic theme of a woman being left by her husband because he needs to be with his liege lord – is however debatable. Even in Anglo-Saxon England, if the Exeter Book contains few pieces featuring women or written from the female perspective, Beowulf by contrast has roles for women precisely in strengthening the cohesion and unity of the comitatus: thus the 'peace-weaver' (a woman given in marriage to resolve a feud) Queen Wealtheow makes the normative claim that “Here each comrade is true to the other/loyal to lord, loving in spirit./The thanes have one purpose, the people are ready:/having drunk and pledged, the ranks do as I bid.”.

Tacitus finds that women helped late first century Germanic warriors fight their battles. According to Tacitus, warbands were frequently composed of men of one family or clan and kept near to them their women and children during battles. Mothers and wives of warriors treated wounds and compared the war injuries of their men to other warriors. Women also gave encouragement and food to warriors in battle. If Germanic combatants were losing a battle, Tacitus claims that women aided the cause by "thrusting forward their bare bosoms, and making them [the Germanic warriors] realize the imminent prospect of enslavement – a fate which the Germans feared more desperately for their women than for themselves." Women were also believed by Germans to hold within them "an element of holiness and a gift of prophecy; and so they [Germanic warriors] do not scorn to ask for their [women's] advice, or lightly disregard their replies."

== Challenges to the historical accuracy of the comitatus ==
Tacitus supplies much of what scholars believe to know about the customs of Germanic tribes, the ancestors of the Anglo-Saxons, before they came to Britain during the fifth century and converted to Christianity. However, Tacitus's Germania must be viewed critically because his descriptions of the Germans were partly used to criticize what he viewed was the corruption and softness of the Roman empire around 100 A.D.

In addition, much of Tacitus's information is not first hand knowledge but information he collected from others. Much of the evidence supporting the comitatus occurs centuries after the writings of Tacitus and are presented through oral heroic poetry. As a result, the comitatus is generally viewed more by scholars as a literary ideal rather than a historical reality. Regarding sources that support the comitatus, Stephen Morillo claims, "Few topics in early medieval history are as obscure as the comitatus, or warband, perhaps the basic social and military unit of organization among the post-Roman ruling classes. Because the warband members were almost all illiterate, their world must come to us either through heroic oral poetry (often not recorded until long after the period in which the oral tradition thrived) or through hostile clerical chroniclers with little sympathy for warband values." Stephen S. Evans, who examines the comitatus in England during the period between the fifth and eighth centuries, admits, "Given the dearth of sources for this period as well as the differing rates of development of the various kingdoms, it is impossible to determine the precise degree to which the image of the comitatus manifested itself in the historical record at any given time or place." Although Tacitus's work describes Germania in the late first century, there is also no guarantee that Germanic societies were the same when they arrived to England in the fifth century.

== See also ==
- Anglo-Saxon military organization
- Comitatus (Kingdom of Hungary)
- Gesith
- Huskarl
- Druzhina
- Varangian Guard
- German Guard
- Leidang
- Fyrd
- Thingmen
- Secret society
