= Germanisation of Gaul =

Spread of German people in Gaul

Germanisation is the spread of the German people, customs and institutions. The penetration of Germanic elements in the Gaul region began from the twilight of the Iron Age through migration of Germanic peoples like the Suebi and the Batavi across the Rhine into Julius Caesar's Roman Gaul. Further, one of the earliest permanent settlements of a group of Germans namely the Visigoths on Roman soil was in the post-classical period, which opened the door for various other Germanic peoples to enter Rome's Gallic provinces through the Great Rhine Crossing during the Middle Ages and spread Germanic elements further. The prevalence of various records of archaeological and written evidence regarding the spread of different Germanic elements such as German burials, pottery, costumes, houses mainly between the 3rd and the 5th centuries AD in Gaul depicts the full force of the Germanisation process that took place in Gaul.

== Early Germanic influences and migrations in the Iron Age ==
The vast amount of archaeological and written evidence that depicts the spread of 'Germanic' elements and influences in Gaul during the end of the Iron Age presents the fact that Germanisation in Gaul and regions situated east to it began much earlier than the Middle Ages. These various sources have agreed that Germanic peoples were in control and had relative influence over Gaul, particularly Hesse during the time of Julius Caesar's campaigns, highlighting the successful migration of these Germanic peoples as well as the added layer of control that they had earned. Burials such as those of Muschenheim or settlements like Hanau-Mittelbuchen authenticate the gradual Germanisation process that took place in Gaul. German scholars have two different chains of opinions regarding the true nature of the spread of Germanic peoples and their influences initially. One chain of thought supports migration to be the most credible premise and that their arrival led to the decline of Roman rule and a rise in Germanic influence. The other chain of thought supports that there was anyway a decline in Roman rule and that their migration merely took advantage of the poor governance so as to increase their influence. The migration that occurred can be attested to Suebian king Ariovistus's fourteen years campaign that resulted in the migration and settlement of vast numbers of Germanic peoples that had established themselves in Gaul and on the banks of the river Rhine. The Treveran lands were also majorly influenced by not only German troops, but also individual Germanic peoples which is evidenced by the burials in Wederath that included belt buckles which have been identified as of German origin.

=== Batavians in Gaul ===
The Batavi were one of the initial tribes to settle in Gaul specifically in the Rhine-Meuse delta region which has been evidenced by numismatic evidence that was found as coins can be traced back to the Chatti tribe who consisted of the Batavi specifically the silver triquetrum coins. The migration of the Batavi occurred somewhere between 50-40 BC, which was after the Gallic Wars. The coinage evidence further positions that the Batavi were a combination of the Eburones who were victims of corrective action led by Julius Caesar in 53 and 51 BC and that the immigration from the central Rhine region caused a mixing of various populations, hence creating the Batavi as a new tribal group. The Ethnogenesis of the Batavi into Gaul is reflected by the circulation and production of the triquetrum coinages shortly after the Gallic Wars that evidences the hypothesis that the mass migration of Germanic peoples was rooted in Caesarian frontier policy. The coins were a major source of influence for the Germanic peoples as they were probably used to forge and combine clientship networks, as well as other process that integrated Gaul into a new Batavian society. Another form of Germanic influence was through a Batavian 'foedus' that satisfied Rome's concern of having a reliable ally to guard the northern Gallic frontier. This foedus ensured that the Batavians were excused from paying tribute and needed only to support troops, increasing their influence and power.

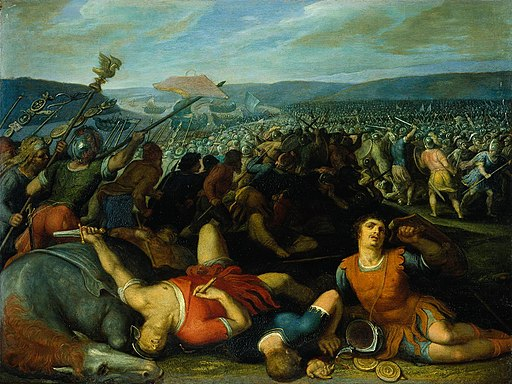
Batavians defeating Romans on the Rhine by Otto van Veen as part of a series of 12 painting depicting the Batavian revolt

== Germanisation during the post-classical history period and Middle Ages ==
Towards the end of the post-classical history period and the onset of the Middle Ages, there were various invasions, which led to the settlement of a large and collective body of Germans in Roman Gaul. One of the earliest invasions of the Roman Empire was conducted by the Visigoths, that were a major group of Germanic peoples. However, this invasion was very far from affecting the Romans who held on strong until the year 9 AD when the Romans were defeated and Germanisation seemed imminent as the Romans were pushed into defence against various Germanic peoples who were impatient to push the boundary and enter Roman territory. Many scholars agree that if there had not been a sudden and alarming influx of populations from the Germanic peoples into Gaul and other regions, the Roman Empire might have collapsed completely much earlier than it actually did.

=== Great Rhine crossing ===
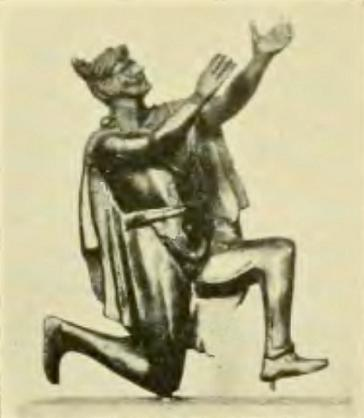
Roman bronze figurine, which depicts a praying German and a characteristic Suebian knot

The entrance of the Visigoths on Roman soil did indeed open the door for other Germanic peoples to pick apart the rest of the empire. In 406/7 AD, a large scale invasion of Gaul was carried out by various groups such as the Suebi, Silingi, Alans. This process has been labelled as the "Great Rhine Crossing" which was a great success and laid effective damage to the regions of Gaul. While the Visigoths were in Gallia Aquitania following their successful campaign in bringing Spain under their control, the Great Rhine Crossing had ensured the dissolution of the Rhine frontier and the Germanic peoples were all across the Empire, hence integrating themselves in various parts of the Roman empire to increase their power and influence.

== Archaeological evidence of Germanisation ==
The gradual spread of Germanic peoples and Germanic elements into Rome's Gaul region is a well documented process that commenced in the 3rd century AD and ended in the 5th century AD The prevalence of various Germanic male burials that contain weapons and female burials that contain Germanic costumes that were found in Gaul support the spread of Germanic elements. Even, Germanic settlements excavated in Gaul depict similarities to the longhouse of the Wohnstallhaus type, which is a typical Germanic style of housing as well as Germanic pottery vessels that were found all across Gaul. Germanic peoples in Gaul lived in communities that were built by Germanic buildings, Germanic pottery and traditional burial rituals which clearly highlighted that they were not bothered with changing the culture they found, but rather merging into the existing condition.

== See also ==
- List of French words of Germanic origin
- Germanisation of Poles during the Partitions – German cultural policy in partitioned Poland (1815–1919)
- Germanisation in Poland (1939–1945) – German led genocide of Jews in Poland (1939-1945)
