= Gal mesedi =

Hittite Kingdom

The gal mesedi was a Hittite military and administrative title literally meaning "chief of the royal bodyguards". He was in charge of the Mesedi, the personal bodyguard of the Hittite king. It is considered to be one of the most important and prestigious posts of the Hittite Kingdom.

== History ==
The gal mesedi was a commander responsible for the safety of the king himself. On most cases he was a member of the royal family and sometimes the brother of the king, whom he sometimes succeeded as in the case of Hattusili III, who before becoming a king was the gal mesedi of his brother, King Muwatalli II. A gal mesedi could also at times command independent military units that weren't under the king's jurisdiction.

== See also ==
- Gal dubsar
- Gal gestin

== Sources ==
Notes

References

- Bryce, Trevor (2004-12-17). Life and society in the Hittite world. Oxford University Press. ISBN 978-0-19-927588-5.
- Beal, Richard Henry (1992). The organisation of the Hittite military. C. Winter. ISBN 978-3-533-04562-5.
- Burney, Charles (19 April 2004). Historical Dictionary of the Hittites. Scarecrow Press. ISBN 0810865645.
