= Gal gestin =

Hittite military and administrative title

The gal gestin was a Hittite military and administrative title literally meaning "chief of the wine stewards". It is considered to be one of the most important and prestigious posts of the Hittite Kingdom.

== History ==
As a gal gestin a commander was personally responsible for the safety of the king. In most cases he was a member of the royal family and usually the brother of the king.

A gal gestin would at times also participate in festivals, while like the gal mesedi he could command troops independent from the monarch's jurisdiction.

== Sources ==
Notes

References

- Bryce, Trevor (2004-12-17). Life and society in the Hittite world. Oxford University Press. ISBN 978-0-19-927588-5.
- Beal, Richard Henry (1992). The organisation of the Hittite military. C. Winter. ISBN 978-3-533-04562-5.
