= Michael P. Speidel =

German-born American military historian and archaeologist

- Born: May 25, 1937; Pforzheim, Germany
- Education: University of Freiburg
- Scientific career
- Fields: Military historian
- Institutions: University of Hawaii at Manoa

Michael Paul Speidel (born May 25, 1937) is a German-born American military historian and archaeologist who specializes in the study of the Roman army and ancient warfare. He is considered one of the world's foremost experts on ancient warfare.

== Biography ==
Michael Paul Speidel was born in Pforzheim, Germany on May 25, 1937. His nephew Michael Alexander Speidel is also a historian.

Speidel received his Ph.D. in ancient history from the University of Freiburg in 1962. His Ph.D. thesis was on the Emperor's Guard. He then went to the United States to lecture ancient history. In 1968 Speidel became Associate Professor at the University of Hawaii at Manoa. He has since been promoted to Full Professor at the university, where he teaches the history of Ancient Greece, Ancient Rome, the ancient Near East, the Spanish Empire, the Portuguese Empire, and world cultures. Now Professor Emeritus, he is a member of the German Archaeological Institute.

Speidel specializes in the study of the Roman army, particularly its epigraphy, on which he has written a number of books. In recent years, Speidel has conducted extensive archaeological research on the warfare of ancient Eurasia and ancient Germanic mythology. He is considered one of the world's foremost experts on ancient warfare.

== Selected works ==
=== Books ===
- Die Equites singulares Augusti, 1965
- Guards of the Roman Armies, 1978. ISBN 9783774914285
- The Religion of Iuppiter Dolichenus in the Roman Army, E. J. Brill, 1978. ISBN 9789004053984
- Mithras-Orion: Greek Hero and Roman Army God, 1980. ISBN 9789004060555
- Iuppiter Dolichenus, 1980.
- Roman Army Studies, Vol. 1 (Mavors Roman Army Researches, Vol. I), J.C. Gieben, 1984. ISBN 9789070265755
- Roman Army Studies, Vol. 2 (Mavors Roman Army Researches, Vol. VIII), F. Steiner, 1992. ISBN 9783515061261
- The Framework of an Imperial Legion: The Fifth Annual Caerleon Lecture in Honorem Aquilae Legionis II Augustae, National Museum of Wales, 1992. ISBN 9780720003611
- Commodus the God-Emperor and the Army, 1993.
- Die Denkmäler der Kaiserreiter: Equites singulares Augusti, 1994.
- Riding for Caesar: The Roman Emperors’ Horse Guards, 1994. ISBN 9780674768970
- Ancient Germanic Warriors: Warrior Styles from Trajan’s Column to Icelandic Sagas, 2004.
- Emperor Hadrian’s speeches to the African Army: A New Text, 2007. ISBN 9783884670972
- Dawn of Japan: Emperor Jimmu with his Gods and Warriors on Third-Century Bronze Mirrors (co-author Tomoko Fukushima), Reichert Verlag, 2010. ISBN 9783895008016
