= Civilis =

Civilis may refer to:

- Gaius Julius Civilis, the leader of the Batavian rebellion against the Romans in 69
- Tiberius Claudius Civilis
- Civilis (vicarius), a vicarius of Roman Britain in 368
- Raimundas Čivilis, a former Lithuanian basketball player
