= Thingmen =

Standing army in the service of the Kings of England, 1013–1051

The Thingmen (Old English: Þingalið) was a unit (or a body of men) in the service of the Kings of England during the period 1013–1051. The unit was financed by direct taxation which had its origins in the tribute known as Danegeld. It consisted mostly of men of Scandinavian descent and it had an initial strength of 3,000 housecarls and a fleet of 40 ships, which was subsequently reduced. The last remnant of a Thingmen was disbanded by Edward the Confessor in 1051.

In the 11th century, three courts outside Scandinavia were particularly prominent in recruiting Scandinavian troops: Novgorod-Kiev (Kievan Rus') c. 980–1060, Constantinople (the Varangian Guard) 988–1204, and England 1018–1051. Scandinavia was however also a recruiting area for attacks against England and this is why a defence needed to be organized by the Danish king Cnut the Great. The Thingmen attracted Swedish mercenaries, and probably some Norwegian as well.

== History ==
=== Formation and structure ===
In 1012 King Æthelred the Unready of England ended several years of devastating attacks by a Danish army led by Thorkell the Tall by making a huge payment of Danegeld. Most of the raiders dispersed, but Thorkell himself entered English service with 45 ships and their crews. This force, based at Greenwich, was paid with money collected through the tax system established to raise Danegeld. They remained loyal to Æthelred during the Danish invasion led by King Swein Forkbeard in 1013, which eventually drove Æthelred to flee the country.

When Æthelred was restored to power in England in 1014, after the death of Swein, he retained or regained the services of Thorkell and his men, who continued to receive large sums of money. However, in 1015 Thorkell, accompanied by 9 ships, joined the fresh invasion of England being prepared by Swein's son Cnut.

According to a later saga tradition this defection was due to the massacre of a separate force of Danish troops brought to England by Swein and commanded by Thorkell's brother Hemming. The chronicle of Florence of Worcester claims that the 40 ships which deserted Æthelred to join Cnut's invasion force after its arrival in England, under the leadership of Ealdorman Eadric Streona of Mercia, were manned by Danish crews. If so, these may have been the residue of Thorkell's former followers who had remained in Æthelred's service when their leader left.

While the upheavals of 1015 thus ended, this experiment of keeping a standing, tax-funded force of Scandinavian mercenaries in England set a precedent which was followed by Cnut after his conquest of England, completed in 1016. Most of his invasion army was dismissed and returned home, but 40 ships and their crews were retained in the king's service.

The 12th-century Danish chronicler Sven Aggesen told a story of how these men were selected. According to this tale, Cnut had attracted a large number of men and many had not had the opportunity to distinguish themselves in battle. Consequently, he decided to select those that were the most prominent in origin or wealth in order to form a royal bodyguard. Therefore, he had a herald proclaim that only those who had especially valuable weapons would have the distinction of counting themselves among the king's housecarls. After this proclamation, those who were less affluent retired while the successful warriors, who had gathered considerable amounts of spoils of war, used their wealth to embellish their weaponry with gold and silver. He selected 3,000 men who were thenceforth the Thingmen.

The Thingmen had their own laws, which enforced quality within the unit, even going so far as to make the men equal to the king.

=== Later development and dissolution ===
Under Cnut, the system of direct taxation in silver, based on an assessment of land value, which had been used as an occasional expedient by Æthelred to raise individual lump sums of Danegeld, became a regular annual form of levy to support this standing force, a payment now known as heregeld (army-tax). Each man was paid 8 marks of silver, 12 marks for the helmsman who commanded each ship. As the new Danish dynasty consolidated its position, the number of troops employed was considerably diminished. By the reign of Cnut's son Harold Harefoot, who came to power in 1035, only 16 ships were kept in service.

Harold's half-brother Harthacnut, who succeeded him in 1040 and arrived with a fleet from Denmark, dramatically increased the tax burden to pay for 60 or 62 ships in the first year of his rule in England, but reduced this force to 32 ships in 1041. This tax increase provoked violent unrest.

Under Edward the Confessor, who came to the throne in 1042, the standing force was further reduced and by 1050 he was employing only 14 ships. In that year 9 of these were dismissed and in 1051 the remaining force was disbanded and the heregeld was abolished.

== Runestones ==
Several of its members are commemorated on runestones, such as the Viking Runestones and the England Runestones. One example is the Komstad Runestone which was raised in memory of the marshall Vrái, who had served in England with his brother Gunni, something that Vrái reported himself on the Sävsjö Runestone.

Other examples are the Kålsta Runestone, where two sons report that their father was a member of the Assembly Retinue, and the Gåsinge Runestone which was raised in memory of a warrior who served Cnut.

== See also ==
- Huskarl
- Druzhina
- Hird
- Comitatus
- Varangian Guard
- German Guard
- Leidang
