= Cerialis =

Cerialis or Cerealis is a Latin term which means "of Ceres", "pertaining to Ceres", and may refer to:

- Neratius Cerealis (fl. 328–358), Roman senator and politician, praefectus urbi and consul
- Quintus Petillius Cerialis (c. AD 30–after AD 83), Roman general and governor of Britain
- Sextus Vettulenus Cerialis (fl. 67–83/84), Roman consul, governor and legate
