= Batavi (Germanic tribe) =

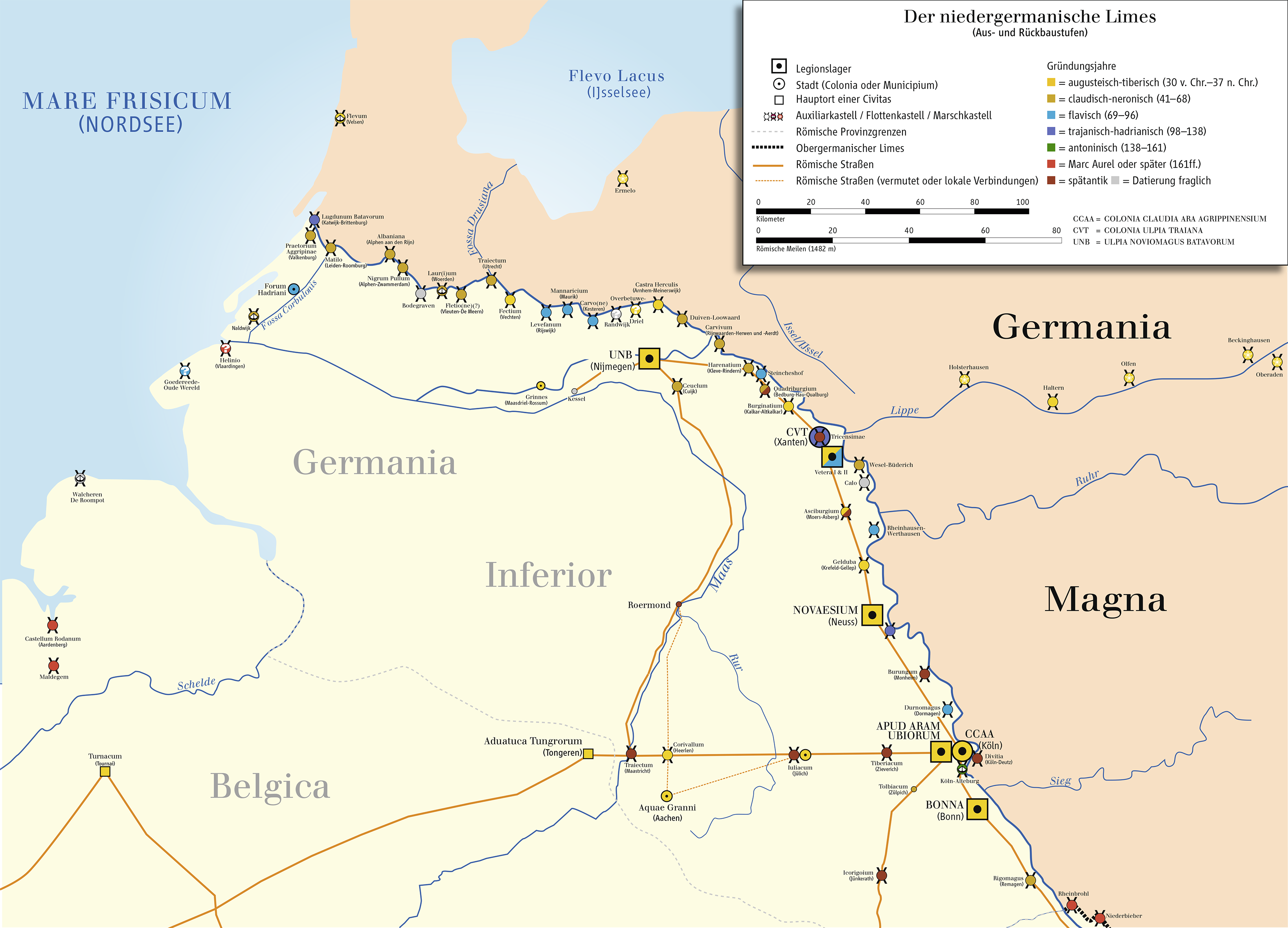
The Roman border along the Lower Rhine

The Batavians or Batavi were a Roman-era Germanic people that lived in Batavia in the eastern Rhine delta — an area that is now in the Netherlands, but then lay upon the northernmost border of the Roman Empire in continental Europe. The Roman author Tacitus indicated that they originated as a group of Rome-allied Chatti, who settled in Batavia around 50–15 BC. Archaeological evidence shows that they joined a Celtic-influenced community that had already been living there long before the arrival of the Romans. Throughout the several centuries in which they appear in historical records the Batavians were continually associated with elite cavalry units in the Roman military, who were famous for their ability to cross rivers while armed and on horseback, without breaking line.

Batavia was already referred to by the Roman leader Julius Caesar as the "Island of the Batavi" (Latin: Insula Batavorum) in his account of his campaigns in Gaul in 58–52 BC — although he did not explain who the Batavi were. Tacitus, writing in about 100 AD, reported that they had a special old alliance (antiquae societatis) with the empire as major contributors to the Roman military, and they did not pay any other form of tribute or tax. Some modern scholars have suggested that this relationship was established by Caesar himself who had a Germanic cavalry unit which fought for him in Gaul, and then in his Roman civil war. According to these proposals, this force evolved into the later bodyguard of Caesar's imperial successors in the Julio-Claudian dynasty, who continued to recruit Batavians for this role.

Apart from the bodyguard, the Batavi in the first century AD provided 9 or 10 auxiliary cohorts which each included cavalry, all with their own Batavian command structures. Based upon estimates of the Batavian population at about 40,000 people, of whom 5000 or more were posted in the Roman military, historians believe the Batavi had a highly militarized society, even if they were able to recruit from neighbouring populations. While at least one cohort stayed close to home, eight played an important role in the Roman subjugation of Britain. In 69 AD, the "Year of the Four Emperors", Julius Civilis, a Batavi leader and Roman citizen, led the Batavian Revolt during a period when several Roman leaders were fighting for control of the empire. The revolt involved not only the Batavi and their neighbours the Cananefates, but also allies from both inside and outside Roman Gaul. Vitellius, a Roman governor of their region who was contending to become emperor, was their main enemy at first, and was defeated. However, the Batavi were themselves eventually forced to come to an agreement with the victorius new emperor, Vespasian.

After this revolt, the Batavian forces were once again posted in Britain, but in the second century Batavian forces began to be assigned to the Danubian frontier. In the second and third centuries the "Batavian" military units recruited in the provinces where they were based, and gradually became less ethnically Batavian. Networks of military families, many now Roman citizens, continued to identify as Batavi into the second century, but often while living outside of their home region. Although their name survived in the names of Roman military units and the Roman military base at Passau (Latin: Batavis), the Batavians themselves disappeared from the historical record during the Crisis of the Third Century, when Rome lost control of Batavia to tribes from north of the Rhine including Frisii and Chamavi. The people there were also referred to now for the first time as Franks. The main Batavian Roman settlement at Nijmegen was abandoned by 250 AD. When the Romans recovered partial control of the region generations later, they moved large parts of the native population to other parts of the empire. In the 4th century, the Salian Franks from north of the Rhine were allowed to remain in the area by the Romans and from this point on the Batavian region was Frankish.

== Name and language ==
There is little evidence concerning the language of the Roman era Batavi, but a significant number of their personal names have Germanic etymologies, while a smaller number are Celtic. Scholars believe that although, like the Chatti, the Batavi had a Celtic-influenced background, "at the very least" they were "early drawn into the process of Germanization" which was happening near the Rhine.

Scholars have traditionally given the regional name "Batavia" a Germanic etymology, *bat-awjō. The first part is reconstructed as the stem of a word *bataz meaning "beneficial", which is reflected for example in modern English "best" or "better". The second reconstructed element would refer to floodplains, meadows, and islands, and derive ultimately from the Indo-European word for water, *h₂ékʷeh₂, reflected in Latin aqua. The name would therefore means something like "good island". However, this traditional etymology is not universally accepted. Norbert Wagner has argued that the name of the Batavi can be explained as Celtic. Under this scenario the first part of the name would come from a Latin-Gaulish battu(ere), which Wagner associates with the name of the type of gladiator called an "andabata". Older scholarship proposed that bata came from Gaulish, meaning "to strike", or "to beat", and Wagner concludes that the meaning of the Batavi name is therefore "fighters". He argues based upon the second part of the name that it is probably older than the Germanisation of the lower Rhine, and fits within a regional cluster (Veluwe, Chamavi, Frisiavones).

There is therefore also some uncertainty about whether the ethnonym Batavi is derived from the geographical name Batavia. The standard Germanic etymology of their name would imply that an immigrating Germanic-speaking element of the Batavi must have first named the region, and then named themselves after the region. However, all of the early Roman mentions of Batavia call it simply the island of the Batavians. The Latin word "Batavia" is not found in Roman texts until centuries later, in the third century. Dio Cassius was the first to use the term, although in a Greek form, (Βαταούας as a genitive singular). Notably, while writing about the period of Augustus, he claimed that the Batavi were named after their country. On the other hand he also referred to the "Island of the Batavi" in another passage, (τῆν τῶν Βατάουων νῆσον). The Latin spelling Batavia started to appear in the late 3rd century and early 4th century Latin Panegyrics, but only after the area had been devastated and the Batavians themselves had ceased to appear in records.

== The island of the Batavi ==
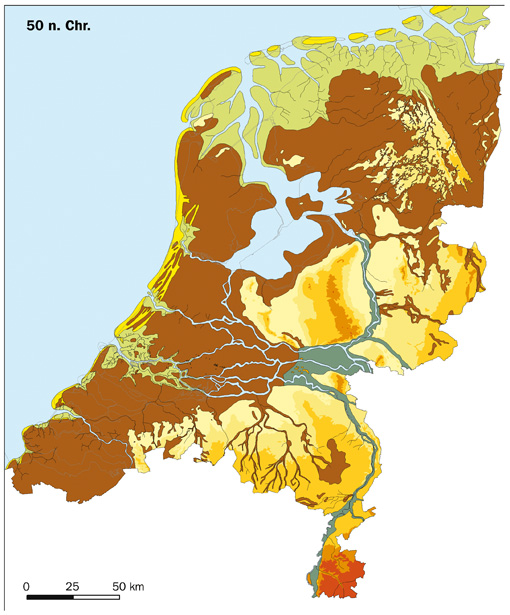
A reconstruction of the topography of the Netherlands in about 50 AD, 100 years after Caesar

The Batavi are not mentioned directly by Julius Caesar in his commentary on his Gallic Wars, which lasted from 58 to 52 BC. However, he described the "Island of the Batavi" (Insula Batavorum) as an island in the Rhine delta. He named the first large offshoot of the Rhine where the delta begins as the Waal (Latin: Vacalus), and according to him the Waal then flowed into a different river, the Maas (Latin: Mosa, French: Meuse), and together the Waal and Maas formed the southern boundary of this island. This point where the two rivers joined was no more than 80 Roman miles from the Ocean. For modern scholars there is some uncertainty about where the Waal joined the Maas, and during which periods this happened. Nico Roymans argues that they must have joined near Lith and Rossum, where the two rivers still come close to joining today. In favour of this proposal, present day Dordrecht, another possible location, is only 40 km from the coast, which does not match the distance given by Caesar.

Caesar noted that there were also many other large islands in the delta, many inhabited by barbarian nations (barbaris nationibus), some of whom were thought to live on fish and the eggs of birds. Apparently distinct from these he mentions that Menapii, a Gaulish tribe who he had fought as part of the alliance of the Belgae, were inhabiting both sides of the Rhine, somewhere near where it empties into the sea. He described the Menapii lands more generally as bordering upon the ocean, and containing areas with tidal islands, protected by forests and swamps. The Menapii were however forced back from the Rhine when the Germanic Tencteri and Usipetes attacked and used Menapian boats to cross the Rhine. The place near the sea where this Rhine crossing occurred is uncertain. Roymans, who believes eastern Batavia to have been inhabited at this time by Eburones, proposes that the Tencteri and Usipetes crossed only a branch of the Rhine, in the delta. According to this scenario they subsequently wandered eastwards out of the islands, to the area between the Maas and the "Rhine", and it was in this area that Caesar located and attacked them. Caesar reported that he slaughtered many of the women, children and elderly at the place where a branch of the Rhine (understood by Roymans to be the Waal) flowed into the Maas, forcing the survivors to the opposite side of the Rhine, where some found refuge with the Sugambri who lived east of the delta. Caesar also indicated that the lands of the Eburones, who he claimed to be defending from the Tencteri and Usipetes, also stretched to the delta. When Caesar later sought to annihilate them in 53-51 BC, many Eburones sought refuge in this region of tidal islands.

In the first century AD Tacitus and Pliny, like Caesar, continued to refer to the "Island of the Batavi", and not "Batavia". Pliny wrote about 23 AD, and described the Insula Batavorum as the most famous of the many Rhine delta islands, and he noted that the Batavi shared it with the Canninefates. On other delta islands he reported that there were Frisii, Chauci, Frisiavones, Sturii, and Marsaci. He placed the Menapii of his time south of the Scheldt, and the Eburones who had been crushed by Caesar were no longer mentioned. Tacitus later agreed with Pliny that the Canninefates shared the same island with the Batavi. He also described them as being the same as the Batavi in origin, language, and valour, but smaller in numbers.

Tacitus, writing in about 100 AD, also used the term Insula Batavorum. In his Annals he notes that it had many convenient landing places for building up a fleet, and that the island begins at the point where the Rhine first splits as it approaches the sea. He explained that the Rhine branch which splits off on the Gaulish side is called the Waal (Vahalis) by the inhabitants, and like Caesar he describes the Waal as merging into the Maas. The other primary branch of the Rhine "retains its name and the force of its current on the side that flows past Germania". In both his Germania and his Histories Tacitus notes that apart from the island surrounded by branches of the Rhine, the Batavi also occupied a smaller neighbouring region on the neighbouring "Gaulish" bank of the river.

Tacitus also mentioned the Insula Batavorum in his account of the Batavian Revolt in his Histories, when he described how the revolt temporarily drove the Roman name out of the "island of the Batavi". In another passage he describes how the Batavians sailed a fleet into the mouth of the Meuse, which was like a sea, where it "pours its waters together with the Rhine into the Ocean". After a short naval engagement the Roman general Quintus Petillius Cerialis "mercilessly ravaged the Island of the Batavi", though he left the estates of his Batavian opponent Civilis intact. "Meanwhile, however, the autumn was far advanced, and the river, swollen by the continual rains of the season, overflowed the island, marshy and low-lying as it is, till it resembled a lake. There were no ships, no provisions at hand, and the camp, which was situated on low ground, was in process of being carried away by the force of the stream."

== Origins ==
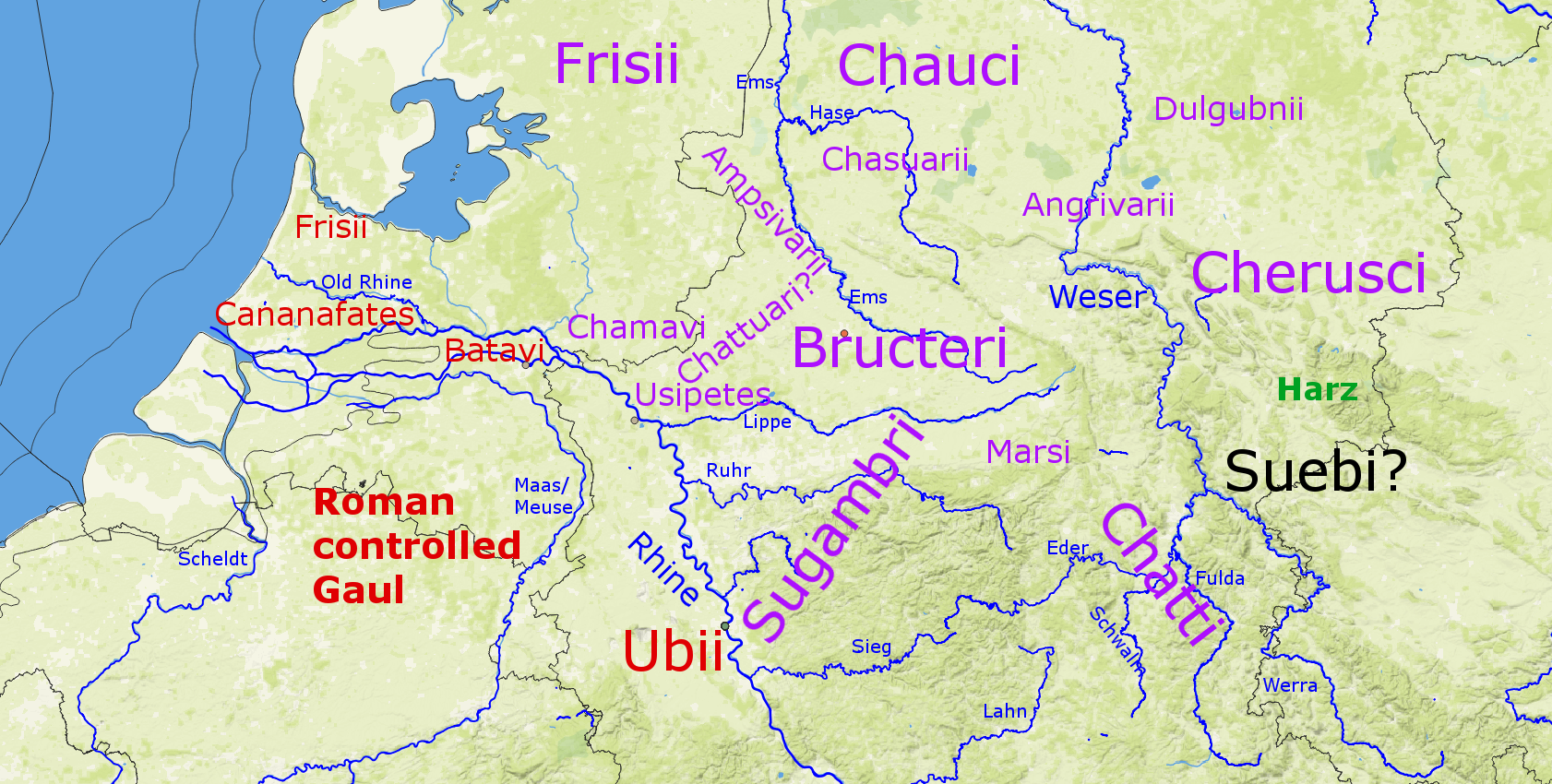
The approximate locations of the Batavians and their neighbours in about 10 BC

Writing in about 100 AD Tacitus reported that the Batavi, who he described as the most valorous of all the peoples (gentes) on the Rhine, had originally been a part of the Chatti. According to him, domestic strife (seditione domestica) forced the Batavi to move away from the other Chatti. He also emphasized that they had a privileged and old alliance (antiquae societatis) with Rome. It is however not clear exactly either when or how the Romans first came into contact with either the Batavi, or the Chatti, or when the Chatto-Batavian elite first settled in the Rhine delta. More generally, because Tacitus implies that they settled on the Rhine with the understanding of the Romans, it is believed that they settled there some time between about 55 BC in the time of Caesar's wars, and about 12 BC when the Roman's themselves established a based in the Batavian region.

It is possible that Julius Caesar himself settled the Batavi in the delta, although he never clearly mentioned either the Chatti or the Batavi in his accounts of his conquest of the region in 58–52 BC. It has even been argued that the Chatto-Batavian settlement could have happened before Caesar's arrival in the region. Although Caesar did not report the location of the Chatti in his time many historians believe they lived in the same region where they would later live in the first century AD, approximately corresponding to the modern German state of Hesse. In support of this, there is evidence that the Batavi began producing a new coinage based on one made earlier at the oppidum on the Dünsberg in Hesse, which subsequently became less active. On the basis of this coin evidence, Lanting and van der Plicht argue that the Batavian settlement must have happened about 40 BC, which would correspond to the first governorship of Agrippa in Gaul. In contrast, Petrikovits argued that the Chatti must originally have lived closer to Batavia, and that the whole people, not only the Batavians, had been forced to move under pressure from Suebian movements into the area as reported by Caesar. As evidence he noted that Dio Cassius wrote that the Chatti, like the Batavi, were assigned land by the Romans. He also noted that in the Lower Rhine region that the name of the Chattuarii, who lived east of Batavia, means "holders/inhabitants of Chatti-land". He therefore argued that they represented newcomers into the area.

By 12 BC the Romans had established their own military settlement near present day Nijmegen in Batavian territory, which was used as a base by the Roman prince and general Drusus the Elder. Evidence suggests that the first Roman settlements at Nijmegen began between 19 and 17 BC, corresponding roughly with the second governorship of Gaul by Agrippa, the son-in-law of Augustus. If the new Batavian elite were not already in the region earlier, they it is believed that they may have settled in this same period when the Romans established their own base there.

In his Germania Tacitus described the Batavian settlement in the Rhine delta as a place where the Batavi "would become part of the Roman Empire", and in his Histories he wrote that the land they seized was empty of inhabitants. However, this is contradicted by archaeological evidence, which shows continuous habitation of the eastern part of the delta from at least the third century BC onward. It is more likely that an elite group of these "Chatto-Batavians" moved to the delta and integrated themselves into a pre-existing population, bringing new traditions with them. Archaeologist Nico Roymans has argued that the pre-Roman people of Batavia were a major branch of the Eburones, who Caesar claimed to have destroyed.

Tacitus also emphasized the unusual nature of the Batavian agreements with Rome. "Their honour still remains, and the mark of their ancient alliance: they are neither burdened with tribute, nor worn down by tax-collectors. Exempt from imposts and contributions, and set apart only for the purposes of war, they are, as it were, weapons and armour, reserved for battle." And in his Histories he noted that they were not "worn down by obligations (a rare thing in alliance with stronger powers): they supplied only men and arms for the empire, long trained in German wars, and afterwards increased in renown by service in Britain, when cohorts were sent over there, which, by ancient custom, were commanded by the noblest of their countrymen. At home, too, there was a levy of cavalry, with a special skill in swimming: keeping hold of their arms and horses, they charged across the Rhine in unbroken squadrons."

Although Caesar didn't mention the Batavi he indicated that he recruited a unit of about 400 Germani horsemen, who he kept close to himself during battle at Neung-sur-Beuvron against Vercingetorix in 52 BC, and then sent into the battle at a crucial moment. Historian Michael Speidel argued these Germanic troops were the same ones mentioned in accounts of the subsequent civil wars. They were used by him against Pompey's Roman forces in Spain and Alexandria, and on at least one occasion they were used to attack across a river. The poet Lucan explicitly said that Caesar had Batavi with him during the civil war, and this is probably correct. This Germanic force therefore probably established the tradition of the Julio-Claudian dynasty's personal Germanic bodyguard, which was sometimes called the Numerus Batavorum, and was in later generations dominated by Batavi and Ubii.

== Revolt of the Batavi ==
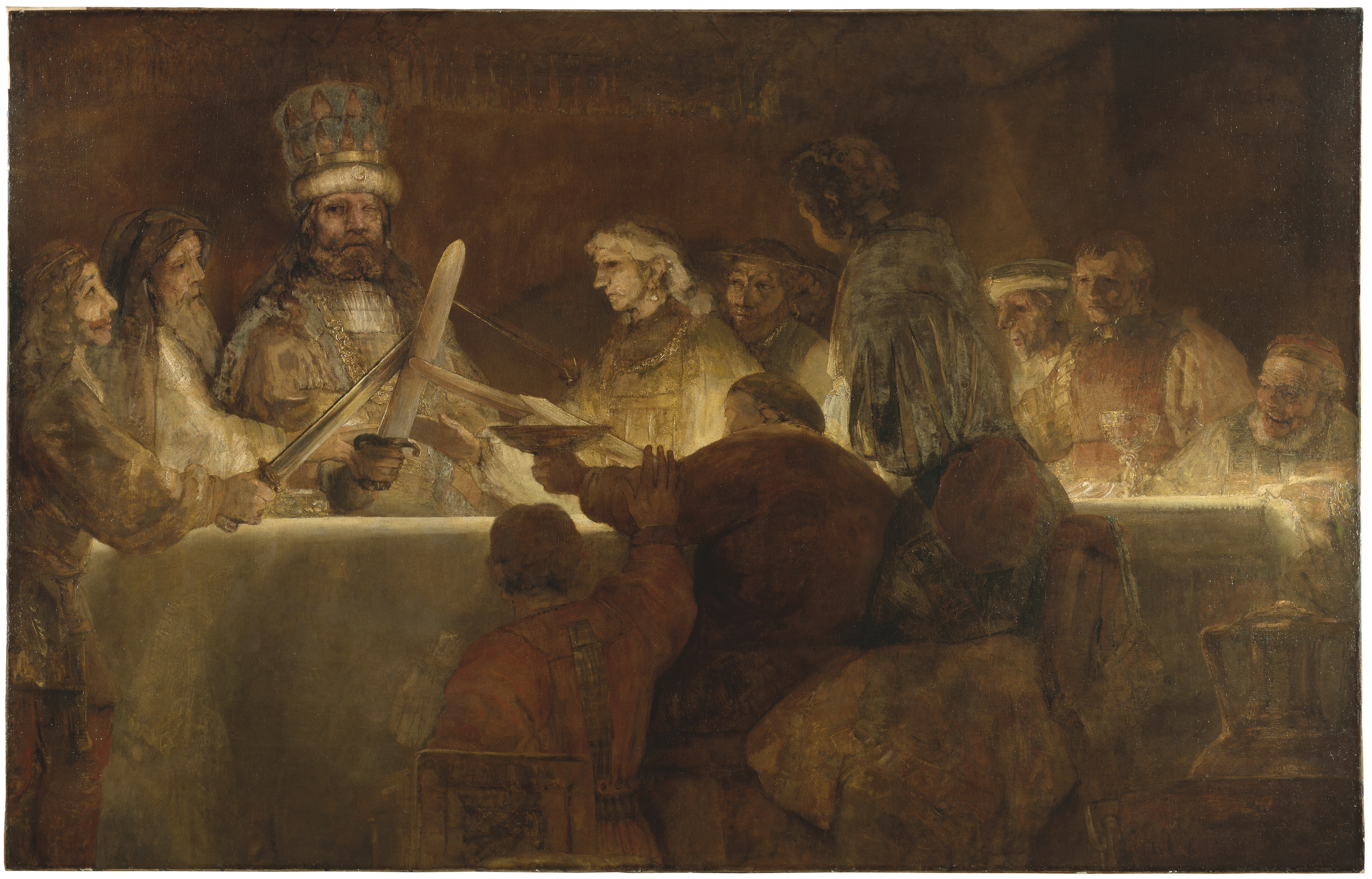
The Conspiracy of the Batavians under Claudius Civilis by Rembrandt van Rijn

After the Batavian participation in the subjugation of Britain, tensions rose between them and the empire, for reasons which are no longer clear. In 68 AD Gaius Julius Civilis, a leader of the Batavi, and a Roman citizen, was paraded in chains in Rome before Nero, accused of treason. His brother had already been executed. Nero was the last Julio-Claudian emperor, and was deposed soon after. The next emperor Galba, released him but also disbanded the Germanic bodyguard.

69 AD was the "Year of the Four Emperors". Civilis was again arrested when he returned to Gaul, by the governor of Germania inferior, Vitellius. He was released when Vitellius began putting together forces to invade Italy, to install himself as emperor. At first used the eight cohorts of Batavians who had been stationed in Britain, but riots broke out and these forces were eventually sent home where they joined the rebellion.

Civilis led the Batavi and their neighbours into the so-called Batavian revolt. He managed to capture Castra Vetera, the Romans' lost two legions, while two others (I Germanica and XVI Gallica) were controlled by the rebels. The rebellion became a real threat to the Empire when the conflict escalated to northern Gaul and Germania.

The Roman army retaliated and invaded the insula Batavorum. A bridge was built over the river Nabalia, where the warring parties approached each other on both sides to negotiate peace. The narrative was told in great detail in Tacitus' Histories, book 4, although, unfortunately, the narrative breaks off abruptly at the climax. Following the uprising, Legio X Gemina was housed in a stone fort to keep an eye on the Batavians.

As Civilis claimed to be on the side of Vespasian, who eventually won, the conflict can at least partly be seen as a part of a greater Roman civil war.

== Archaeological evidence ==
The inhabitants of Batavia both before and after Caesar show archaeological traits associated with the La Tène culture, which is a culture traditionally associated with Celts. Relevant traits include major fortified settlements called oppida, the use of specific types of coins, and the emergence of collective sanctuaries in Empel, Kessel near modern Lith, and Elst, which continued to be used into imperial times. Glass bracelets associated with the La Tène culture also remained very popular in eastern Batavia into the first century AD, under imperial rule.

On the other hand, pottery and house architecture evidence indicates "a substantial, if not dominant, emergence of new forms, structures and techniques during the second half of the 1st century BC", along with indications of continuity. There was an increased diversity, and hybridization of technologies, which were influenced by neighbouring regions to the west, on the coast, and east, in what is now northern Germany. This has been interpreted as evidence that not one but several groups immigrated, "probably over a longer period of time, originating from different regions and arriving in a land where a (probably limited) residual population was still living".

Coin use also increased significantly in the Lower Rhine area already in the second half of the first century BC, in the period after Caesar's conquests there. This included the eastern delta region, while there appears to have initially been less coin use near the coast.

== Roman capital at Nijmegen ==
Archaeological evidence shows that a Roman military settlement was started in about 19 BC on the Hunnerberg, which is upon a ridge to the southeast of the city centre of Nijmegen. About 15000 troops are estimated to have been stationed there, and 42 hectares were used. More or less simultaneously a new Batavian settlement was built just to the west, closer to the river, and this is believed to be the place referred to as both the Oppida Batavorum and Batavodurum, in a single passage of Tacitus.

During the Clades Lolliana in 16 BC, when Sicambri, Tencteres and Usipetes from east of the Rhine suddenly attacked Roman forces, it is likely that the Oppida was abandoned, but with the strengthening of imperial focus upon the area the Oppida was renewed and a new Roman command post fort was built east of the existing fort on the Kops plateau. This appears to have been used sometimes as a base for the imperial princes who led the major offensives east of the Rhine during the Roman campaigns in Germania (12 BC – AD 16).

After the victories of Romans and their establishment of frontier forts along the Rhine, the town developed in a way which show significant Roman influence. In around 40 AD, the fort on the Kops plateau became the home of an elite cavalry unit, probably the Ala Batavorum.

After the Batavian Revolt of 69-70, the settlements and forts changed significantly. The Oppida was burnt down deliberately by the Batavians, as reported by Tacitus, and after the revolt the focus of civilian buildings was to the west of this, in a lower lying Waterkwartier district near the river, while the original oppida in what is now the centre of Nijmegen was left undeveloped. It is in the west that a Roman city eventually formed, with the name of Ulpia Noviomagus, from which the modern name of Nijmegen is derived. In the east, military settlements continued to exist for Roman and auxiliary troops, and a new fort was built at the Hunnerberg area. It was probably an official Roman municipality by 100 AD.

Ulpia Noviomagus and many other settlements in the region were abandoned around 280 AD. Diocletian who reasserted Roman authority, built a fort in the centre of the former settlement of Oppidum Batavorum.

== Military ==
The first Batavian to be mentioned by name was Chariovalda who, along with other Batavian nobles, led a unit of Batavi who fought as Roman allies under the Roman prince and general Germanicus, against the Cherusci and their allies on the river Weser river in 16 AD. It is not clear when and how the Batavi were converted into regular Roman auxiliary cohorts.

=== Imperial bodyguard ===
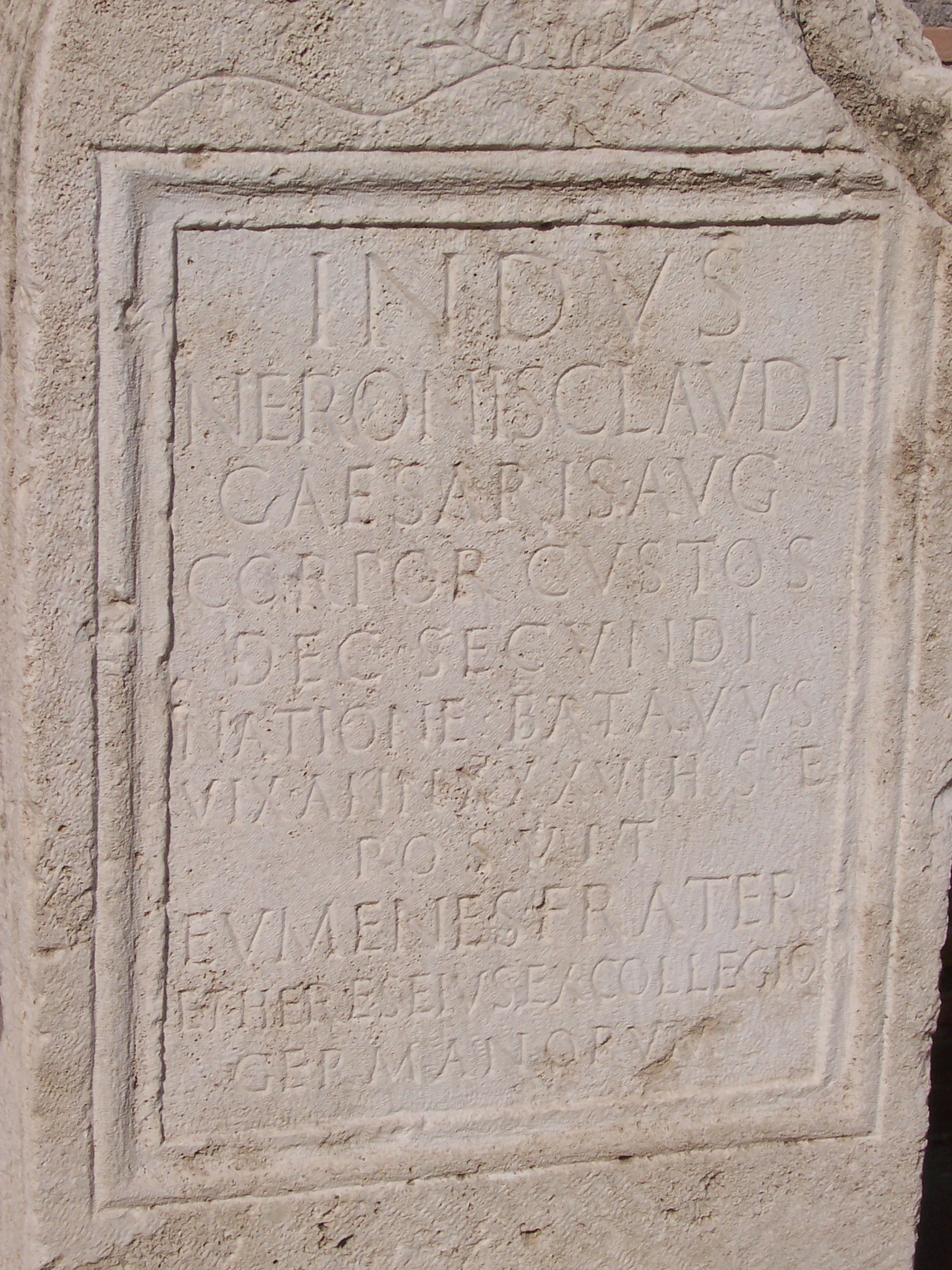
Funerary stela of one of Nero's Corporis Custodes, the imperial Germanic bodyguard. The bodyguard, Indus, was of the Batavian tribe.

Over a long period, the Batavian and Ubian soldiers traditionally made up a large part of the Roman Emperor's personal Germanic bodyguard, together with smaller numbers from other tribes in their region.

The Julio-Claudian dynasty from Augustus to Nero, had a Germanic bodyguard called the Germani corpore custodes. Dio Cassius stated directly that the bodyguard of Augustus were Batavians, named after their island homeland and excellent horsemen. Suetonius also noted that the emperor Caligula was specifically advised to recruit Batavians to attend him. This unit was disbanded by Galba after Nero, the last emperor of this dynasty, died. Scholars such as Speidel and Roymans argue that this connection to the emperors probably started in the time of Caesar.

Batavians were also recruited into the horse guards of later Emperors' horse guards, the Equites singulares Augusti beginning during the time of the Nerva-Antonine dynasty. This unit also came to be referred to as the Batavians. It is not clear when this unit was founded. Speidel suggests that it may have already been set-up by Domitian. More clearly, the evidence for the new horseguard is stronger from the time of Trajan, who was a governor based on the Rhine before becoming emperor.

=== The Ala I Batavorum ===
An elite cavalry unit (Latin: ala, literally "wing") of Batavi are known to have existed in Batavia itself. It is first mentioned by Tacitus in the context of the Batavian revolt, during which it rebelled against its commander Labeo, and switched to the side of Civilis. Either the same unit, or a new one with the same name, existed after the revolt, and in the second century it was transferred to Pannonia and Dacia on the Danube.

While many scholars presume there was only one such unit, J.A. van Rossum believes there were two at the beginning of the Batavian revolt, seeing the unit which Tacitus described as being under Civilis as one of the units. Other scholars have seen the unit under Civilis in different ways, for example as one of the eight cohortes equitatae, or as an otherwise unattested ninth one, or even as a special unit made up of returned imperial bodyguards after the disbandment in Rome.

=== Auxiliary "equitatae" Cohorts ===
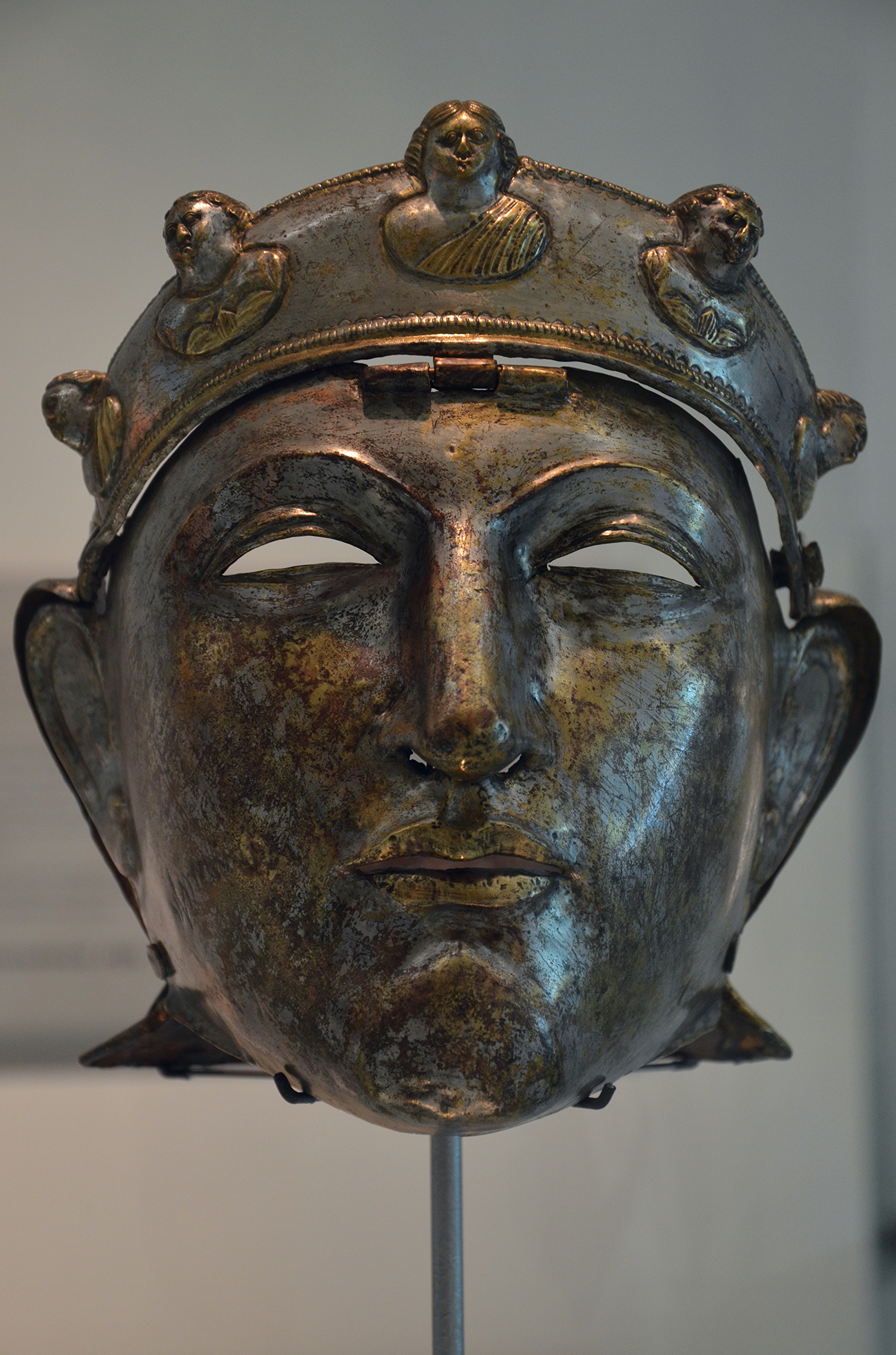
A Roman cavalry helmet, discovered in 1915 near Nijmegen, from the second half of the first century, at Valkhof Museum

Apart from the imperial bodyguard, and the 1 or 2 Ala units kept close to home the Batavi in the first century AD provided 8 auxiliary cohorts which each included cavalry, all with their own Batavian command structures. While the Ala Batavorum unit appears to have stayed close to home in this period, the other eight were part-cavalry units cohortes equitatae, each with about 500 men, and are best known for their important role in the subjugation of Britain. In line with more general changes being made to cohort sizes, these eight were eventually transformed after the Batavian Revolt, giving four 1000-man ("milliary") cohorts, numbered I, II, III and IX. These 4 units were returned to serve in Britain during the late first and early second century.

In the second century many of the Batavian units were moved east, to areas near the Danube frontier. In about 130 AD, Cohort I was in Noricum, and Cohort II was in Dacia, and both were apparently in Pannonia in 98 AD. Cohort III was in Raetia in 107 and in Pannonia by 135, while Cohort IX was in Raetia by 116. The units were no longer being posted close to each other, and were no longer commanded or manned exclusively by Batavians. A single 500 man unit continued to serve in Britain until the 3rd or 4th century, and was already present there in 122 AD.

Numerous altars and tombstones of the cohorts of Batavi, dating to the second century and third century, have been found along Hadrian's Wall, notably at Castlecary and Carrawburgh. As well as in Germany, Yugoslavia, Hungary, Romania and Austria.

=== Swimming skills ===
The Germanic soldiers of Julius Caesar, who probably included Batavi, were used to make attacks at rivers. In the Battle of the Nile (47 BC), scattered groups of Caesar's Germanic cavalry forded the Nile.

About 150 years later, Tacitus especially associated this skill with Batavian forces, and their fellow Germani who lived across the Rhine. He described how the Batavi had a home-based elite cavalry corps (domi delectus eques), "distinguished by a special zeal for swimming: holding on to their weapons and horses, they were able to force their way through the Rhine with their squadrons unbroken". Already in 16 AD Tacitus mentions Batavi auxiliaries who travelled in the fleet of Germanicus from the Rhine delta to the mouth of the Ems, where "the cavalry and the legions fearlessly crossed the first estuaries in which the tide had not yet risen. However, the rear of the auxiliaries, and the Batavi among the number, plunging recklessly into the water and displaying their skill in swimming, fell into disorder, and some were drowned." In a later part of this campaign a major battle was fought against the Cherusci of Arminius. Germanicus, confronted by the Cherusci and their allies on the opposite side of the Weser, decided to first send cavalry across before trying to ford with the main force across the river. While two high-ranking Romans Stertinius and Aemilius attacked at widely different points so as to distract the enemy, "Chariovalda, the Batavian chief (dux), dashed to the charge where the stream is most rapid". Chariovalda and many of the Batavian nobles fell after "plunging into the thickest of the battle".

Several more historical examples of this skill are noted by scholars, and believed to have involved the Batavi, even when they were not named explicitly:

- Dio Cassius, who wrote in Greek and categorized Germani as Celts, described a surprise tactic employed by Aulus Plautius using special "Celtic" forces against the British at the battle of the River Medway in 43 AD: "When they reached a certain river, which the barbarians thought the Romans would not be able to cross without a bridge and so were encamped somewhat carelessly on the opposite bank, he sent across some Celts, men whose custom it was to swim easily through the swiftest streams in full armour".
- In 69 AD, when the usurper Vitellius entered Italy from Gaul with Batavian forces, Tacitus says that Batavians, after several successes, became excited when they reached the Po river and suddenly crossed it together with troops from beyond the Rhine (Latin: Batavos transrhenanosque).
- During a subsequent battle won by Vitellius against his opponent the emperor Otho, Batavian cavalry were used on the Po river against a band of gladiators recruited by Otho.
- Tacitus also describes a battle which occurred once Civilis initiated the Batavian revolt against Vitellius in northern Gaul. When the Roman loyalist Claudius Labeo tried to hold a bridge over the Maas, perhaps at present day Maastricht, the "Germani" of the Batavian rebel Civilis swam the river and attacked Labeo from behind.
- In later phase of the revolt, Civilis defended a position at Castra Vetera near Xanten by building a dam in the Rhine to flood part of the countryside. Tacitus remarked that Roman soldiers, are heavily armed and afraid to swim, while the Germani are accustomed to rivers, and helped by the lightness of their equipment and because they are tall.
- In his account of the Roman conquest of the island of Mona (Anglesey) in 77, Tacitus mentions the elite auxiliary (non Roman) forces based in Britain, who knew the fords and "who by native practice in swimming could at once control themselves, their arms, and their horses". Gnaeus Julius Agricola successfully used them to take the rebellion there by surprise. Suetonius Paulinus had used ships for an infantry attack on Mona, in an earlier attempt of 60-61 AD. Tacitus however mentions that the cavalry forded the straits by swimming when the water became deep.

There is a "famous" inscription about one of the "Batavi" in the Roman army which is in the form of a poem, "perhaps written by the emperor Hadrian himself". It commemorates a soldier named Soranus, who in the summer of 118 swam in full armour with his horse across the Danube, while Hadrian watched. Speidel proposed that this "Batavian" was probably not ethnically Batavian, but rather a member of the emperor's elite unit, the equites singulares Augusti, which was commonly referred to still as "the Batavi". As a skilled archer, Soranus is likely in this period and unit to have been recruited in Syria or Arabia. Dio Cassius described the role of Hadrian's elite "Batavians" as extremely important in the campaigns of this period in the early second century. According to him, barbarians were horrified to see how well prepared and trained the Romans were, which helped Hadrian to keep the peace. "So excellently, indeed, had his soldiery been trained that the cavalry of the Batavians, as they were called, swam the Danube with their arms. Seeing all this, the barbarians stood in terror of the Romans, and turning their attention to their own affairs, they employed Hadrian as an arbitrator of their differences."

=== "Batavian" Auxilia Palatina ===
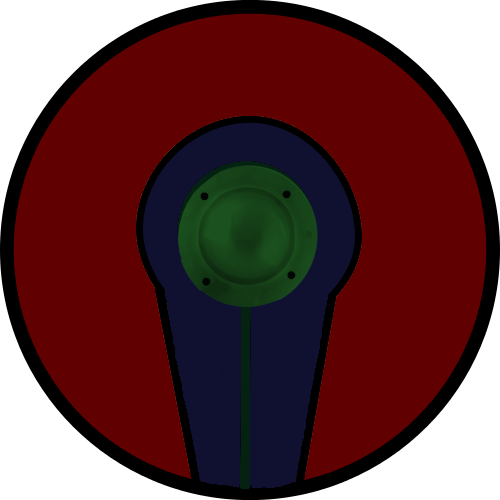
Shield pattern of the Batavi Seniores as illustrated in the Notitia Dignitatum

New "Batavian" units were created in the late third or early fourth century known as the Batavi seniores, Batavi iuniores, Equites Batavi seniores en Equites Batavi iuniores. These are for example mentioned in the Notitia Dignitatum, which probably represents the situation around 400 AD.

However, by this time the Batavi themselves are no longer mentioned in Roman sources as an ethnic group. Batavia was instead described as being dominated by Franks since the third century. The Romans in the late third century depopulated the area after it had been rebellious under the Franks. Apart from the heavy recruitment of population into the military there was also a largescale movement of population to help the economy in southern Gaul.

== Fate of the Batavi ==
After the defeat of the revolt, the Batavi royal clan lost some of its authority and by about 100 AD, the Batavi state or civitas Batavorum was given municipium status within the Roman administrative system.

Although inscriptional evidence shows that many residents still identified primarily as Batavi, during the 2nd and early third centuries there is also a new tendency of residents who referred to themselves as people of the civitas capital at Noviomagus, or Ulpia Noviomagus, (modern Nijmegen). This may have been influenced not only by the decreased importance of the old royal family, but also by the increasing proportion of people there who now had Roman citizenship, or who descended from new settlers from other parts of the empire, such as veterans and traders.

During the crisis of the third century and the subsequent revolt of the Menapian Carausius, the Romans lost control of the Rhine delta. Ulpia Noviomagus was abandoned by about 250 AD. The Panegyrici Latini report that the area was taken over by Frankish peoples. Two peoples who were specifically named were the Frisii and Chamavi who may have both been considered Franks. It has been argued that even before Carausius the rebel emperor Postumus (reigned about 260-269) himself was a native of the Rhine delta, and had already allowed the settlement of early Franks south of the Rhine. His soldiers are referred to by one near contemporary, Eumenius, as "Batavian robbers".

The Roman military reasserted itself around 293-294 AD when it was reconquered by Constantius Chlorus. The new "tetrarchy" emperors moved large numbers of the inhabitants to other regions, and brought many into the Roman military. The population and agricultural activity decreased dramatically, and the Romans gave it up as an area for normal taxation and governance. Some Frankish dediticii were allowed to remain in Batavia. New Roman military units were created from the defeated Franks, known as the Batavi seniores, Batavi iuniores, Equites Batavi seniores en Equites Batavi iuniores. New fortifications were built at Noviomagus around 300 AD, and the Roman military continued to use this and other delta forts until the second half of the 5th century.

Franks were also later allowed to settle south of the Meuse in Texandria by emperor Constans in 342 AD, after fighting there in 341 AD. Julian the apostate also associated the usurper Magnentius, who had killed emperor Constans and ruled the region in 350-353 AD, with the Franks and Saxons of this region. In the 4th century some of the peoples of the region including the Chamavi were also referred to with another new name, as "Saxons". By 358, after the Chamavi once again attempted to take control of the area, the Salian Franks were accepted by the Romans as the local rulers of Batavia. Julian created still more military units named after the Salians, Chamavii and their neighbours the Tubantes.

In the Late Roman army there was still units called Batavi. The name of the Bavarian town of Passau descends from the Roman Batavis, which was named after such a unit, and was next to a much older settlement called Boiodurum (now Innstadt). (Passau's modern name shows the typical effects of the High German consonant shift of b to p and t to ss.) The Notitia Dignitatum mentions a tribune of the cohort of "novae Batavorum, Batavis", and this tribune was under the Dux of Raetia, while Boiodurum was under the Dux of Noricum and Pannonia. It also lists a tribune of the "first Batavian cohort" in Procolitia (modern Carrawburgh) on Hadrian's Wall in Britain.

The Notitia Dignitatum notes the existence of prefects for "Batavian" laeti populations in Gaul — barbarians who lived within the empire and provided troops. At Arras and Condren there were prefects for Batavi laeti, and in the area of Bayeux and Coutances in what is now Normandy (Baiocas et Constantiae Lugdunensis secundae) there was a prefect for Batavian and Suebian laeti.

== The Batavian revival ==
In the 16th-century emergence of a popular foundation story and origin myth for the Dutch people, the Batavians came to be regarded as their ancestors during their national struggle for independence during the Eighty Years' War. The mix of fancy and fact in the Cronyke van Hollandt, Zeelandt ende Vriesland (called the Divisiekroniek) by the Augustinian friar and humanist Cornelius Gerardi Aurelius, first published in 1517, brought the spare remarks in Tacitus' newly rediscovered Germania to a popular public; it was being reprinted as late as 1802. Contemporary Dutch virtues of independence, fortitude and industry were fully recognizable among the Batavians in more scholarly history represented in Hugo Grotius' Liber de Antiquitate Republicae Batavicorum (1610). The origin was perpetuated by Romeyn de Hooghe's Spiegel van Staat der Vereenigden Nederlanden ("Mirror of the State of the United Netherlands," 1706), which also ran to many editions, and it was revived in the atmosphere of Romantic nationalism in the late eighteenth-century reforms that saw a short-lived Batavian Republic and, in the colony of the Dutch East Indies, a capital that was named Batavia. Though since Indonesian independence the city is called Jakarta, its inhabitants up to the present still call themselves Betawi or Orang Betawi, i.e. "People of Batavia" – a name ultimately derived from the ancient Batavians.

However, a disadvantage of this historical nationalism soon became apparent. It suggested there were no strong external borders, while allowing for the fairly clear-cut internal borders that were emerging as the society polarized into three parts. After 1945, the tribal knowledge lost its grip on anthropology and mostly vanished. Modern variants of the Batavian founding myth are made more accurate by pointing out that the Batavians were one part of the ancestry of the Dutch people - together with the Frisians, Franks and Saxons – by tracing patterns of DNA. Echoes of this cultural continuity can still be found among various areas of Dutch modern culture, such as the very popular replica of the ship Batavia that can today be found in Lelystad.

== See also ==
- Germanisation of Gaul
- Laeti
- List of Germanic peoples

== Bibliography ==
- Callies, Horst (1975), "Bataver § 1. Historisches", in Beck, Heinrich; Geuenich, Dieter; Steuer, Heiko (eds.), Reallexikon der Germanischen Altertumskunde, vol. 2 (2 ed.), De Gruyter, pp. 90–91, ISBN 978-3-11-006740-8
- Derks, Tom (2009). "Ethnic identity in the Roman frontier. The epigraphy of Batavi and other Lower Rhine tribes". In Derks, Ton; Roymans, Nico (eds.). Ethnic Constructs in Antiquity: The Role of Power and Tradition. Amsterdam University Press. ISBN 978-90-8964-078-9.
- Derks, Tom; Teitler, Hans (2019), "Batavi in the Roman Army of the Principate: An Inventory of the Sources", Bonner Jahrbücher, 218: 53–80
- Dierkens, Alain; Périn, Patrick (2003), "The 5th-century advance of the Franks in Belgica II: history and archaeology", Essays on the Early Franks, Barkhuis, pp. 165–193
- Habermehl, Diederick; van Kerckhove, Julie; Roymans, Nico; Kootker, Lisette; Boreel, Gerard; Braekmans, Dennis; Heeren, Stijn (2022), "Investigating migration and mobility in the Early Roman frontier. The case of the Batavi in the Dutch Rhine delta (c. 50/30 BC–AD 40)", Germania, 100: 65–108
- Lanting; van der Plicht (2010), "De ^{14}C-chronologie van de Nederlandse Pre- en Protohistorie VI: Romeinse tijd en Merovingische periode, deel A: historische bronnen en chronologische schema's", Palaeohistoria, vol. 51/52, p. 62, ISBN 978-90-77922-73-6
- Neumann, Günter (1981), "Chattwarier § 1. Der Name", in Beck, Heinrich; Geuenich, Dieter; Steuer, Heiko (eds.), Reallexikon der Germanischen Altertumskunde, vol. 4 (2 ed.), De Gruyter, pp. 391–392, ISBN 978-3-11-006513-8
- Neumann, Günter (2008) [1983], "Die Sprachverhältnissein den germanischen Provinzen des Römischen Reiches", Namenstudien zum Altgermanischen, De Gruyter, doi:10.1515/9783110210446
- Nixon, C E V; Rodgers, Barbara Saylor (1994). In praise of later Roman emperors: the Panegyrici Latini. Berkeley: University of California Press. ISBN 0-520-08326-1.
- Petrikovits, Harald (1981), "Chatten II. Historisches", in Beck, Heinrich; Geuenich, Dieter; Steuer, Heiko (eds.), Reallexikon der Germanischen Altertumskunde, vol. 4 (2 ed.), De Gruyter, pp. 379–386, ISBN 978-3-11-006513-8
- Rasch, Gerhard (2005), "Antike geographische Namen nördlich der Alpen", in Zimmer, Stefan (ed.), Reallexikon der Germanischen Altertumskunde - Ergänzungsbände, vol. 47, De Gruyter, doi:10.1515/9783110908213, ISBN 978-3-11-017832-6
- Roselaar, Saskia T. (2016), "State-Organised Mobility in the Roman Empire: Legionaries and Auxiliaries", In Migration and Mobility in the Early Roman Empire, Brill, doi:10.1163/9789004307377_008
- Roymans, Nico (2004). Ethnic Identity and Imperial Power: The Batavians in the Early Roman Empire. Amsterdam University Press. ISBN 978-90-5356-705-0.
- Roymans, Nico (2009). "Hercules and the construction of a Batavian identity in the context of the Roman empire". In Derks, Tom; Roymans, Nico (eds.). Ethnic Constructs in Antiquity: The Role of Power and Tradition. Amsterdam University Press. ISBN 978-90-8964-078-9.
- Roymans, Nico (2014), "The Batavians between Germania and Rome", in Janković, Marko A.; Mihajlović, Vladimir D.; Babić, Staša (eds.), The Edges of the Roman World, Cambridge Scholars Publishing, ISBN 978-1-4438-5899-1
- Roymans, Nico; Heeren, Stijn (2021), "Romano-Frankish interaction in the Lower Rhine frontier zone from the late 3rd to the 5th century – Some key archaeological trends explored", Germania, 99: 133–156, doi:10.11588/ger.2021.92212
- Roymans, Nico (2018), "A Roman Massacre in the Far North. Caesar's Annihilation of the Tencteri and Usipetes in the Dutch River Area", in Fernández-Götz, M; Roymans, Nico (eds.), Conflict Archaeology. Materialities of Collective Violence in Late Prehistoric and Early Historic Europe, Taylor and Francis, pp. 167–181
- Speidel, Michael P. (1991), "Swimming the Danube under Hadrian's eyes: A Feat of the Emperors' Batavi Horse Guard", Ancient Society, 22: 277–282
- Speidel, Michael P. (1994). Riding for Caesar: The Roman Emperors' Horse Guards. Routledge. ISBN 978-1-135-78255-9.
- Speidel, Michael P. (1996), "Raising New Units for the Late Roman Army: "Auxilia Palatina"", Dumbarton Oaks Papers, 50: 163–170
- Toorians, Lauran (2006), "Betuwe en Hessen, Bataven en Chatten", Naamkunde (36 (2005-2006)): 179–190
- Van Enckevort, Harry; Heirbaut, Elly N. A. (2015), "Nijmegen, from Oppidum Batavorum to Ulpia Noviomagus, civitas of the Batavi: two successive civitas-capitals", Gallia, vol. 72, pp. 285–298, doi:10.4000/gallia.1577, ISBN 978-2-271-08834-5, ISSN 0016-4119
- van Rossum, J.A. (2004), "The end of the Batavian auxiliaries as 'national' units", in de Ligt, Luuk; Hemelrijk, Emily; Singor, H.W. (eds.), In Roman Rule and Civic Life: Local and Regional Perspectives. Proceedings of the Fourth Workshop of the International Network Impact of Empire, Impact of Empire, vol. 4, Brill, doi:10.1163/9789004401655_008, ISBN 9789004401655
- Wagner, Norbert (2015), "Lemovii, Helvecones*, Batavi, Βατίνοι, Chamavi, Cherusci Stammesnamen zwischen Germanen und Kelten", Historische Sprachforschung / Historical Linguistics, 128: 289–298
