= Numerus Batavorum =

Roman imperial guard unit

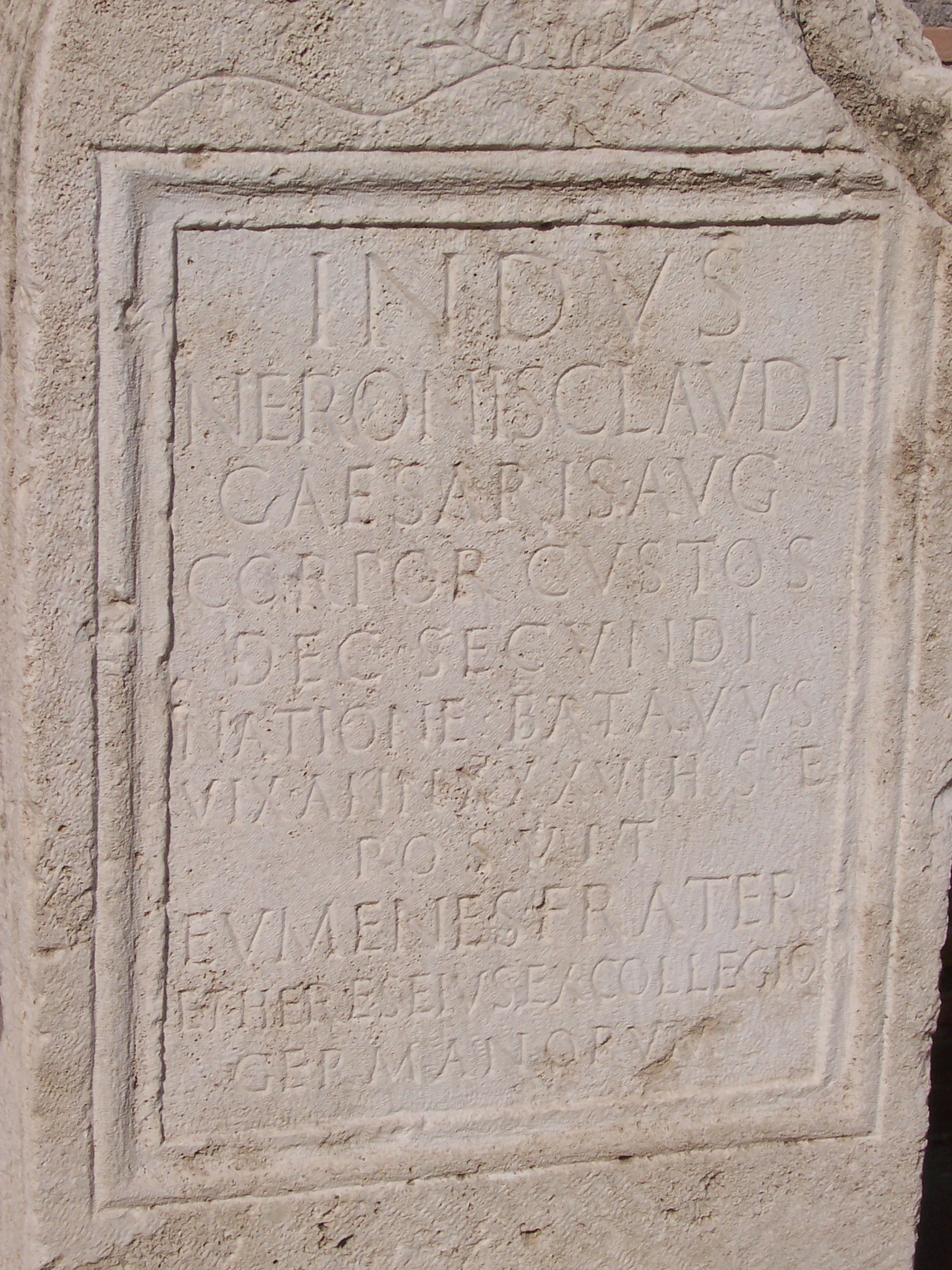
Gravestone of Indus, a member of the Germanic Bodyguard

The Numerus Batavorum, also called the cohors Germanorum, Germani corporis custodes, Germani corpore custodes, Imperial German Bodyguard or Germanic bodyguard, was a personal, imperial guards unit for the Roman emperors of the Julio-Claudian dynasty (30 BC – AD 68) composed of Germanic soldiers. Although the Praetorians may be considered the Roman emperor's main bodyguard, the Germanic bodyguards were a unit of more personal guards recruited from distant parts of the Empire, so they had no political or personal connections with Rome or the provinces.

From Commentarii de Bello Gallico, it is known that Julius Caesar also had a Germanic bodyguard.

== Overview ==
The members of the Numerus Batavorum were recruited from the Germanic tribes resident in, or on the borders of, the Roman province of Germania Inferior, with most recruits drawn from the Batavi but also from neighbouring tribes of the Rhine delta region, including the Frisii, Baetasii and Ubii. Little is known about their organization; the 500 bodyguards were formed up in five centuries, each century commanded by a centurion. From inscriptions it is known that there existed, as in all Roman cavalry units, the officer rank of decurion. The exact size of the unit, which was at least partially mounted, is also unknown, but is described in ancient sources as a cohort, which in this period normally implied a strength of 500 men or less, similar to a numerus, whose size could vary. Under the Emperor Caligula, the Bodyguard may have consisted of 500 to 1,000 men.

The Germanic Cohort was valued as loyal and reliable. Emperors like Nero trusted the Germani especially because they were not of Roman origin.

The guard was disbanded briefly after the Battle of the Teutoburg Forest, and was finally dissolved by Galba in 68 because of its loyalty to Nero (ruled 54–68), whom he had overthrown. The decision caused deep offense to the Batavi, and contributed to the outbreak of the Revolt of the Batavi in the following year. Their indirect successors were the Equites singulares Augusti which were, likewise, mainly recruited from the Germani. They were apparently so similar to the Julio-Claudians' earlier Germanic Bodyguard that they were given the same nickname, the "Batavi".

Herod the Great, a client king of Judea, had a Germanic bodyguard modeled upon that of Augustus.

== See also ==
- Leibgarde
- The Varangian Guard, serving in the period from under the Eastern emperor Basil II and culminating in the 1204 Sack of Constantinople

== Bibliography ==
- Grünewald, Thomas; Schalles, Hans-Joachim (2001). Germania inferior (in German). De Gruyter. ISBN 978-3-11-016969-0.
- Rankov, Boris (1994). The Praetorian Guard. Osprey. ISBN 978-1-85532-361-2.
- Webster, Graham (1998) [3rd edition first published 1985]. The Roman Imperial Army of the First and Second Centuries AD (3rd ed.). University of Oklahoma Press. ISBN 978-0-8061-3000-2.
