= Hird =

Informal retinue of personal armed companions in Scandinavian history

The hird (also named "De Håndgangne Menn" in Norwegian), in Scandinavian history, was originally an informal retinue of personal armed companions, hirdmen or housecarls. Over time, it came to mean not only the nucleus ('Guards') of the royal army but also a more formal royal court household.

== Etymology ==
The term comes from Old Norse hirð, (meaning Herd) again from either Old English hir(e)d 'household, family, retinue, court' or perhaps the old German cognate heirat 'marriage', both of which can mean "body of men" or more directly linked to the term for hearthguard, or men of one's own home and hearth.

== History ==
While the term is often used in Norse sagas and law codices, it is a medieval term – the sagas were primarily written down in the 12th century using the language of their own time. There is some uncertainty as to what the term replaced, although the term hlid or lið (Note: The name lið or lithsmen is an ambiguous term which is thought to mean 'sailor' in Anglo-Saxon, but seems to mean 'warrior' in the Danish literature. However they were undoubtedly some form of standing mercenary force.) is used in Danish sources for the warrior following of Canute the Great.

By the reign of Håkon IV (1204–1263) the Norwegian hird was no longer exclusively focused on the military function, and had acquired several subdivisions on continental patterns, with squires (kertilsveinr, literally "candle-men", which were ceremonially required to hold candles at hird ceremonies), men-at-arms (hirdmenn) and knights (skutilsveinr, literally "table-men"). In addition there were gestir, who received only half pay and served as a sort of intelligence service, and were not allowed to sit at the king's table for supper, apart from Christmas day and Easter day, when the entire hird was assembled and sections of their law code, the Hirdskraa was read or recited. The upper levels of the hird were a recruitment ground for numerous royal officials, and most external officials were also incorporated into the hird. Somewhere during the reign of Magnus VI the older laws of the Hird were incorporated into the Hirdskraa law code. During the reign of Håkon V (1299–1319) the Norse titles were dropped entirely in favor of continental titles. Emphasis was put on the Norwegian king's hird as a community of equals, a chivalresque corporation of warriors in which, technically, the king was the first among equals.

== Hirdman ==
Hirdman (plural Hirdmen) is a word in Scandinavian languages (notably Norwegian and Swedish), literally for a member of a Hird 'household, family'.

It is used as a title, originally, even in Norse mythology, for informal companions or retainers of the powerful, in the unruly old (often still pagan) times especially as companions in arms, later more refined like courtiers, a development not unlike that of the thegn or the Roman comes.

When the Norwegian royal hird had developed into a formal court, hirdman became the title of the highest of its four ranks, those magnates who were allowed to sit in the royal council (the closest feudal equivalent of a cabinet) and thus had a say in governmental and other important matters.

== See also ==
- Thingmen
- Druzhina
