= Civitas Tungrorum =

Roman administrative district

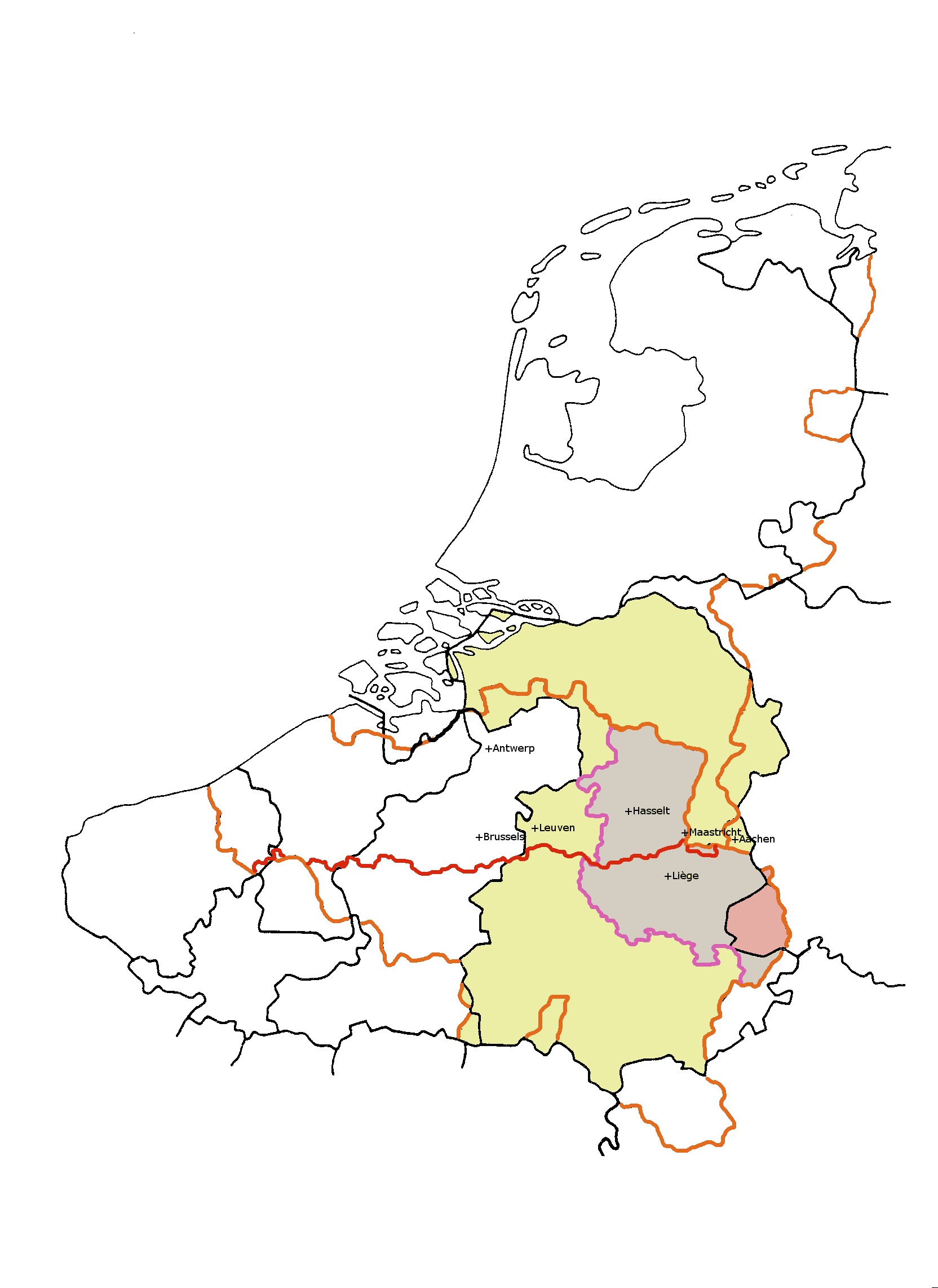
This map shows the old Diocese of Liège (in yellow) which evolved from the Civitas Tungrorum and probably had similar boundaries. The modern Belgian provinces of Liège and Limburg are also shown. The red boundary that separates them is the modern language border between Dutch and French. The orange lines are modern national borders.

The Civitas Tungrorum was a large Roman administrative district dominating what is now eastern Belgium and the southern Netherlands. In the early days of the Roman Empire it was in the province of Gallia Belgica, but it later joined the neighbouring lower Rhine River border districts, within the province of Germania Inferior. Its capital was Aduatuca Tungrorum, now Tongeren.

Like many other Roman administrative districts, it was named after the tribal grouping that lived there, the Tungri, although that name is not known from the area before it became part of the Roman Empire. Also like other such districts, it became the basis for a medieval bishopric, but the bishops of Tongeren later moved to nearby Maastricht and then to Liège.

== Location ==
The geographical boundaries of the civitas probably corresponded at least roughly to the area of the large medieval Catholic diocese of Liège, which was reduced in 1559. In modern terms this large diocese contained approximately the Belgian provinces of Limburg, Liège, Namur, and part of Luxembourg; and the Netherlands provinces of Limburg, and North Brabant. It also contained the medieval imperial city of Aachen, now in Germany.

Many early medieval dioceses were based upon older Roman provinces. And it is known that this diocese saw itself as the diocese of the Civitas Tungrorum. However, doubts exist about exact borders, in this case due to the fact that the northern part of the civitas was for a long time pagan Frankish, and outside of Roman or Catholic influence. Edith Wightman, considering the question of the locations of the tribes Caesar originally met here, goes as far as saying that this region "had the least stable political situation of any within later Belgica, and since the pattern was repeated in the Middle Ages, bishopric boundaries are of no help".

In modern terms, the region covered all or most of eastern Belgium. The southern part is generally treated as if it had the same boundaries as the later diocese.

- East-southeast the territory apparently stretched as far as the Eifel area of modern Germany, near Prüm and Bitburg, which included the territory of the Caeroesi tribe. These were in the civitas of the Ubii, with their capital at Cologne.
- South-southeast, the diocese stretched into the northern part of modern Luxembourg, and bordered upon the civitas of the Treverii in Gallia Belgica, which had its capital in Trier.
- In the south, it stretched into the Ardennes to approximately the modern border with France. Over this border was the civitas of the Remi, with their Roman capital at Rheims, within Gallia Belgica.
- In the southwest, the neighbouring civitas was that of the Nervians or Nervii, which stretched through what is now central Belgium, and had its Roman capital in Bavay in what is now northern France. In medieval times their territory corresponded approximately to the Roman Catholic Archdiocese of Cambrai, which once stretched as far north as Antwerp.
- In the west, the civitas and its later diocese stretched towards the Dyle river, and probably included Namur, and Leuven (which was in the medieval diocese), but it probably did not include Antwerp (which was not in the medieval diocese).

There is less certainty about the borders of the civitas to the north and east, where pagan Franks settled in between the times of Saint Servatius and Lambert of Maastricht, leading to a possible disruption of administrative districts.

- To the northwest and north, where the ancient Scheldt ran via the Striene to empty into the Meuse (Dutch Maas), the Menapii had lived during Caesar's time. Their Roman civitas appears to have ended near the Striene-Scheldt, and in their place were possibly new tribes such as the Frisiavones, Marsacii, Sturii, Canninefates and Batavians. The Batavians had their own civitas within Germania Inferior. So it is not clear if the Civitas Tungrorum reached to the North Sea, nor whether it reached to the old Meuse-Maas delta, as the later diocese of Liège did. But it is likely, in any case, that the civitas reached into the modern Netherlands province of North Brabant.
- To the northeast it appears that the Tungri's district reached into the northern part of the Netherlands province of Limburg, which is where the districts of the pagus Vellaus and the pagus Catualinus apparently were. It may even have stretched over the Meuse in places. On the other hand, in this direction also lay the Civitas Traianensis, inhabited by the Cugerni, and apparently also the Baetasii, which may have also stretched into this same region of the modern Netherlands.
- Directly to the east, proposals differ concerning the border with the province of the Ubii, the Colonia Aggripensis, with its capital in Cologne. It is sometimes suggested that the southern part of Dutch Limburg must also have been in the civitas. But it appears the Sunuci, were in the province of Cologne, and that they lived areas such as Valkenburg, Voeren and Aachen, that were later within the church diocese of Liège. So it has been proposed that the Meuse river was the border, and perhaps even Maastricht was not included. One proposal is that the civitas gained territory in Dutch Limburg already during late Roman times, for example when Germania Inferior was reorganised into Germania Secunda.

== Geography ==
The territory of the Tungri is divided into three distinct geographical areas.

- The north is a large sandy area known today as the Campine (Dutch Kempen). It was not highly fertile, or heavily populated. It contains marshy areas, and the water flows partly to the Scheldt in the west and partly towards the Meuse. In Latin this area came to be known as Toxandria, but in late Roman time it became almost empty of Romanized inhabitants, and was settled by incoming Franks.
- A band in the centre of the civitas is hilly, loess ground. This contains the modern regions known as the Hesbaye (Dutch Haspengouw), Hageland, and Condroz. It has historically always been more fertile and more heavily populated. It was here that Roman civilization held out against the invasions of the late empire, and it is therefore here that the frontier was set between Germanic languages and Romance languages, the same as it is today. (Some claim that this pattern was fixed already before Caesar, originally having been a border between Germanic and Celtic languages.)
- The south of the civitas is more heavily wooded and hilly and merges into the natural boundary of the Ardennes.

== Origins: the Tungri ==
Concerning the Tungri, the name appears for the first time only when this area is part of the Roman Empire. Some authors believe it represents a name used by new immigrants coming from the eastern side of the Rhine. On the other hand, Tacitus equated them to the same group of tribes who had been known as the Germani and had lived in the area in the time of the Gallic Wars of Julius Caesar, and been described by him in his famous Commentary. Tacitus claimed that "Tungri" was not their original name:-

The name Germany [Germania], on the other hand, they say, is modern and newly introduced, from the fact that the tribes which first crossed the Rhine and drove out the Gauls, and are now called Tungrians, were then called Germans [Germani]. Thus what was the name of a tribe [natio], and not of a race [gens], gradually prevailed, till all called themselves by this self-invented name of Germans [Germani], which the conquerors had first employed to inspire terror.

The Germani tribes which Caesar had earlier named in this region were the Eburones, the Condrusi, the Paemani (or Caemani), the Caeroesi, and the Segni. The biggest and most important tribe were the Eburones, and it is they who appear to have dominated all or most of modern-day Belgian and Dutch Limburg, with a territory probably covering all or most of the flat Campine (Dutch Kempen) northern part of this region, and stretching into neighbouring regions of the Netherlands, Wallonia and Germany. The other tribes are thought to have lived further south, in what is today Wallonia, or else just over the border in Germany – the Condrusi in the modern Condroz, near the Segni, and the Caeroesi in the Eifel forest region of Germany.

The term Germani for these tribes requires explanation in order to avoid confusion. Caesar also referred to other tribes living over the east of the Rhine as Germani, and he called that region Germania, considering it their homeland. He may have been the first to extend the term in this way, which has now influenced many modern languages. So he distinguished the Germani in the Belgic area as "Germani cisrhenani", and treated the other "Germani" as the ones living in their real homeland, which some Roman geographers came to refer to as Magna Germania.

Whether or not any of the Belgian Germani spoke a Germanic language in the modern sense is uncertain. The names of their leaders and their tribes for the most part appear to have Celtic origins, which is in fact also true of the neighbouring tribes across the Rhine in "Germania" at that time, such as the Tencteri and Usipetes. On the other hand, place-name analysis seems to show that a Germanic language was being spoken in this region by the second century BCE, and there are also signs of an older substrate language in the Belgic region. (See Nordwestblock.) So Celtic, while influential culturally, may never have been the main language of the area.

Apart from the Germani, the Atuatuci also probably lived in what would become the Civitas Tungrorum. Caesar treated them as a distinct people from the Germani although their ancestry was also in the east, because they were descended from remnants of the Cimbri. Because they had a fort on large hill, and their name may even mean "fort people" it is thought that the Aduatuci lived in hilly Wallonia, possibly near Namur. Ambiorix, one of the two kings of the Eburones, complained to Caesar that he had to pay tribute to the Aduatuci, and that his own son and nephew were kept as captive slaves by them. But once in revolt against the Romans, he rode first to the Aduatuci, and then to the Nervii, searching for allies.

The Aduatuci and the Germani (in the narrow sense) participated in an alliance of Belgic tribes against Caesar in 57 BCE. Before that battle, information from the Remi, a tribe allied with Rome, stated that the Germani (the Condrusi, the Eburones, the Caeraesi, and the Paemani; but not the Segni) had collectively promised, they thought, about 40,000 men. The Aduatuci had promised 19,000. In 54 BCE, after the defeat of this alliance in the Battle of the Sabis, the Eburones and the Aduatuci rebelled again in alliance with the Gaulish tribes to their south and west, the Treveri and Nervii.

The capital of the Eburones is named by Caesar as Aduatuca. It is possible that this is the same place as modern Tongeren (Latin Aduatuca Tungrorum), except that the term may simply mean "fortification". One reason for doubt is that Caesar seems to indicate that Aduatuca was near the centre of the Eburone territory, and that the main part of this territory lay between the Meuse (Dutch Maas) and the Rhine, while Tongeren lies entirely to the west of the Maas.

After some initial success, the revolt against Caesar failed, and he conquered the area. He states that he tried to annihilate "the race and name of the state of the Eburones", for their "crime" which triggered the revolt, of having killed his lieutenants Quintus Titurius Sabinus and Lucius Aurunculeius Cotta when they had demanded to be quartered amongst the Eburones for winter during a year with bad harvests. Ambiorix fled into the Ardennes, with some horse. Many others escaped towards the forests, morasses, and tidal islands of the coast.

The other king of the Eburones, Cativolcus, killed himself "with the juice of the yew-tree, of which there is a great abundance in Gaul and Germany". The name "Eburones" (like other similar Celtic-based tribal names around Europe) is based on the Celtic word for the yew tree, and this might also be true of the later Toxandri.

== Roman Empire ==
Under the Romans, for example in the time of Augustus, the Tungri civitas was at first considered to be a part of Gallia Belgica. Later, probably in the time of Diocletian, it split out, away from their Belgian neighbours to the west, the Menapii and Nervii, to join with the territories which lay along the militarized Rhine border and become part of Germania Inferior "Lower Germania", and still later this was reorganized to become Germania Secunda. Many of the tribal groups which inhabited the west bank of the Rhine were dominated by immigrants from the east bank. To the north of the Tungri, in the Rhine–Meuse–Scheldt delta in the modern Netherlands were the Batavians and Frisiavones and possibly still some of the Menapii who had been there in Caesar's time. To the northeast, in the bend of the Rhine, were the Cugerni, who were probably descended from a division of the Sicambri, and probably the Baetasi also. To the east of the Tungri were the Sunici and on the Rhine the Ubii, whose city was Cologne, the provincial capital. The Tungri, along with many of the tribal states of Germania Inferior, participated in the Revolt of the Batavi.

Tongeren was a major town on several notable east-west Roman routes including Amiens-Bavay-Tongeren-Maastricht-Heerlen-Cologne, which was a very important route, and Boulogne-Kortrijk-Tienen-Tongeren, which ran just to the south of the modern main road running Tienen-St Truiden-Borgloon-Tongeren, through the villages of Overhespen, Helshoven, and Bommershoven. The more fertile areas south of these roads were more heavily populated and more fully Romanized. In the sandy north of the Civitas, the so-called Campine (Dutch Kempen) was less fertile, and less populated.

Within the civitas Tungrorum, some information survives about sub-districts (pagi), each with apparent tribal names. Most of this information comes from military records, concerning units recruited from such areas. The civitas had at least three alae and four cohorts named after it, of which two cohorts were long stationed in northern England, near Hadrian's Wall, where they and other Germanic units were moved after the Batavian revolt.

- The first cohort is known from around ten different records, mostly connected to the Scottish border area, especially in Vindolanda.
- The second cohort is known from two inscriptions, one in Birrens (Roman Blatobulgium) and one in Castlesteads, both near the Scottish border.

The name of one of the Germani tribal groups has survived from Caesar's time until today, the Condrusi, who lived in the Condroz of Wallonia. Another survived into medieval times, the Caerosi who lived in the Eifel forest just over the border in modern Germany.

A new name in Roman times is Toxandria the district of the Toxandri, which appears to have been in the large part of the civitas containing the sandy Campine region in the north, but possibly overlapping into the country of the Nervii, because some Toxandri also appear in cohorts of the Nervian civitas to the west. As with the Tungri more generally, whose name also appears for the first time under the Romans, either this was a new Germanic tribe entering the region, or it has alternatively been suggested that it could be a Latin translation of the name Eburones, whose name had been annihilated by Caesar. Both names apparently refer to the yew tree (Latin taxus).

The pagus Catualinus apparently existed in or near Heel on the Meuse, which corresponds with Catvalium in the Tabula Peutingeriana map. The name appears to be linguistically Celtic.

The pagus Vellaus, is associated with the name of the forest of Veluwe in the Netherlands. Some soldiers from this pagus erected a monument to a goddess named Ricagambeda (apparently a Germanic name), while they were stationed in Birrens in Scotland, as part of the second cohort of the Civitas Tungrorum. Because modern Veluwe is north of the Rhine, and outside the territory of the Tungri, their levy into the military is either a case where a Germanic tribe was recruited from outside the borders, or else it relates to another Veluwe such as the Groote Peel national park between Eindhoven and Venlo. Their name has been compared with the name Vellaus, the name of a god found in some inscriptions.

(It has also been proposed that the Baetasi might have lived near Geetbets, on the Brabant-Limburg border, but it seems more likely that they lived in an area closer to the Rhine in modern Germany.)

Map of the Roman Empire and Magna Germania in the early second century

Already during the Gallic Wars of Caesar, tribes of Germanic people were raiding over the Rhine, and many were eventually settled there. As Tacitus wrote, "The Rhine bank itself is occupied by tribes unquestionably German,—the Vangiones, the Triboci, and the Nemetes. Nor do even the Ubii, though they have earned the distinction of being a Roman colony, and prefer to be called Agrippinenses, from the name of their founder, blush to own their origin." The tribes he mentions are all tribes mentioned by Caesar also, as having made attempts to cross the Rhine when he was in the area.

The Ubii, were in the north, the region of the Eburones, and became the people of the region of Cologne and Bonn during Roman imperial times. The other three tribes had been invaders on the upper Rhine, closer to modern Switzerland.

The Roman Empire proceeded to form two new cisrhenane provinces named "Germania" on the Gaulish, western, side of the Rhine.

- Germania superior was the more southern of the two provinces of cisrhenane Germania. It had its capital Mainz and included the area of modern Alsace, and the corner of Switzerland, Germany and France.
- Germania inferior ("lower Germany"), ran along the lower Rhine and had its capital on the German frontier in Cologne. It included modern Bonn, Neuss, Xanten, Nijmegen, and the Rhine–Meuse–Scheldt delta. Along the Rhine in Germania Inferior were not only the Ubii, but also other tribes who had crossed the Rhine into the empire – the Cugerni, thought to be a part of the Sugambri, and the Batavians, thought to descend from the Chatti. The origin of others such as the Marsacii, Frisiavones, Baetasii, and Sunuci is less certain, but they are all thought to be Germanic. At some point the Civitas Tungrorum, the district where the supposed original Germani had lived, became part of Germania Inferior.

So the two Roman provinces named Germania, both mainly on the west of the Rhine, gave an official form to the concept of germani cisrhenani.

== The end of the era ==
As the empire grew older, the pressure from Germanic tribes crossing the Rhine became greater, especially in areas closest to the Rhine. The northern part of the Civitas Tungrorum became depopulated, and was then settled by the Salian Franks, who referred to this territory by its old name of Toxandria. The area bordering the Civitas Tungrorum on the east, also along the Rhine, became the territory of the Ripuarian Franks. Eventually, the whole of the area of the old civitas became the central area of occupation of the Salian Franks. It was from here that their Merovingian and Carolingian dynasties proceeded to conquer a large part of Western Europe.

As mentioned above, one way in which the old civitas survived was by its medieval Christian diocese, the diocese of Liège, although its seat changed from Tongeren to Maastricht and later to Liège. This diocese was however reduced greatly in the 16th century.

Apart from historical records such as those discussed above, the old name of the Tungri now survives only in place names such as Tongeren and Tongerloo.

== Bibliography ==
- Alberts, Wybe J. (1974). Geschiedenis van de beide Limburgen: Tot 1632 (in Dutch). Van Gorcum. ISBN 978-90-232-0999-7.
- Byvanck, A. W. (1943), Nederland in Den Romeinschen Tijd, vol. 1, Brill
- Lamarcq, Danny; Rogge, Marc (1996), De Taalgrens: Van de oude tot de nieuwe Belgen, Davidsfonds
- Nouwen, Robert (1997). Tongeren en het land van de Tungri (31 v. Chr. - 284 n. Chr.) (PDF). Leeuwarden: Eisma. ISBN 90-74252-71-0. OCLC 782280709.
- Raepsaet, Georges (2013). "L'ethnogenèse de la civitas Tungrorum et la formation de la Province de Germanie". L'Antiquité Classique. 82 (1): 111–148. doi:10.3406/antiq.2013.3829. ISSN 0770-2817.
- Raepsaet-Charlier, Marie-Thérèse (1994). "La cité des Tongres sous le Haut-Empire. Problèmes de géographie historique". Bonner Jahrbücher. 194: 43–59.
- Raepsaet-Charlier, Marie-Thérèse; Vanderhoeven, Alain (2004). "Tongres au Bas-Empire romain". Supplément à la Revue archéologique du centre de la France. 25 (1): 51–73.
- Roymans, Nico (2004). Ethnic Identity and Imperial Power: The Batavians in the Early Roman Empire. Amsterdam University Press. ISBN 978-90-5356-705-0.
- Vanderhoeven, Alain; Vanderhoeven, Michel (2004). "Confrontation in Archaeology: Aspects of Roman Military in Tongeren". In Vermeulen, Frank; Sas, Kathy; Dhaeze, Wouter (eds.). Archaeology in Confrontation: Aspects of Roman Military Presence in the Northwest : Studies in Honour of Prof. Em. Hugo Thoen. Academia Press. ISBN 978-9038205786.
- Vanvinckenroye, Willy (2001). "Über Atuatuca, Cäsar und Ambiorix". In Lodewijckx, Marc (ed.). Belgian Archaeology in a European Setting. Vol. 2. Leuven University Press. pp. 63–66. ISBN 9789058671677.
- Wightman, Edith M. (1985). Gallia Belgica. University of California Press. ISBN 978-0-520-05297-0.
