= Tungri =

Roman era people of the Liège region

The Tungri (or Tongri, or Tungrians) were a tribe, or group of tribes, who lived in the Belgic part of Gaul, during the times of the Roman Empire. Within the Roman Empire, their territory was called the Civitas Tungrorum. They were described by Tacitus as being the same people who were first called "Germani" (Germanic), meaning that all other tribes who were later referred to this way, including those in Germania east of the river Rhine, were named after them. More specifically, Tacitus was thereby equating the Tungri with the "Germani Cisrhenani" described generations earlier by Julius Caesar.

Their name is the source of several place names in Belgium, Germany and the Netherlands, including Tongeren, which was the capital of their Roman era province, the civitas Tungrorum, and also places such as Tongerlo Abbey, and Tongelre.

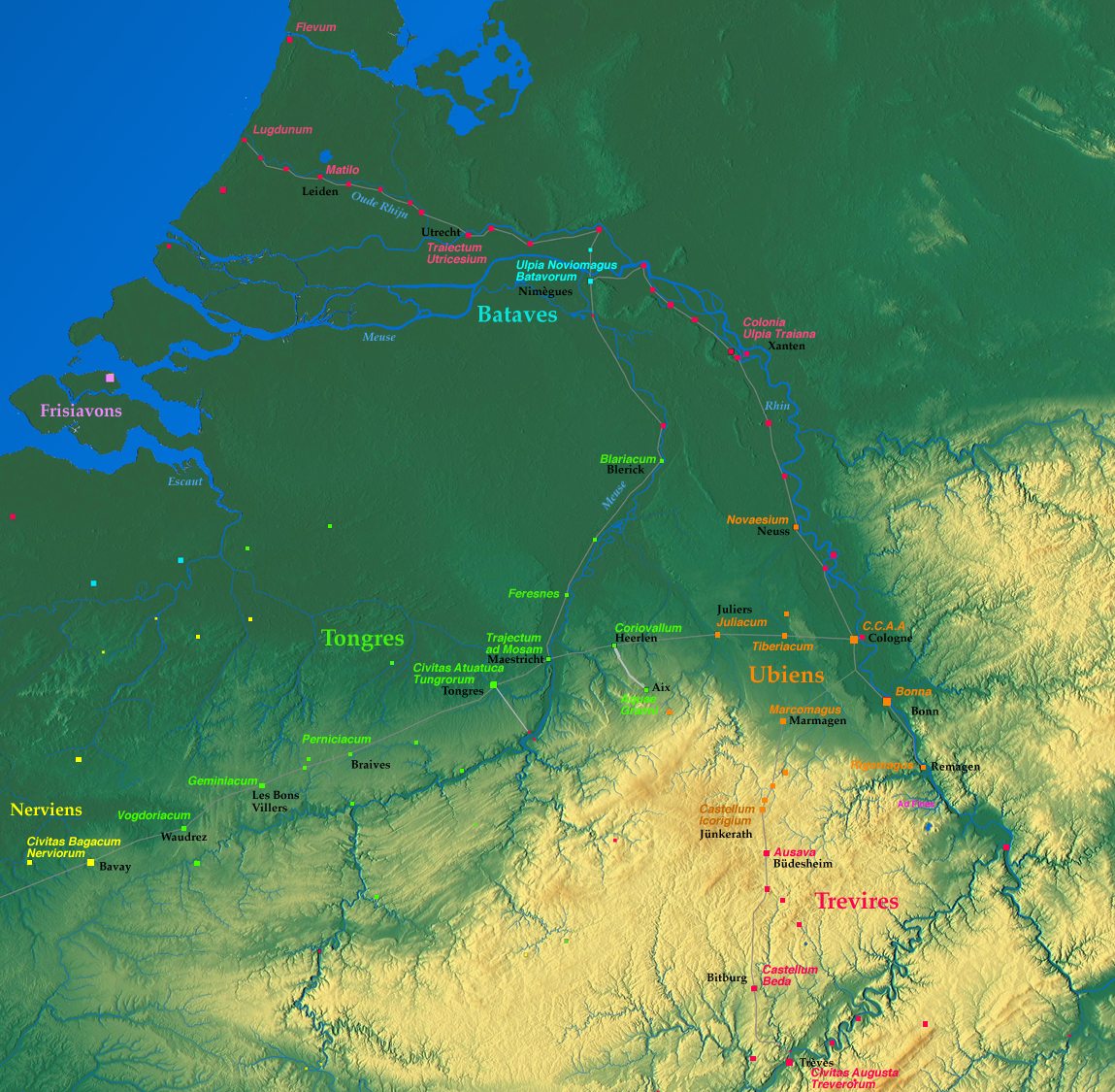
The Roman province of Germania Inferior, showing Atuatuca, modern Tongeren, the capital of the Tungri (Tongres). Places associated with the Tungri are in bright green. It was on the road between Amiens and Cologne on the Rhine Limes. The Ubii (in orange) were originally from the other side of the river Rhine, but moved into part of the territory of the Eburones.

== Origins ==
In a comment in his book Germania, Tacitus remarks that Germani was the original tribal name of the Tungri with whom the Gauls were in contact; among the Gauls the term Germani came to be widely applied. The sentence has been the subject of frequent debate about the exact details. Discussing the names of Germanic peoples or races (gentis appellationes), Tacitus noted that some names were speculated to be true and ancient, but "Germania" was known by him to be a new term, invented when the term Germani came to be applied more widely:

the term "Germania" is recent and newly in use, because those who first crossed the Rhine and expelled the Gauls, now called the Tungri, were then called Germani. Thus the name of the nation (natio), not the people (gens), gradually prevailed, so that all [east of the Rhine] came to be referred to with this artificial term Germani.

According to Tacitus then, first the victor, the Tungri, used this term to refer to other peoples from the homeland east of the Rhine, which would thus come to be called "Germania". They did this "ob metum" which could mean "to inspire fear" or "out of fear". In any case, soon other people from Germania used this term themselves.

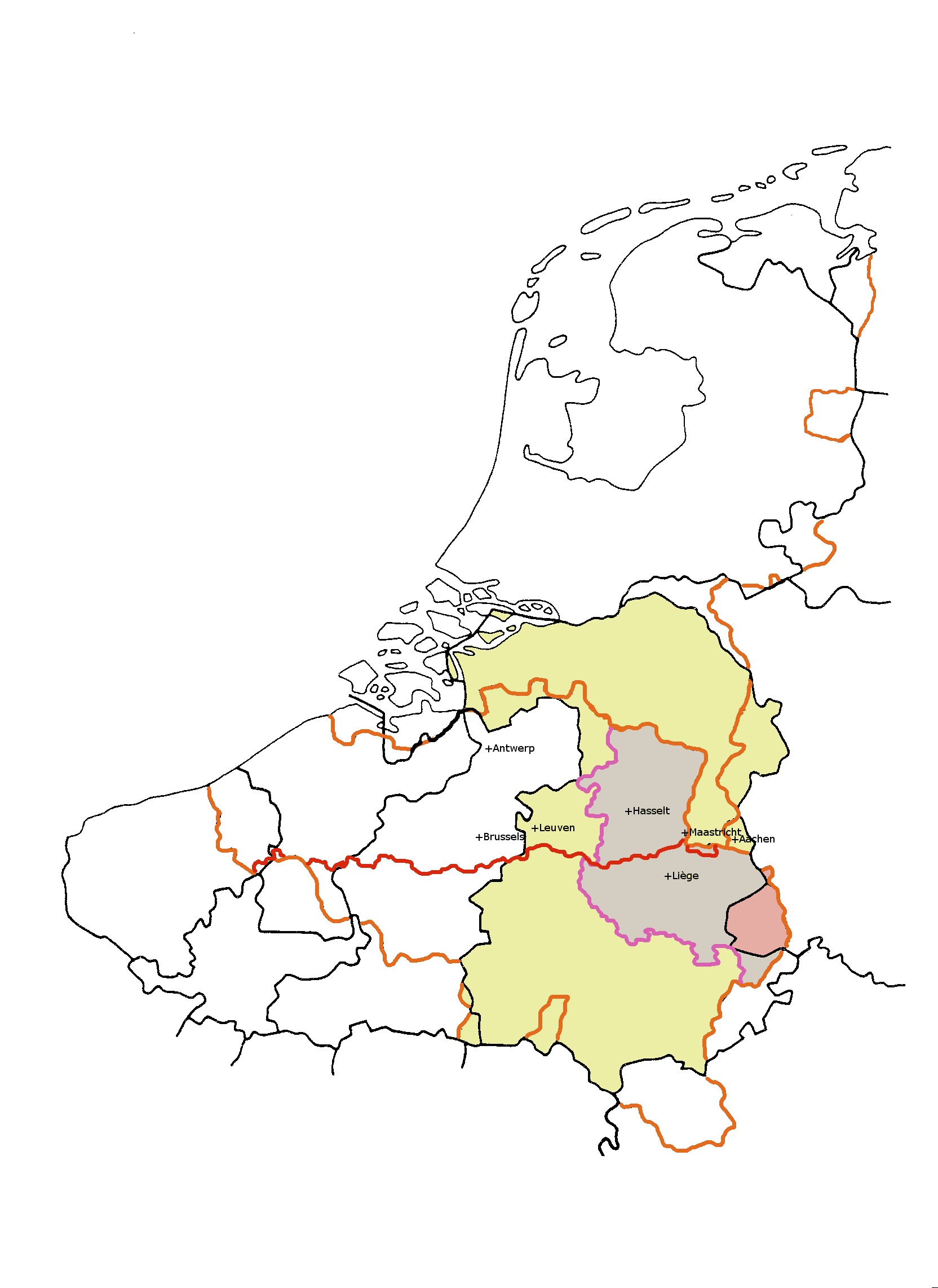
The pre-1559 Diocese of Liège (yellow) which evolved from the Civitas Tungrorum, and the modern Belgian provinces of Liège and Limburg with a red line between them along the modern Dutch-French language border. Orange lines are modern national borders. Before the Roman period, the territory of the Germani Cisrhenani stretched to Cologne.

Corresponding to this, some generations earlier, Julius Caesar, on the other hand, did not mention the Tungri but stated that the Condrusi, the Eburones, the Caeroesi and the Paemani, living in the same approximate area as the later Tungri, were "called by the common name of Germani" and had settled in Gaul already before the Cimbrian War (113-101 BCE), having come from Germany east of the Rhine. Caesar cited them as providing one collective contribution of men to the Belgic revolt against him within which the Eburones were the most important. The Eburones, who apparently lived as far east as Cologne, were led by Ambiorix and Cativolcus. Also neighbouring these tribes where the Aduatuci, whose origin Caesar describes more specifically as having descended from the Cimbri and Teutones, against whom the Germani had been the only tribe in Gaul to successfully defend themselves. Their descendants, if there were any, presumably lived amongst the Tungri.

Already during the campaign of Caesar, the Tencteri and Usipetes crossed the Rhine for cattle raids on the territories of the Menapii, the Eburones and the Condrusi, giving Caesar an excuse for new military intervention in the area. He pursued them back over the Rhine where they were helped by the Sicambri. Later, Caesar himself encouraged the Sicambri to cross the Rhine into the territory of the Eburones, seeking to plunder the lands of the people whose fortress he had just taken. These tribes who crossed the Rhine and became part of Roman Germania Inferior were themselves apparently heavily influenced by Gaulish culture, some using Gaulish personal names or Gaulish tribal names.

Later, as the area became part of the Roman Empire, some of these tribes from over the Rhine, including the Sicambri and the Ubii, were forced by Tiberius to settle in the northeast of Gaul. Romanized provinces with tribal names developed from the merging of incoming groups with people who had lived there before Caesar. This is a likely origin of both the Tungri and the other tribal groups of Germania Inferior. The Roman civitas of the Tungri is smaller than the area which Caesar ascribed to the earlier Germani Cisrhenani, with the areas near the Rhine governed as a military frontier, and populated at least partly with soldiers and immigrants from the other side of the Rhine.

The exact history of each of the populations is not known although the areas nearer to the Rhine appear to have had larger-scale immigration, and the Tungri were suspected, according to Tacitus, of having been less influenced in their makeup by that process. Smaller tribal groups such as the Condrusi (one of the Germani tribes mentioned by Caesar) and the Texuandri (perhaps the same as the Eburones) continued to exist as recognized groups for the administrative purpose of mustering troops. To the north of the Tungri, in the Rhine-Maas delta, were the Batavians, a similarly new formation, apparently made up of incoming Chatti, with a possible contribution from the Eburones. To the northeast of the Tungri, near the Rhine, were the Cugerni, who are thought to be Sicambri, and then, around the area of Cologne and Bonn, the Ubii were settled.

== Location ==
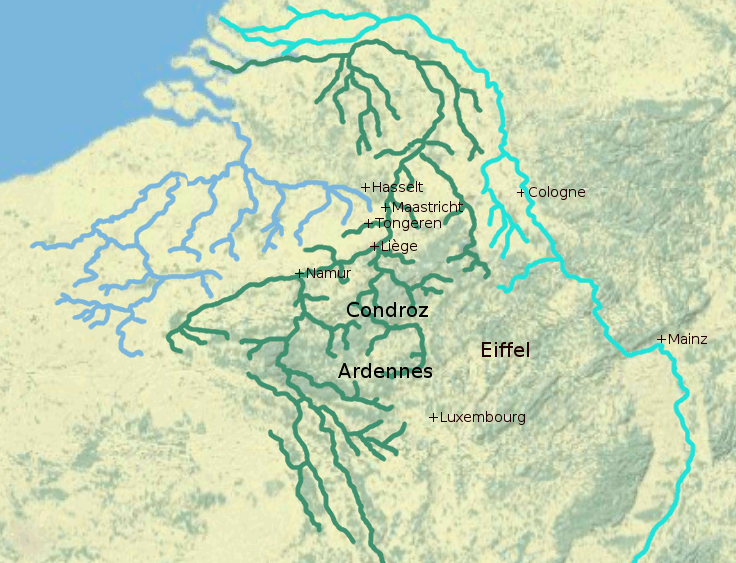
Map showing the three rivers relevant to discussions about the position where the Tungri lived, the Scheldt, the Maas and the Rhine. They lived between the Scheldt and Rhine, with their capital in Tongeren. In the south, their territory included the Condroz. In the north, it stretched into the flat Campine region.

Pliny the Elder is the first writer to mention the Tungri as citizens of Roman Gallia Belgica. In his Natural History, he notes that their region...

...has a spring of great renown, which sparkles as it bursts forth with bubbles innumerable, and has a certain ferruginous taste, only to be perceived after it has been drunk. This water is strongly purgative, is curative of tertian fevers, and disperses urinary calculi: upon the application of fire it assumes a turbid appearance, and finally turns red

It has been suggested that this refers to the well-known waters of Spa in the province of Liège, or else to waters found at Tongeren, which are suitably iron-bearing, and today referred to as the "Plinius bron".

Apart from Tongeren the capital, both Pliny and Ptolemy's Geography are unclear concerning the exact boundaries of the Tungri's country but are understood as placing it east of the Scheldt, and to the north of the Arduenna Silva (Forest of Ardennes), somewhere near the middle and lower valley of the Mosa (Meuse).

The Eburones had a fort called Atuatuca (or Aduatuca). Caesar reported that the word Atuatuca meant a fortress. Under Roman occupation, a new city Aduatuca Tungrorum, modern Tongeren in the Limburg province of Belgium, became the capital city of the region.

Under the Romans, the Tungri civitas was first a part of Gallia Belgica, and later split out to join the territories of the Ubii to the southeast, and the Cugerni, who are generally equated with being descended from the Sicambri, to the northeast, and become part of Germania Inferior, which still later evolved into Germania Secunda. In other directions, their neighbours in Roman times were the Belgic Nervii on the west and the Remi and Treveri to the south, all of which were tribes who had been in those regions since before Caesar's campaign.

== Part of the empire ==
Tacitus in his Histories notes two cohorts of Tungri in the civil war of 69 AD.

The Tungri were mentioned in the Notitia Dignitatum, an early fifth-century document, in which every military and governmental post in the late Roman Empire was transcribed. The document mentions the Tribune of the First Cohort of Tungri stationed at Vercovicium (Housesteads, Northumberland) on Hadrian's Wall where it was located from 205/208.

The 2nd Cohort of Tungrians, also a milliaria equitata (nominally 1000 men strong), was stationed at Birrens fort from 159 to about 184.

Cohors IV Tungrorum was based in Abusina during the second century.

Tausius, the Roman soldier who killed the emperor Pertinax, was a Tungrian.

== Religion ==
The goddess Vihansa (probably meaning 'holy deity') is mentioned on a bronze tablet found near Tongeren and engraved by a centurion dedicating his shield and spear to the deity.

== See also ==
- List of Germanic tribes
