= Battle of the Sabis =

Battle between Caesar and the Belgae tribes, part of Caesar's Gallic Wars (57 BC)

Coordinates: 50°14′0″N 3°26′30″E

- Part of the Gallic Wars and the Roman–Germanic Wars
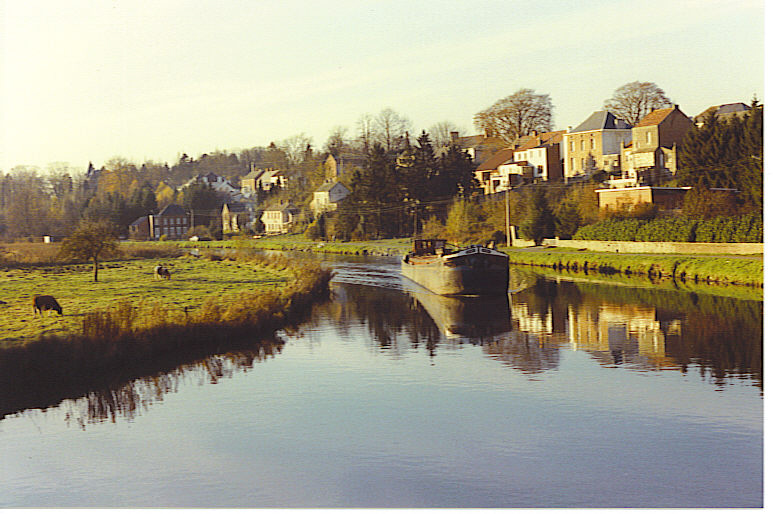
- The river Sambre
Date	57 BC
Location	Gaul
Result	Roman victory

Belligerents
Roman Republic	Nervii; Viromandui; Atrebates; Aduatuci

Commanders and leaders
Julius Caesar	Boduognatus

Units involved
Legions: Legio VII; Legio VIII; Legio IX; Legio X; Legio XI; Legio XII; Legio XIII; Legio XIV; Auxiliary: Light infantry; Allied forces: Allied cavalry	The warriors of the: Nervii; Atrebates; Viromandui; Atuatuci

Strength
30,000–45,000 men (8 legions plus auxiliaries and allies)	75,000 warriors

Casualties and losses
Unknown	59,500

The Battle of the Sabis also (arguably erroneously) known as the Battle of the Sambre or the Battle against the Nervians (or Nervii) was fought in 57 BC near modern Saulzoir in Northern France. At the River Sabis a Roman army under the command of Gaius Julius Caesar fought an association of Belgae tribes, principally the Nervii. Caesar was surprised and nearly defeated by a Belgae surprise attack. According to Caesar's commentaries, a combination of determined defence, skilled generalship, and the timely arrival of reinforcements allowed the Romans to turn the Belgae ambush into a Roman victory. Few primary sources describe the battle in detail, with most information coming from Caesar's own report on the battle from his book, Commentarii de Bello Gallico. Little is therefore known about the Nervii perspective on the battle.

== Prelude ==
During the winter of 58–57 BC rumours came to Caesar's ears that the Belgae tribes were forming a union because they feared possible Roman interference in their affairs. The union included the Bellovaci, Suessiones, Nervii, Atrebates, Ambiani, Morini, Menapii, Caleti, Veliocasses, Viromandui, Aduatuci, Condrusi, Eburones, Caeroesi, and Paemani tribes, and was under the leadership of Galba, a king of the Suessiones. These reports provided Caesar with a good pretext for conquering more than Gaul "itself", and for this, he raised two legions in Cisalpine Gaul (XIII and XIV) and convinced the Remi tribe to side with him.

In response, the other Belgae and Celtic tribes had attacked Bibrax (the oppidum of the Remi, situated near the river Aisne). Caesar countered by defending the oppidum and winning an action at the Aisne. In the face of this and because of shortage of provisions, the union collapsed and tribal armies retreated to their own lands, with the agreed future intention of coming to the support of any tribe invaded by the Romans. Caesar continued his advance and tribes surrendered one by one. However, four tribes, the Nervii, the Atrebates, the Aduatuci, and the Viromandui refused to submit.

The Ambiani told Caesar that the Nervii were the most hostile of the Belgae to Roman rule. A fierce and brave tribe, they did not allow the import of luxury items as they believed these had a corrupting effect and probably feared Roman influence. They had no intention of entering peace negotiations with the Romans. Caesar would move on them next.

== Forces ==
As with all ancient battles, estimates of the forces available to both sides will always be a matter of some speculation. A Roman legion during this era had a theoretical strength of some 4,800 fighting men with additional auxiliary forces (usually skirmishers and cavalry). Eight Roman legions plus an unknown number of auxiliary (skirmishers: archers, slingers and javelinmen) and allied cavalry are recorded to have taken part in the battle. It is not known if the legions were at full strength, but a reasonable estimate for Caesar's army might be in the range of 30,000–45,000 fighting men (including skirmishers and cavalry). The 30,000–45,000 range does not include non-combatants, although, in this case, they participated in the fighting during the final phase of the battle. A legion was usually accompanied by some 1,200 non-combatants (theoretically) so their numbers could have been 9,000-10,000 men.

Caesar claims he had earlier received intelligence from the Remi that the various tribes of the Belgae had promised to contribute a total of 300,000 fighting men. According to Caesar the Remi estimates of the men promised by the four tribes now left to oppose Caesar were: 50,000 Nervii, 15,000 Atrebates, 10,000 Veromandui and 19,000 Aduatuci. If these figures were reliable it would mean that Caesar was immediately faced with a maximum of 75,000 men, as the Aduatuci were still en route. Promises are not always kept so it is probable the actual number was smaller than this, though still high enough to outnumber the legionaries.

=== Order of battle ===
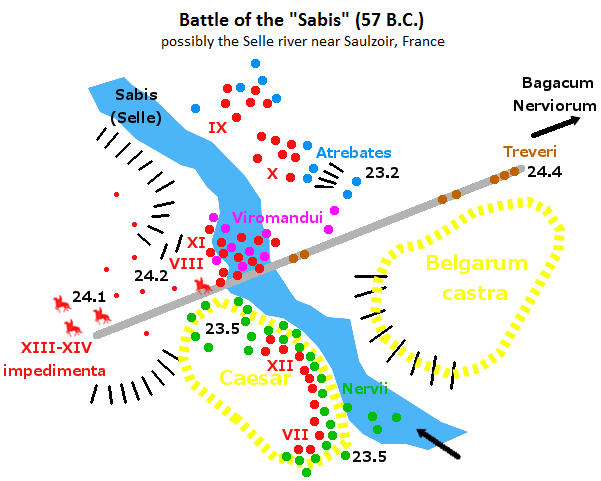
Battlefield if the "Sabis" matches the River Selle.

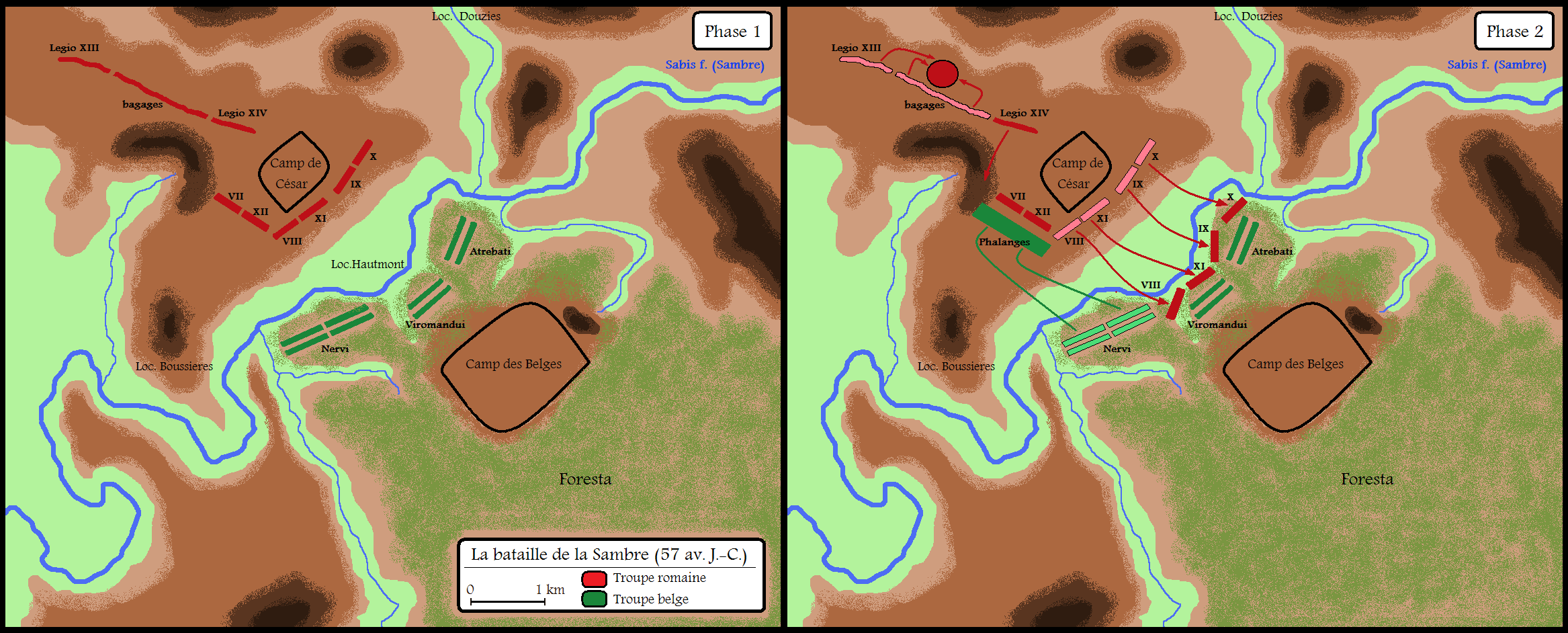
Battlefield if the "Sabis" matches the Sambre.

Roman Republic – Julius Caesar's eight legions: VII, VIII, IX Triumphalis, X Equestris, XI, XII Fulminata, XIII, XIV – auxiliaries: slingers, archers, javelinmen and cavalry. The IX and X legions formed the left flank, the VIII and the XI were in the centre, and the VII and XII were on the right.

The Belgae attacked with the Atrebates forming the right wing, the Viromandui in the centre, and the Nervi on the left.

Traditionally it was believed that the battle was fought on the banks of the river Sambre, near modern Aulnoye-Aymeries, but in 1955 Turquin showed that it was fought on the west bank of the river Selle, near modern Saulzoir.

== Before the battle ==
Caesar's legions had been marching in Nervian territory for three days, following an ancient road. He learnt from prisoners that the Belgae were massing on the far side of the River Sabis, which was about 10 miles (16 km) ahead. The Nervii had persuaded the Atrebates and the Veromandui to support them. The Aduatuci were marching to join them, but they did not arrive in time to take part in the battle. Their non-combatants had moved to a safe area screened by marshes, where an army could not approach. The Belgae had made their preparations and were now waiting for the Romans.

Caesar sent forward experienced scouts to choose the next campsite.

He learnt from prisoners taken later that sympathisers in the ragtag of surrendered Belgae and other Gauls travelling with the army had gone to the Nervii and reported the disposition of his column. They reported that the individual legionary baggage trains were interspersed between the legions and that it would be easy to cut off the leading legion from the rest and destroy it before any support could reach it. It was believed this would intimidate the Romans into withdrawing. The Nervii, having traditionally always relied on infantry rather than cavalry, had over the years developed a technique of building dense, impenetrable hedges of briars and thorns set between young trees as a defence against the raids of surrounding tribes. These would obstruct Caesar's advance and help the attack. It was agreed that the signal for an attack was to be the appearance of the baggage train behind the first legion. In doing this, the Nervii were intending to use what is recognisable today as the modern army doctrine of force concentration. As will be seen, their plan would be frustrated by Caesar.

== Battle ==
The campsite was to be laid out on a hill which gently sloped down to the river. On the other side of the river there was another hill directly opposite, similarly sloping. The top of that hill was densely wooded but the lower part was open and sloped down to the river over a distance of 200 paces (roughly 300 metres (330 yd)). The enemy was concealed inside the woods, but a few cavalry pickets could be seen in the open area by the river. The river was very wide, but only about three feet (one metre) deep.

At some point on his march to the Sabis, Caesar reorganised the column and reverted to his usual tactic of leading his forces with six legions in light marching order. Behind them was the baggage column of the entire army, followed by the newly recruited legions, XIII and XIV. Caesar does not say whether this change was fortuitous or was made in response to the intelligence received. While Caesar's force began to set up camp on the slope running down to the river, his cavalry, together with slingers and archers, was ordered to cross the river to reconnoiter. This developed into a skirmish with the few troops of Belgic cavalry that had been observed on the far side. Caesar describes the enemy cavalry as sallying repeatedly from the woods at the top of the hill and says his cavalry did not dare follow them in when they retreated. He does not elaborate further so it will never be known if the Nervii were trying to entice the skirmishers onto their hidden position or holding them in play on the slopes in preparation for the planned rush.

Meanwhile, the legions had started arriving at the camp site and began to build its fortifications. The Belgae, waiting for the baggage train to appear, gradually found themselves faced with not one legion, but six. Their plan of piecemeal destruction had to be abandoned, but they must have believed their numbers more than adequate to deal with their enemy.

=== Ambush ===
As the Roman baggage train came into view, the Belgic force suddenly rushed out of the trees and surprised their opponents, overwhelming the Roman cavalry. They crossed the shallow river at full speed and charged up the hill against the legions setting up camp, giving them no time to get into battle formation. It seemed to Caesar that the Nervii came on with incredible speed, all at once pouring out of the trees, charging across the river and overrunning his legionaries.

Taken by surprise, Caesar had to rapidly give orders to sound the alarm both by raising the battle-standard and by trumpet, get his men away from construction work, recall the wood-cutting parties, and try to get his legions into some semblance of order. There was very little time and much had to be left undone. Two things, though, saved the legions from being immediately routed—firstly, the knowledge and experience of the soldiers (which meant that they could decide for themselves what to do without waiting for orders) and secondly, Caesar had previously ordered all legion commanders to stay with their legions during the setting up of the camp.

Caesar went wherever he was needed, giving only essential orders and eventually found himself on the left wing with Legion X. Seeing that the enemy were within range of the Romans he gave the order to hurl a volley of pilae. Going to another part of the field, he found his men already fighting. The men had run from their building tasks to fall into ranks but many did not even have time to put on their helmets or take the covers off their shields. The legionaries had no opportunity to group with their own cohorts and instead congregated around the first friendly standard they saw. Caesar states that the hedges were a considerable obstruction to his men during the battle, although he does not specify their locations on the field, but the woody hilltop is the one place we can infer their presence.

The soldiers of legions X Equestris and IX Triumphalis on the left flank, having thrown their pila at their Atrebates opponents, charged. They threw the enemy back and drove them into the river, killing many. The Romans crossed the river and found themselves on disadvantageous or uneven ground, but although the Atrebates regrouped and launched a counter-attack, the Romans put them to flight a second time. Further along, in the centre, two legions, XI and VIII, having checked the Viromandui with whom they were engaged, pushed them from the higher ground into the river.

However, as these four legions pushed their opponents back, the front and left of the camp was left undefended and a gap opened up in the Roman line. A compact column of Nervii under Boduognatus (the overall commander of the Belgae) rushed through the opening. Part of the column turned to encircle the two legions holding the right flank; the rest continued upwards to attack the higher part of the camp.

=== Crisis ===
Meanwhile, the routed Roman cavalry and skirmishers were just straggling into camp when they found themselves face to face with the Nervii – they ran again. Camp followers further up the hill by the camp's back gate had observed the success of the Romans at the river and came down in the hope of plunder, but noticed the Nervii in the camp and also ran. People accompanying the baggage train just arriving were horrified at the sight before them and panicked as well. Even the usually-dependable Treveri cavalry arriving to support the Romans looked at the seemingly hopeless situation and promptly turned for home to report the disaster.

After encouraging Legion X Caesar went to the right wing. The situation seemed desperate. He could see that the men of XII Victrix were crammed so closely together into one mass by their standards that they could not fight effectively. All (six) centurions of the fourth cohort were dead, its standard bearer killed, and the standard missing. Of the remaining cohorts, almost all the centurions were either wounded or killed; Baculus, the legion's primipilus, a fine soldier, had received so many minor and serious wounds that he could barely stand. The Nervii were attacking vigorously from lower ground and pressing at the front and both flanks. Caesar could see some men were shirking and trying to get to the rear; others were slowly ceasing effective resistance. There were no reserves. This was the crisis-point. He took a shield from a soldier at the rear and went to the first line. Calling his centurions by name, he ordered them to have the soldiers advance (signa inferre) and the maniples open up and extend. As he tells it, his arrival brought hope and boosted the soldiers’ morale. Every man was now keen to do well in front of his general. As a result, the enemy assault was checked slightly.

=== Recovery ===
Caesar saw that Legion VII nearby was also hard-pressed. He ordered the tribunes to redeploy the two legions to gradually join and fight back to back. This further increased his men's confidence. By now, the legions escorting the baggage, having received a report of the action, had come on at double pace and the enemy could see them coming over the hill above the camp. Legion X, under legate Labienus, had overcome the Atrebates, crossed the river, and defeated the Belgic reserves. Now they seized the Belgic camp on the wooded hill. From the higher ground, Labienus could see that Caesar's right wing was in serious trouble. He ordered his men back across the river to attack the Nervii from the rear.

Soon Legions XIII and XIV joined the fight. Caesar does not detail their actions, but they probably cleared the camp (as it was their nearest target) and went to the right to relieve the pressure on Legions XII and VII. This, coupled with the return of Legion X, transformed the situation. Seeing the position begin to stabilise, cavalry and skirmishers took heart and, keen to wipe out their earlier shame, started to fight in earnest. The camp followers joined in now that they could see their enemy's dismay. The entire Roman force was now fully committed.

At this point of the battle it is clear that Caesar's opposition had little hope of survival. They were being pushed closer and closer into a dense pack that was being surrounded by Caesar's men who were using projectile weapons to pick off their remaining forces. Using peltasts (a light infantry) equipped with slings and javelins, and with the help of archers, they unleashed a barrage of missiles at the closely packed Nervii. The last of them fought with ferocity and courage for they were continuing to retaliate with their spears and catching the Romans javelins and throwing them back at them. The Nervii hadn't used any other projectile type weapon except for spears. The Nervii warriors fought to the last, standing on the bodies of their slain comrades, and throwing the Romans’ own spears back at them. Eventually the few remaining Nervii broke and fled the field.

Caesar's opinion of the Nervii was that they had shown great fighting spirit in carrying an attack forward so vigorously on to difficult ground and in continuing to fight stubbornly when the tide of battle turned irretrievably against them. Caesar talks of a grimly inspiring image of the last of the Nervii who were atop a mound of corpses of their own warriors and shouting in defiance towards the Romans, fighting till their last breath. He goes on to say that they had outstanding courage, for they launched a surprise attack, crossed a river up its banks, then rushed on to attack all with a fighting spirit. He glorifies his victory by stating how well his army did without having to be ordered to launch a counter-attack. It is probable that his soldiers were experienced veterans who were able to hold off their onslaught. He evidently mitigates his losses by not mentioning the Roman casualties, or conceding that they were in serious danger of defeat, as appears to have been the case. While Caesar appears to give a relatively frank account of the course of the battle, in The Conquest of Gaul, this remains one of the only primary sources. And since it was written by Caesar, much is unknown of the Nervii's perspective, such as the extent to which Boduognatus planned the attack and directed his forces during the battle.

== Casualties ==
The older men of the Nervii, described by Caesar as “senators”, came out of their hiding place in the marshland and surrendered. They said that their council had been reduced from 600 men to three and that of 60,000 fighting men there were barely 500 left. It is not entirely clear if this is a figure for the dead or if it includes wounded, nor is it clear if these are solely Nervii casualties or if the figure includes their allies. Caesar states that he spared the Nervii and ordered the surrounding tribes not to take advantage of their weakness.

Caesar gives no indication of his own casualties.

== Aftermath ==
The Aduatuci turned for home as soon as they heard about the defeat. They were subsequently defeated by Caesar and some 53,000 of them sold into slavery.

The Veneti, the Unelli, the Osismii, the Curiosolitae, the Sesuvii, the Aulerci and the Rhedones were all brought under Roman control following the battle.

In 54 BC Ambiorix persuaded the Nervii to join the Eburones after the latter had destroyed a legion and five cohorts under Sabinus and Cotta during the Ambiorix's revolt.

During Vercingetorix's revolt (52 BC) the Nervii were only asked to supply 5,000 men to the forces raised by a confederation of over forty tribes.

== Sources ==
- Caesar, C. Julius. The Gallic War. Trans. Carolyn Hammond. New York: Oxford University Press, 1996.
- Caesar, The Life of a Colossus, Adrian Goldsworthy, Weidenfeld & Nicolson, Orion Books Ltd, 2007.

== Literature ==
- Delbrück, Hans. History of the Art of War Vol I. ISBN 978-0-8032-6584-4
- Pierre Turquin, "La Bataille de la Selle (du Sabis) en l' An 57 avant J.-C." in Les Études Classiques 23/2 (1955), 113-156
