= Condrusi =

Germanic-Belgic tribe

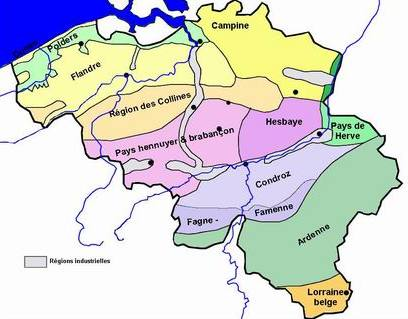
A modern geographical definition of Condroz is shown on this map of Belgium. It is thought to correspond roughly to the area where the Condrusi lived.

The Condrusi were an ancient Belgic-Germanic tribe dwelling in what is now eastern Belgium during the Gallic Wars (58–50 BC) and the Roman period. Caesar described them as part of the Germani Cisrhenani, and as with other peoples in that category, the language they spoke is unclear. Their tribal name is probably of Celtic origin. Like other Germani Cisrhenani tribes, it is possible that their old Germanic endonym came to be abandoned after a tribal reorganization, that they received their names from their Celtic neighbours, or else that they were fully or partially assimilated into Celtic culture at the time of the Roman invasion of the region in 57 BC.

== Name ==
They are mentioned as the Condrusi by Caesar (mid-1st c. BC), and as the Condurses by Orosius (early 5th century AD).

The meaning of the name Condrusi remains unclear. The prefix is most likely the Gaulish con-/com- ('with, together, as well') and the element -drūs- is also generally regarded as Celtic, although its meaning is unknown.

The Condroz region is attested as the Pagus Condrustis in an inscription dated 150–160 AD, and as the pagus Condrustus in medieval documents, and it is named after the Germanic tribe.

== Language and culture ==
Whether the Condrusi actually spoke a Germanic language remains uncertain. From their tribal name, we know that they were influenced by Celtic languages.

Contemporary reports by Julius Caesar (who classify them as Germani Cisrhenani) and Tacitus (who describes the Germani Cisrhenani as the first called Germani) state that they were also heavily influenced by Germanic peoples on the east of the Rhine river.

== Geography ==
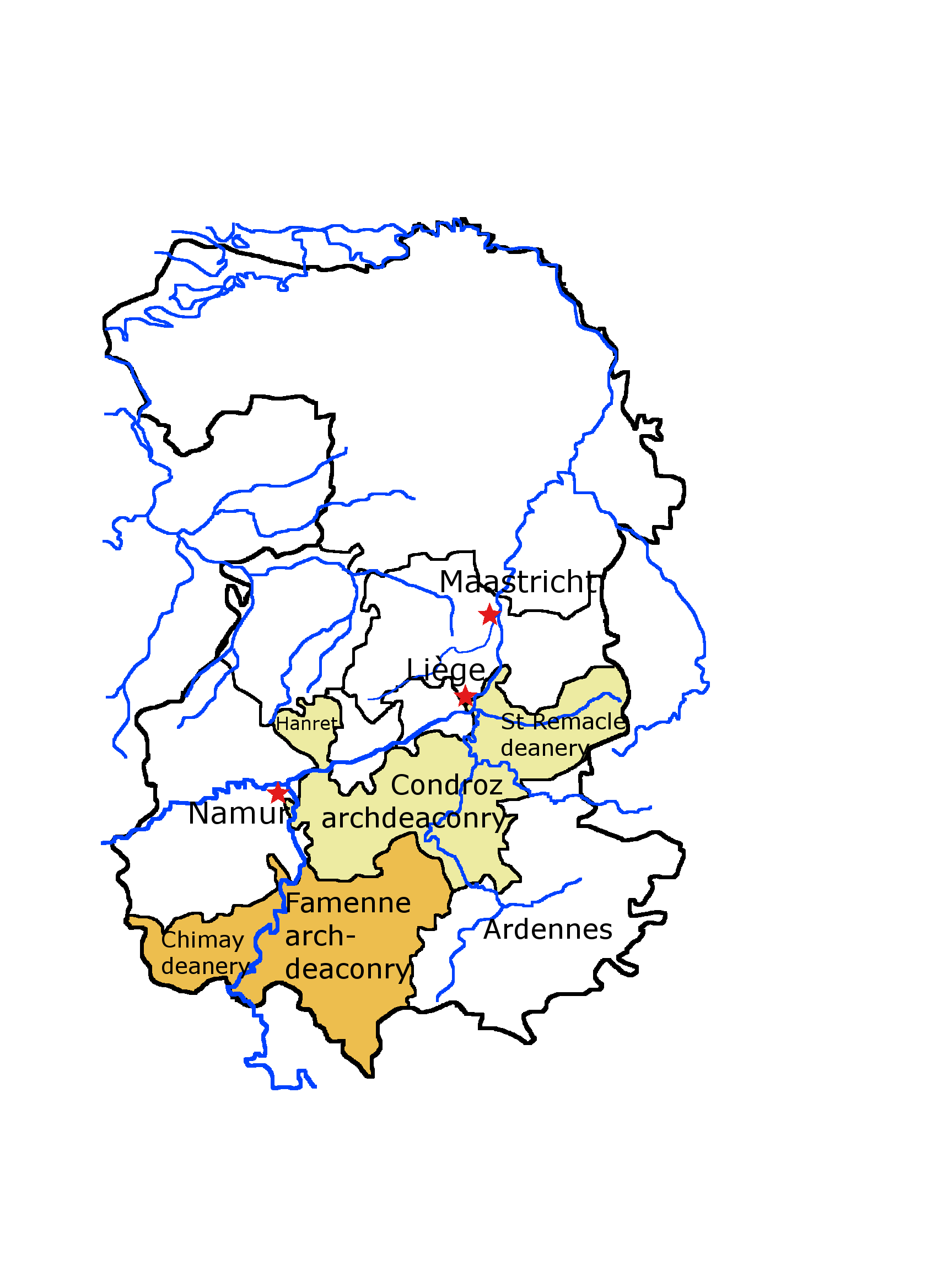
Late medieval Catholic archdeaconries of Condroz (yellow) and Famenne (orange).

The Condrusi probably dwelt in the Condroz region, an area of foothills situated northwest of the Ardennes, south and west of the Meuse, southwest of Liège and southeast of Namur. Like the Segni, their territory was located between that of the Treveri and Eburones. At the time of Caesar's conquest of the region in the mid-1st century BC, they lived as clients of the Treveri. During the Roman period, the Pagus Condrustis was one of the subdivisions of the civitas Tungrorum, founded c. 10 BC as a Roman military base.

The oldest known definitions of the medieval pagus of Condroz also included the region of neighbouring Famenne. Contrary to the late medieval archdeaconries of Condroz and Fammene, the early medieval pagus Condrustis did not encompass the deaneries of St Remacle, Hanret, or Chimay.

== Religion ==
Viradecthis (also attested under the Celtic form Virodactis) was the protector-goddess of the Condrusi. Assimilated with the Roman deity of childbirth Lucina, she was honoured c. 200–250 AD at a sanctuary located in Strée (Modave, Condroz), and by a Condrusian soldier serving in the Roman army at Hadrian's Wall. Tungrian sailors celebrated her cult in Fectio (c. 150–250 AD), and other inscriptions were found further east in the Rhineland (Mogontiacum, Kälbertshausen, Trebur).

Several inscriptions were dedicated to the Matris Cantrusteihiae, which seems to mean "mother goddess of the Condrusi (or Condroz)".

== History ==
=== Caesar ===
Most of what we know about the Condrusi comes from Julius Caesar's record of his battles in the area, in Gallic Wars.

In chapter 2.4 of Caesar's commentaries the Condrusi are specifically listed among the Germani cisrhenani, along with the Eburones, the Caeroesi, and the Paemani. At that time, in 57 BC, they were joining an alliance of Belgic tribes against Caesar. The alliance met with defeat against the Romans at the Battle of the Sabis, but some, including many of the Germani, most notably the Eburones, renewed fighting in 54 BC. Caesar stated that these Germani cisrhenani had crossed the Rhine long ago to take control of the fertile land on the other side. They mixed with the local Belgae, and Caesar noted that neighbouring Belgae claimed to be partly of Germanic descent also.

The Germani cisrhenani, who included the Condrusi, kept a distinct identity, and a reputation for military strength, because they were the only Gauls who successfully resisted the Cimbri and Teutones during their migrations in the second century BC.

In chapter 4.6 Caesar reports that the Condrusi were under the protection of the Treveri along with the Eburones. How this circumstance came about is not known, but their territories were thereby not invaded by the Usipetes and Tencteri who had lost their own lands to Suebi and then crossed the Rhine into the lands of the Menapii.

In chapter 6.32 the Condrusi are again mentioned as Germani "on this side of the Rhine" (citra Rhenum), this time along with the Segni (or Segui), as a German tribe claiming not to be involved in the rebellion. Both tribes were reported to live between the Eburones and the Treviri.

=== Roman Empire ===
After their defeat or capitulation, the Germani cisrhenani became part of the civitas Tungrorum in Roman province of Gallia Belgica. But this civitas was eventually split out to become part of Germania Inferior.

An inscription from Blatobulgium (an outpost fort of Hadrian's Wall in modern Scotland) dated 150–160 AD, along with a Roman military diploma giving Condrusus as the ethnic origin of the soldier, show that Gallo-Roman Condrusians served as auxilia within the Roman armies, and could acquire the citizenship at the end of their service.

=== Middle Ages ===
The name of the pagus Condrustis survived not only into Roman times but into the Carolingian era also, being mentioned as a pagus or gau in the early Middle Ages. In this way, the name, like many medieval territorial names, has managed to survive down to the present day, at least as a geographical term.

The earliest medieval attestation was in 747, in a benefaction made by Carloman, son of Charles Martel, to the Abbey of Stavelot-Malmedy. It was clearly mentioned in the Treaty of Meerssen in 870, where it is called the pagus of Condrust.

== See also ==
- List of Germanic peoples

== Sources ==
- Busse, Peter E. (2006). "Belgae". In Koch, John T. (ed.). Celtic Culture: A Historical Encyclopedia. ABC-CLIO. pp. 195–200. ISBN 978-1-85109-440-0.
- Charlier, Marie-Therese (2013), "Pagus Condrustis : le Condroz à l'époque romaine", Meuse et Ardenne, 45: 94
- Dietz, Karlheinz (2006). "Condrusi". Brill's New Pauly.
- Falileyev, Alexander (2010). Dictionary of Continental Celtic Place-names: A Celtic Companion to the Barrington Atlas of the Greek and Roman World. CMCS. ISBN 978-0955718236.
- Neumann, Günter; Stolte, Bernardus Hendrikus (1984), "Condrusi", Reallexikon der Germanischen Altertumskunde (RGA), vol. 5 (2 ed.), Berlin/New York: Walter de Gruyter, pp. 78–80, ISBN 3-11-009635-8
- Neumann, Günter (1999), "Germani cisrhenani — die Aussage der Namen", in Beck, H.; Geuenich, D.; Steuer, H. (eds.), Germanenprobleme in heutiger Sicht, Walter de Gruyter, ISBN 978-3110164381
- Nonn, Ulrich (1983). Pagus und Comitatus in Niederlothringen (in German). L. Röhrscheid. ISBN 978-3-7928-0457-5.
- Roland, Charles Gustave (1920), "Les pagi de Lomme et de Condroz et leurs subdivisions" (PDF), Annales de la Société archéologique de Namur, 34: 1–126
- von Petrikovits, Harald (1999), "Germani Cisrhenani", in Beck, H.; Geuenich, D.; Steuer, H. (eds.), Germanenprobleme in heutiger Sicht, Walter de Gruyter, ISBN 978-3110164381
- Wightman, Edith M. (1985). Gallia Belgica. University of California Press. ISBN 978-0-520-05297-0.
