= Vihansa =

Germanic goddess

Vihansa is the name of a Germanic goddess written on a bronze tablet found in Sint-Huibrechts-Hern, near Tongeren in modern Belgium.

== Name ==
There is general agreement among scholars that the theonym is Germanic; it probably belongs to the Tungrian dialect or language. Vihansa may be a Latinized form of the compound *wiha-ansu-, meaning 'holy deity', or *wīgą-ansu-, meaning 'battle deity'. Marie-Thérèse Raepsaet-Charlier supposes she must have been a warrior deity due to the martial offering mentioned in the inscription.

== Dedication ==
The inscription was engraved by Q. Catius Libo Nepos, centurion with Legio III Cyrenaica, who dedicated his shield and spear to the goddess Vihansa, probably after returning to his homeland from a military service:

Vihansae / Q(uintus) Catius Libo Nepos / centurio leg(ionis) III / Cyrenaicae scu/tum et lanceam d(onum) d(edit)

— Corpus Inscriptionum Latinarum CIL XIII, 3592.
