= Sicambri =

Roman-era Germanic people

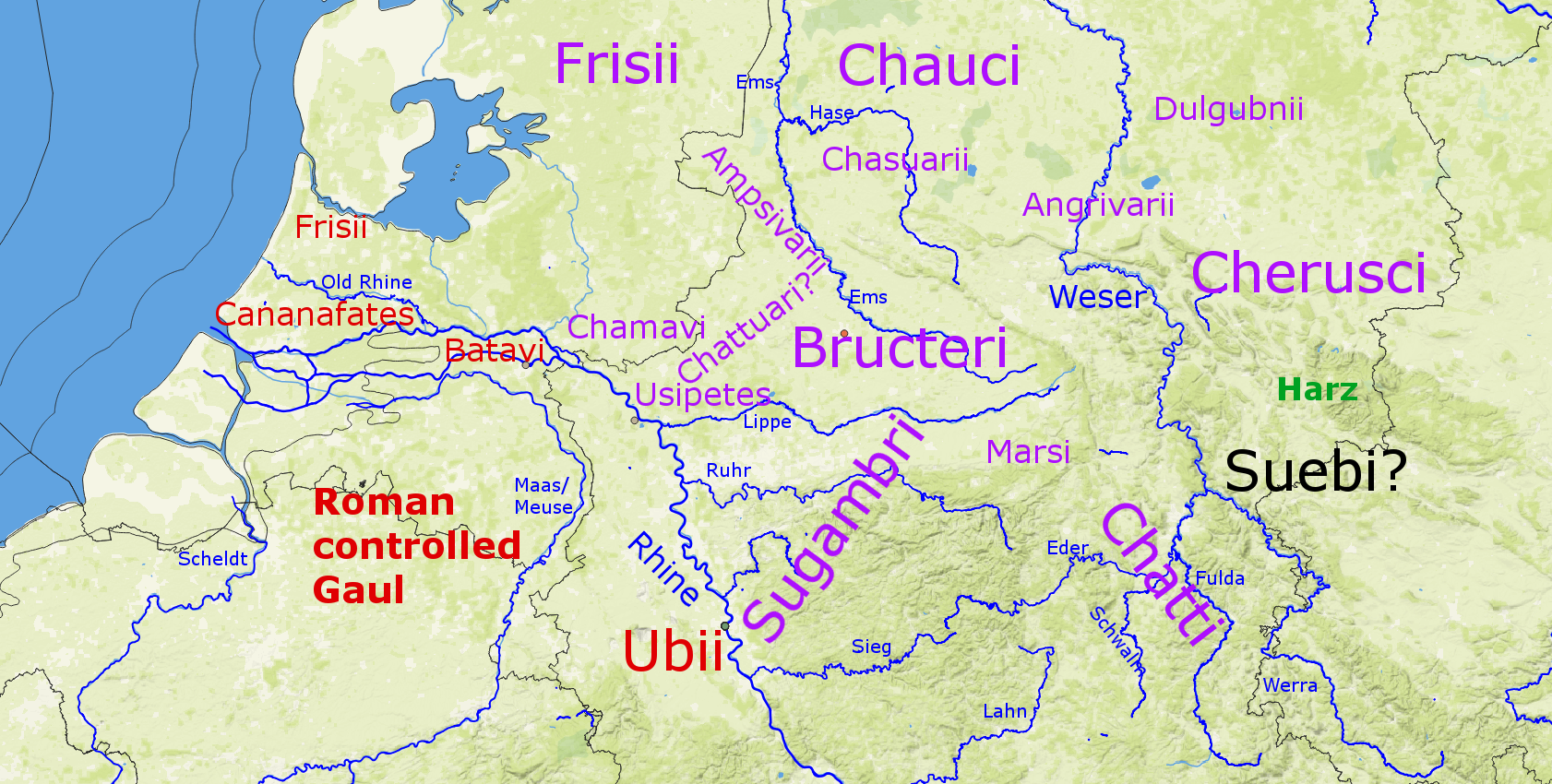
The approximate locations of the Sicambri and Bructeri in about 10 BC

The Sicambri or Sugambri were a Germanic people who lived in the area between the Rhine, Lippe, and Wupper rivers, in what is now Germany, near the border with the Netherlands. They were first reported by Julius Caesar, who encountered them in 55 BC. They became a significant opponent of Roman imperial power in the Rhine region. After a major defeat by the Romans in 8 BC many of the Sicambri were moved into Roman territory.

Caesar categorized them as a Germanic people (Germani), although he did not necessarily define ethnicity in terms of language. Whether or not the Sicambri spoke a Germanic or Celtic language, or something else, is not certain. They lived in a contact zone where these two language families came into contact and were both influential.

By the 3rd century, the region in which they and their neighbours had lived had become part of the territory of the Franks, which was a new name that possibly represented a new alliance of older tribes, possibly including the Sicambri. However, many Sicambri had been moved into the Roman empire by this time.

== Name and language ==
The specific way the name is spelled can differ considerably across sources. The Dictionary of Greek and Roman Geography gives four variant spellings under the entry Sicambri: Sycambri, Sygambri, Sugambri, and Sucambri. The earliest source, Caesar's Commentarii de Bello Gallico, calls them Sugambri but in later sources they are more commonly called Sicambri.

A Germanic etymology has been proposed for the name of the Sicambri or Sugambri. The first element su- is proposed to be a little-known Germanic version of Indo-European root meaning "good", which is better attested in Celtic languages. The second part of the name is associated with the little-known Gambrivii, who are mentioned twice by Roman sources, and sometimes associated with the Sicambri by modern scholars, because of the similar names.

The material culture of the early Sicambri was a variant of the La Tène culture, which is associated with Celtic languages. Like the Cimbri, and like their neighbours across the Rhine, the Eburones, many names of Sicambrian leaders end in typical Celtic suffixes like -rix (Baetorix, Deudorix, etc.). If the Sicambri were not Celtic speakers themselves, this could also indicate intense contacts with Celtic peoples across the Rhine in Gaul.

== History ==
=== Gallic Wars of Caesar ===
The first mention of the Sicambri is in the fourth book of Caesar's Commentarii de Bello Gallico, corresponding to year 55 BC. Under the name Sugambri he described them living on the eastern bank of the Rhine, north of the Ubii, stretching to a point near the Rhine delta begins, where he said there were settlements of Menapii. Modern researchers locate their main centers of settlement between the rivers Sieg and Lippe with a concentration between the rivers Rhine, Lippe, and Wupper.

The tribe had an ancillary role in the Gallic Wars. Two other transrhenic tribes, the Tencteri and Usipetes, crossed into the Eburones' territory on the western side of the Rhine, where large numbers were slaughtered by Caesar. Their cavalry escaped across the Rhine and received refuge with the Sicambri, who refused Caesar's demand that the refugees be handed over. As a show of Roman strength, Caesar built a pile bridge across the Rhine and advanced into Sicambri territory. The Sicambri did not wait for his arrival, but on the advice of their wards, withdrew into forests and uninhabited areas where Caesar was unable to follow them. However, their villages, farms, and grain fields were systematically destroyed. Caesar withdrew after 18 days across the Rhine and destroyed the bridge on his return.

In 53 BC, after Caesar defeated the Eburones, but failed to capture their leader Ambiorix, he reported that he invited neighbouring peoples to destroy the remainder. Some 2,000 Sicambrian horsemen responded to Caesar's call and, crossing the Rhine in boats, advanced into the Eburones' territory. After gathering cattle, they were encouraged by captive Eburones to attack the Roman garrison at Aduatuca, where the Romans had stored a large amount of plunder. In his report Caesar emphasized that the landscape was difficult for the Romans, but "neither morass nor forest obstructs these men, born amid war and depredations". The Romans at Aduatuca were busy foraging, and thus caught off-guard by the attack, and repelled it only with substantial difficulty and losses. The Sicambri were able to retire back across the Rhine with their plunder, and without any reprisal.

=== Germanic wars of Augustus ===
Under the ensuing hegemony of the Romans in this region, the Rhine became a frontier, and the successors of Caesar helped fortify and reinforce their allies the Ubii, to the south of the Sicambri near modern Cologne. A faction of Chatti were also able to settle in Roman-controlled Batavia, in the Rhine delta just east of the Sugambri, becoming the Batavians. The Sicambri were thus enclosed within a pincer movement by Rome's frontier policy.

In 16 BC, during the reign of Augustus (r. 27 BC – AD 14), the Sicambrian leader Melo, brother of Baetorix, organised a raid including Tencteri and Usipetes, which defeated a Roman army under the command of Marcus Lollius. The Sugambri had damaged the prestige of the emperor, and they were quickly willing to negotiate agreements to prevent Roman reprisals. It nevertheless sparked a reaction from the Roman Empire and helped start the series of Germanic Wars. Among actions undertaken at this time the Romans established a fort at present day Xanten.

From 12 BC–8 BC, the Roman empire put pressure upon the Sicambri and other opponents in this region in multiple campaigns, facing the Sicambri core lands. In 12 BC the Sicambri made attacks across the Rhine. Nero Claudius Drusus (Drusus the Elder) launched an attack from Batavia, moving first through the lands of the Usipetes, and then devastated the Sicambrian country. In 11 BC he then devastated the Usipetes' country, and built a bridge over the Lippe in order to once again enter the Sicambrian lands. There he faced little resistance because they were in a conflict with their neighbours the Chatti. He was able to cross this country and reach the Cherusci frontier near the Weser. Drusus faced stiff resistance upon his return, but he defeated the Sicambri and it was probably at this time that the Romans built their fort at Oberaden, well east of the Rhine in Sicambrian territory. These descriptions show that the tribe was living to the south of the river Lippe, with the Usipetes now settled to their northwest.

In 9 BC the Sicambri battled Drusus as part of a major alliance with the Cherusci and Suevi and lost. In 8–7 BC, after this defeat and the death of Drusus, the future emperor Tiberius forced the Sicambri, or a part of them, to move to the western, Roman-controlled, side of the Rhine. Modern historians speculate that they possibly merged into Romanized population immediately facing their old lands, who were known from about this time as the Cugerni. The more detailed description of this period by Cassius Dio however describes the results of the victories of Tiberius somewhat differently:

Accordingly all the barbarians except the Sugambri, through fear of them, made overtures of peace; but they gained nothing either at this time, — for Augustus refused to conclude a truce with them without the Sugambri, — or, indeed, later. To be sure, the Sugambri also sent envoys, 3 but so far were they from accomplishing anything that all of these envoys, who were both many and distinguished, perished into the bargain. For Augustus arrested them and placed them in various cities; and they, being greatly distressed at this, took their own lives. The Sugambri were thereupon quiet for a time, but later they amply requited the Romans for their calamity.

It appears that Tiberius used a diplomatic approach whereby the Sicambrian nobles were isolated as the Germanic region became more peace-seeking. More cooperative Germanic leaders took the upper hand. They accepted a Roman demand to move about 40,000 individuals people to the Xanten area west of the Rhine and elites were settled under the watchful eye of the Roman military.

In 9 AD, Deudorix, son of Baetorix, joined the Germanic rebellion of Arminius, of the Cherusci, which annihilated the 3 Roman legions of Publius Quinctilius Varus. After the defeat of this alliance, Deudorix was among the captives paraded in Rome during the triumph of Germanicus.

Strabo, writing around 20 AD, described the position of Sicambri using similar words to Caesar, and possibly based upon them. He placed them next to the Menapii, "who dwell on both sides of the river Rhine near its mouth, in marshes and low thorny woods. It is opposite to these Menapii that the Sicambri are situated". Strabo describes them as Germanic, and notes that beyond them are the Suevi and other peoples. Elsewhere however, Strabo mentions that the Rhine valley Germans have mainly been displaced: "there are but few remaining, and some portion of them are Sicambri". He apparently understood their position on the Rhine to literally be on the coast. With the German wars still on-going, he describes them as being one of the most well-known Germanic tribes in his time.

In contrast to those Sicambri who were moved west of the Rhine, the main part of the Sicambri "migrated deep into the country anticipating the Romans" according to Strabo. It has been suggested that the Marsi were a part of the Sicambri who managed to stay east of the Rhine after most had been moved from the area to join the Eburones and other cisrhenic Germans. By the time of Rome's conflict with the British Silures, Tacitus reports that the Sicambri could be mentioned as an historical example of a tribe who "had been formerly destroyed or transplanted into Gaul".

Claudius Ptolemy, in the second century AD, still located the Sicambri, together with the Bructeri Minores, at the most northern part of the Rhine and south of the Frisii who inhabit the coast north of the river. However it is likely that this part of his geography was based upon earlier Roman authors.

== Legacy ==
Although the Sicambri ceased to exist as an independent political entity in 8 BC, their legacy was preserved through the traditional names of three Roman auxiliary cohorts, and a Roman literary tradition which portrayed them as archetypical warlike savages, with a resistance to higher culture.

In 26 AD, some Sicambrian auxiliaries allied to Rome were involved in crushing an uprising of Thracian tribesmen. All inscriptions found mentioning the Sicambri are from the period 76-157 AD, with the exception of one uncertain example from Mauretania in North Africa, which is dated to 255 AD. After this the only clear surviving records of the Sicambri are as a literary trope. There are around 20 inscriptions mentioning the cohortes Sugambrorum found mainly in the north of the Balkans, where they apparently helped defend the Lower Danube frontier regions in present-day Romania, Bulgaria, and North Macedonia. Others are found in Turkey, and the city of Rome itself.

As a literary stereotype the Sicambri were used by some of the best-known poets of the Augustan era, setting an example for later literature. For example, in the later part of the first century AD, Martial, in his Liber De Spectaculis, a series of epigrams written to celebrate the games in the Colosseum under Titus or Domitian, noted the attendance of numerous peoples, including the Sicambri: "With locks twisted into a knot, are come the Sicambrians..." Another poet who used this trope was Horace, in his Odes.

Centuries later, authors of Late Antiquity used the Sicambri name as a literate alias for the Franks which was a new name that covered the various tribes of the same region where the Sicambri had lived. This was part of a bigger tendency in literature. For example, the Goths, who similarly appeared in the third century, were routinely called Getae or Scythians. Authors who referred to the Franks as Sicambri included Claudian in a panegyric of about 400 AD, Sidonius Apollinaris, Venantius Fortunatus, , the Life of King Sigismund, and the Life of King Dagobert.

This literary tradition had an influence lasting into the early Middle Ages. In the 6th century, Gregory of Tours reports that when Clovis I was baptised by Saint Remigius in 496 this bishop called Clovis a Sigamber, while referring to past barbarity: "Bow your gentle neck, Sigamber; adore what you have burned, burn what you have adored." (Mitis depone colla, Sigamber; adora quod incendisti, incende quod adorasti.)

Some scholars such as Wallace-Hadrill have proposed that this special prominence of the Sicambri among the likely ancestors of the Merovingians must indicate that the Merovingian dynasty believed itself to be specifically descended from them.

== Sicambri in the Frankish origins myth ==
A tradition which Gregory of Tours reports to have been widely believed, was that the Franks, like the Romans, descended from the ancient Trojans. In some versions of this myth the name of the Sicambri seems to have had a role. According to this myth, after the fall of Troy, the ancestors of the Franks moved first to the Danube, in Roman Pannonia, and from there to the Rhine valley. Later mediaeval authors writing in the seventh and eighth centuries reported more elaborate and fanciful versions of this Pannonia myth, and one version mentions a Frankish city in Pannonia called Sicambria.

The Liber Historiae Francorum, written in 727 AD, asserts that after Troy's fall, two leaders called Priam and Antenor lead some 12,000 men to the river Tanais (now called the Don, in Russia) and from there they settled in Pannonia, which the author wrongly understood to adjoin the Sea of Azov. In Pannonia they constructed a city called Sicambria. A Roman emperor called Valentinian, offering remission of taxes, incited the Franks to fight the Alans in the Maeotic Swamps on the Sea of Azov. But after the tax remission elapsed the Franks killed Valentinian's tax collectors, leading to a battle in which king Priam died. The Franks then left Pannonia behind for the Rhine valley. (The Chronicle of Fredegar, in contrast, asserts that these Trojan Franks founded a city on the Rhine named after their ancestral city of "Troy". This apparently refers to Xanten, the fort built to confront the Sicambri, and known in Latin as Colonia Ulpia Traiana, after the emperor Trajan.)

These legends are rejected by modern scholars since there is no evidence that the Franks originated anywhere other than the Rhine valley. Scholars have nevertheless made various speculations about the original sources of the myth, which may have included misunderstandings of real events. For example, Ian Wood has suggested that the claim of Trojan ancestry, and thus kinship with the Romans, may have been encouraged by Roman diplomacy, because a similar story seems to have developed for the Burgundians in this period.

== See also ==
- List of Germanic peoples
- Cimmerians

== Bibliography ==
=== Modern sources ===
- Buchberger, Erica (2016). "Romans, barbarians, and Franks in the writings of Venantius Fortunatus". Early Medieval Europe. 24 (3): 293–307. doi:10.1111/emed.12153. ISSN 0963-9462.
- Creer, Tyler (2019). "Ethnography in Caesar's Gallic War and its implications for composition". Classical Quarterly. 69 (1): 246–263. doi:10.1017/S0009838819000405. ISSN 0009-8388.
- Derks, Tom (2009). "Ethnic identity in the Roman frontier. The epigraphy of Batavi and other Lower Rhine tribes". In Derks, Ton; Roymans, Nico (eds.). Ethnic Constructs in Antiquity: The Role of Power and Tradition. Amsterdam University Press. ISBN 978-90-8964-078-9.
- Goffart, Walter (1981). "Rome, Constantinople, and the Barbarians". American Historical Review. 86 (2): 275–306. doi:10.2307/1857439. ISSN 0002-8762. JSTOR 1857439.
- Heinrichs, Johannes (2005). "Sugambrer". In Beck, Heinrich; Geuenich, Dieter; Steuer, Heiko (eds.). Reallexikon der germanischen Altertumskunde (in German). Vol. 30 (2 ed.). De Gruyter. doi:10.1515/9783110906226. ISBN 978-3-11-018385-6.
- Krüger, Bruno (1983). Krüger, Bruno (ed.). Die Germanen: Geschichte und Kultur der germanischen Stämme in Mitteleuropa (in German). Vol. 4, 1. Berlin: Akademie-Verlag. doi:10.1515/9783112617809. ISBN 978-3-11-261780-9.
- Lanting, J. N.; van der Plicht, J (Dec 15, 2010). "De ¹⁴C Chronologie van de Nederlandse Pre- en Protohistorie VI". Palaeohistoria. 51/52. Barkhuis. ISBN 9789077922736.
- Neumann, Günter (1998). "Gambrivii, Namenkundliches". In Beck, Heinrich; Steuer, Heiko; Dieter, Timpe (eds.). Reallexikon der Germanischen Altertumskunde (in German). Vol. 10 (2nd ed.). De Gruyter. ISBN 978-3-11-015102-2.
- Schönfeld, Moritz (1931). "Sugambri". Realencyclopädie der classischen Altertumswissenschaft (in German). Vol. IV A, 1. Stuttgart: Butcher. cols. 659–61.
- Murray, Alexander Callander (1999), From Roman to Merovingian Gaul: A Reader, Readings in Medieval Civilizations and Cultures, University of Toronto Press, ISBN 9781442689732
- Sitzmann, Alexander; Grünzweig, Friedrich E; Nedoma, Robert; Reichert, Hermann (2008). Die altgermanischen Ethnonyme: ein Handbuch zu ihrer Etymologie. Philologica Germanica (in German). Wien: Fassbaender. ISBN 978-3-902575-07-4.
- Anderson, Thomas (1995), "Roman military colonies in Gaul, Salian Ethnogenesis and the forgotten meaning of Pactus Legis Salicae 59.5.", Early Medieval Europe, 4: 129–144, doi:10.1111/j.1468-0254.1995.tb00064.x
- Van Loon, Jozef (2016). "Lanaken en de vroegste geschiedenis van Franken en Merovingen". Verslagen & Mededelingen (in Dutch). 126 (1–2). ISSN 2033-6446.
- Wolters, Reinhard (2008). Die Schlacht im Teutoburger Wald: Arminius, Varus und das römische Germanien (in German). München: C H Beck. ISBN 978-3-406-57674-4.
- Wood, Ian (1993). The Merovingian Kingdoms. Routledge. ISBN 978-0-582-49372-8.

=== Ancient sources ===
- Caesar. Bellum Gallicum. On Perseus project: .
- Dio. Roman History.
- Fredegar (1960). The fourth book of the Chronicle of Fredegar; with its continuations. Translated by Wallace-Hadrill, J M. OCLC 401901.
- Martial. Liber de Spectaculis. Chapter 3.
- Ptolemy. Geography.
- Strabo. Geography.
- Suetonius. Augustus. Lives of the Caesars.
- Tacitus. Annales . Translated by Church, Alfred John; Brodribb, William Jackson – via Wikisource. (Translated 1876.)
