= Caerosi =

Belgic-Germanic tribe

The Caerosi (or Caeroesi) were a small Belgic-Germanic tribe that lived in Gallia Belgica during the Iron Age and the Roman period. Their ethnic identity remains uncertain. Caesar described them as part of the Germani Cisrhenani, but their tribal name is probably of Celtic origin. Like other Germani Cisrhenani tribes, it is possible that their old Germanic endonym came to be abandoned after a tribal reorganization, that they received their names from their Celtic neighbours, or else that they were fully or partially assimilated into Celtic culture at the time of the Roman invasion of the region in 57 BC.

== Name ==
They are mentioned as Caerosos (var. ceroesos, caeroesos, cerosos) by Caesar (mid-1st c. BC), and as Caerosi by Orosius (early 5th c. AD).

The ethnonym Caerosi probably derives from a Proto-Celtic stem reconstructed as *caer- ('sheep'; cf. Old Irish caera), itself from an earlier *caper- (cf. Latin caper, Old Norse hafr, 'billy goat', Greek kápros 'boar'). The variant Caeroesi has an unexplained suffix (-oeso-), which is not found in either Celtic or Germanic languages, although -oso- is a known suffix in Gaulish (e.g. Laudosa, Iboso). It may be translated as 'the sheep', 'the rams', or else 'rich in sheep', although its exact meaning remains unclear. It is linguistically related to other Celtic ethnonyms such as Caeracates, Caereni, and Kairènoi (Καιρηνοί).

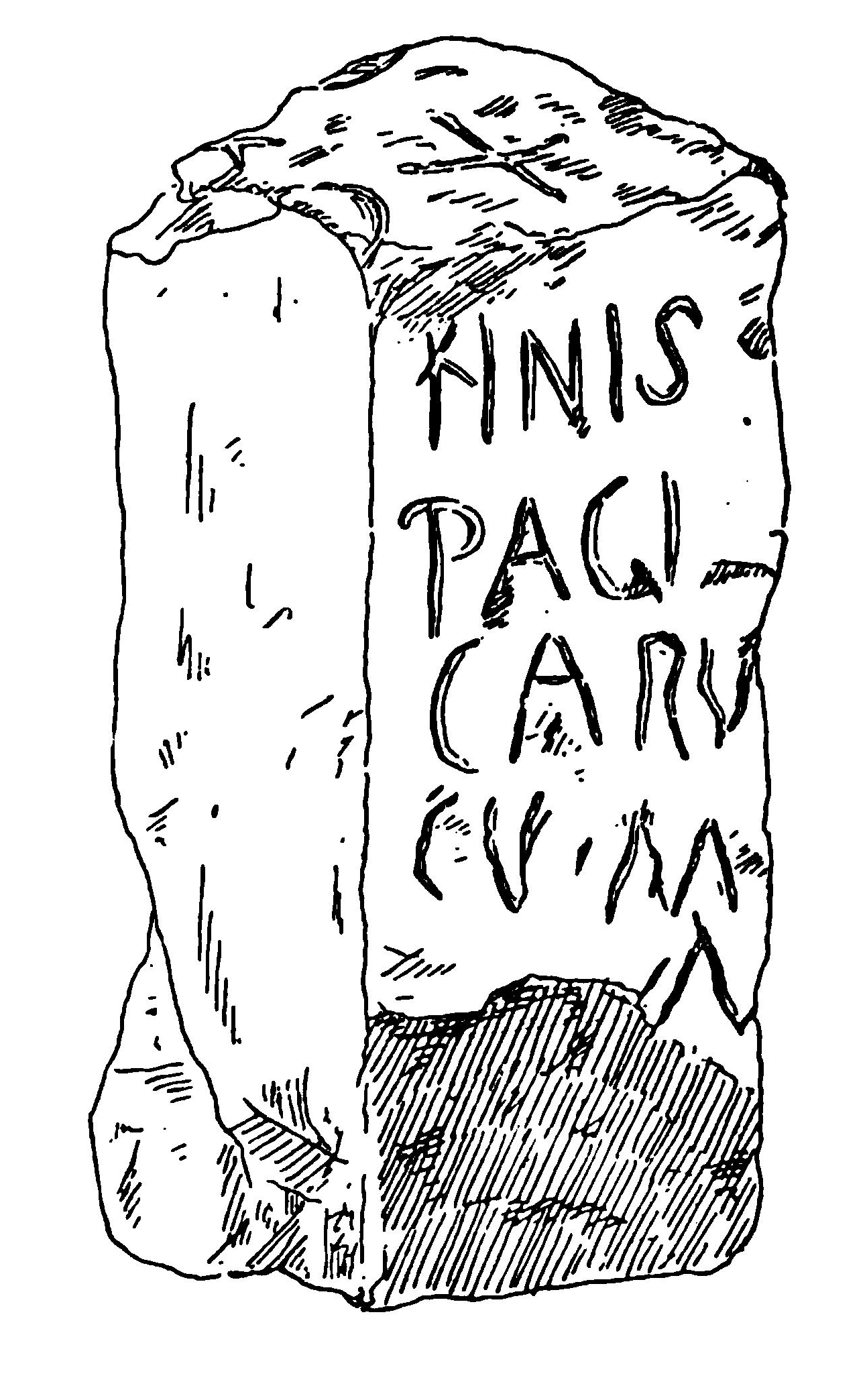
Boundary marker of the Pagus Carucum.

Alternative comparisons with the Old Irish cáera ('berry'), the Middle Irish céar ('dark brown'), or the Proto-Germanic *haira- ('worthy, exalted, *grey-haired'; cf. Mod. High German hehr 'noble') have also been proposed by some scholars.

The region of pagus Carucum, a Roman-era subdivision of the Treveri later known under the Franks as Pagus Coroascus, may be named after the tribe, although the linguistic connection remains uncertain. The name has been discovered on a Roman era boundary marker carved with the inscription 'FINIS PAGI CARV CVM' ('boundary or end of the pagus Carucum'), located in a wooded area near Neidenbach and Kyllburg.

== Geography ==
The Caerosi lived in the Ardennes and Eifel region, between the Rhine and Meuse rivers, near the Treverii in the south, the Condrusi in the west, the Paemani and Eburones in the north, and the Ubii on the opposite bank of the Rhine in the east.

To the east of Neidenbach, the Vinxtbach, a small river flowing eastwards to the Rhine, marked the boundary between the Roman provinces of Germania Superior and Germania Inferior. The name Vinxtbach is in fact thought to derive from the Latin word finis, meaning an end or boundary. Today, the place is still a boundary between modern German dialects, with Ripuarian to the north, and Moselle Frankish to the south. Also located nearby is the modern boundary of the modern German Länder of Rheinland-Pfalz and Nordrhein-Westfalen.

== See also ==
- Sherman-roots.com
- Sherman Project DNA
