= Menapii =

Belgic tribe

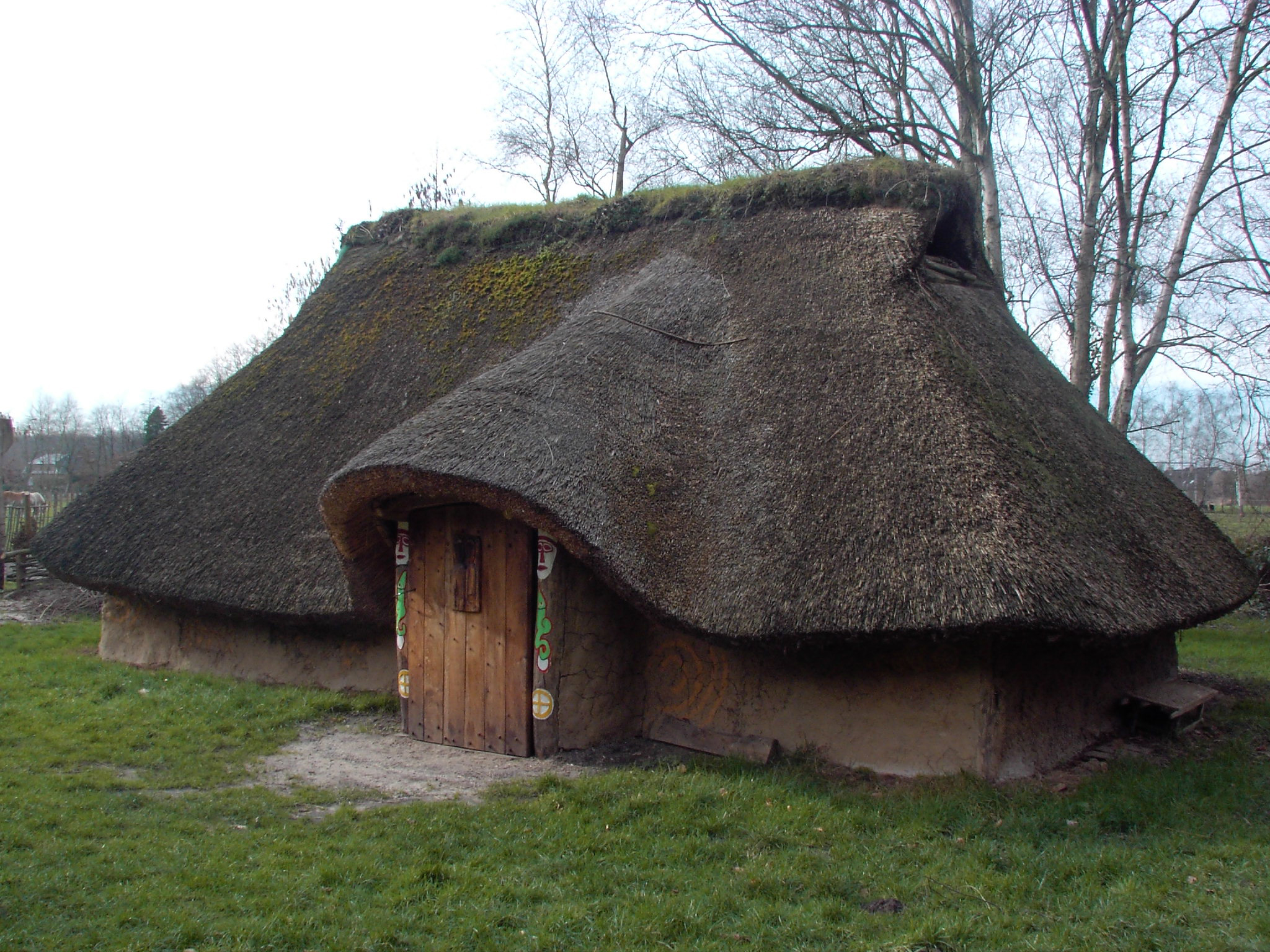
Reconstruction of a Menapian dwelling at Destelbergen.

The Menapii were a Belgic tribe dwelling near the North Sea, around present-day Cassel, during the Iron Age and the Roman period.

== Name ==
=== Attestations ===
They are mentioned as Menapii by Caesar (mid-1st c. BC) and Orosius (early 5th c. AD), Menápioi (Μενάπιοι; var. Μονάπιοι, Μενάσπιοι) by Strabo (early 1st c. AD) and Ptolemy (2nd c. AD), as Menapi by Pliny (1st c. AD) and the Notitia Dignitatum (5th c. AD), and under the accusative forms Menapios by Tacitus (early 2nd c. AD) and Menapíous (Μεναπίους) by Cassius Dio (3rd c. AD).

=== Etymology ===
The Gaulish ethnonym Menapii has been phonetically compared with Manapii, the name of a tribe from southeastern Ireland mentioned by Ptolemy in the 2nd century AD. These tribal names may ultimately derive from a Proto-Celtic form reconstructed as *Menak^{w}ī or *Manak^{w}ī, whose meaning remains uncertain, perhaps the 'mountain people' or the 'high-living people' (from the root *mon- 'mountain'; cf. MWelsh mynydd, OBret. monid, OCo. menit), or from the root *men- ('think, remember'; cf. OIr. muinithir 'think', Welsh mynnu 'wish').

The city of Cassel, attested on Peutinger's Tabula as Castellum Menapiorum (Cassello in 840–75, Cassel in 1110), is indirectly named after the tribe.

== History ==
The Menapii were persistent opponents of Julius Caesar's conquest of Gaul, resisting until 54 BC. They were part of the Belgic confederacy defeated by Caesar in 57 BC, contributing 9,000 men. The following year they sided with the Veneti against Caesar. Caesar was again victorious, but the Menapii and the Morini refused to make peace and continued to fight against him. They withdrew into the forests and swamps and conducted a hit-and-run campaign. Caesar responded by cutting down the forests, seizing their cattle and burning their settlements, but this was interrupted by heavy rain and the onset of winter, and the Menapii and Morini withdrew further into the forests. In 55 BC the Menapii tried to resist a Germanic incursion across the Rhine, but were defeated. Later that year, while Caesar made his first expedition to Britain, he sent two of his legates and the majority of his army to the territories of the Menapii and Morini to keep them under control. Once again, they retired to the woods, and the Romans burned their crops and settlements. The Menapii joined the revolt led by Ambiorix in 54 BC. Caesar says that they, alone of all the tribes of Gaul, had never sent ambassadors to him to discuss terms of peace, and had ties of hospitality with Ambiorix. For that reason he decided to lead five legions against them. A renewed campaign of devastation finally forced them to submit, and Caesar placed his ally Commius of the Atrebates in control of them.

A cohort of Menapian auxiliaries is attested by inscriptions dating to the 2nd century in Britain. Carausius, the 3rd century commander of the Roman fleet who declared himself emperor of Britain and northern Gaul, was a Menapian, born in Batavia. A legion called the Menapii Seniores is mentioned in the Notitia Dignitatum, a 5th-century register of Roman government positions and military commands.

== Geography ==
=== Territory ===
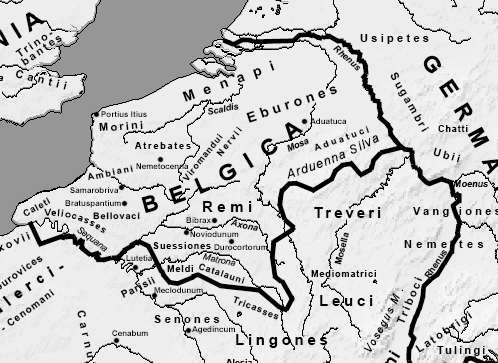
Territories of the Belgae

According to descriptions in such authors as Strabo, Caesar, Pliny the Elder and Ptolemy their territory had stretched northwards to the mouth of the Rhine in the north, but more lastingly it stretched along the west of the Scheldt river. In later geographical terms this territory corresponds roughly to the modern Belgian coast, the Belgian provinces of East and West Flanders. It also extended into neighbouring France and the river deltas of the Southern Netherlands.

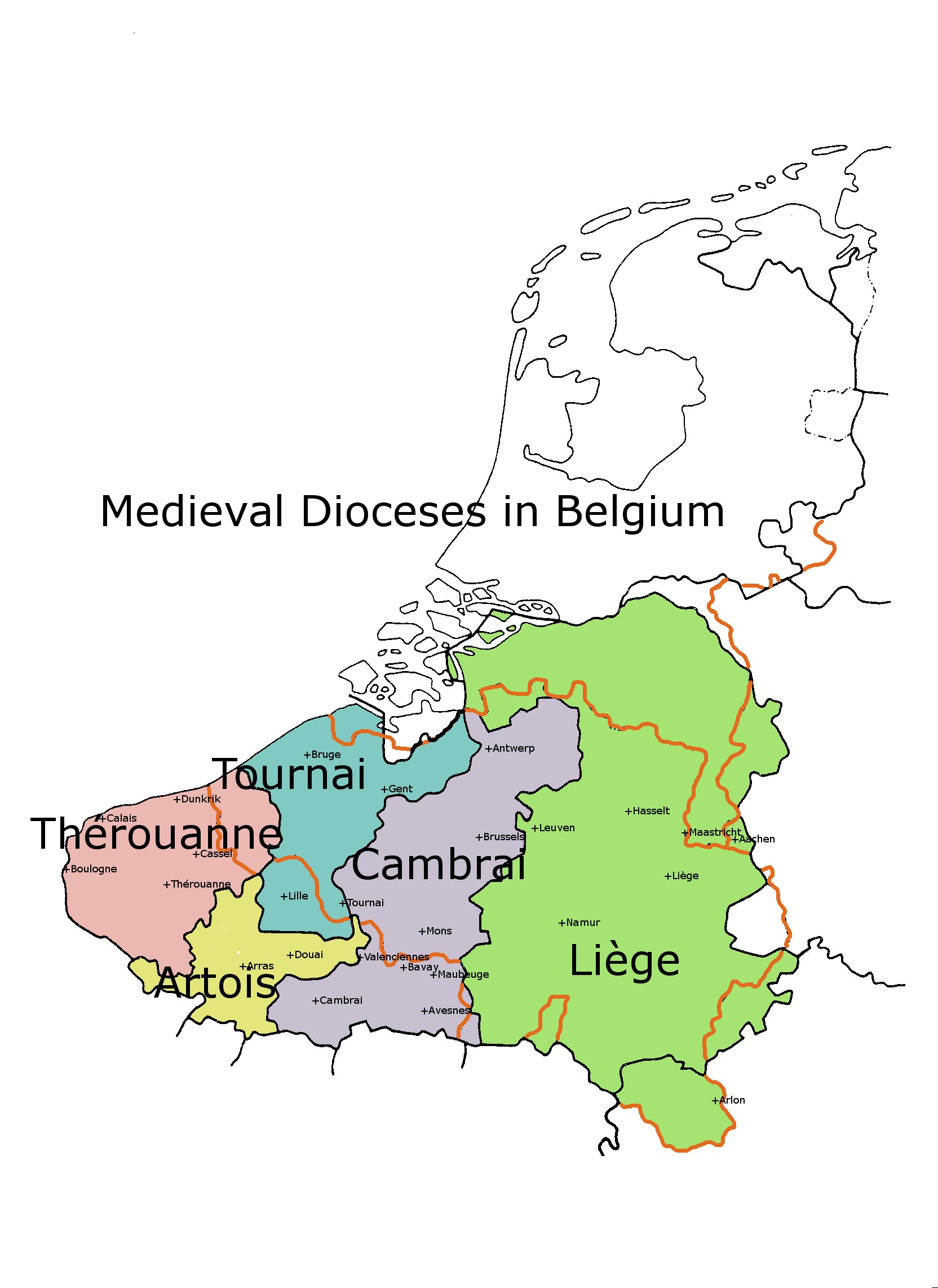
The diocese of Tournai may be based on the territory of the Menapii, although it must have stretched further, including Cassel during Roman times, and even stretching to the Waal river in the time of Caesar.

To the north and east of the Menapii lay the Rhine–Meuse–Scheldt delta. In the time of Caesar, the Menapii had settlements throughout this region and as far as the Rhine in present-day Germany, or at least its branch, the Waal. During Roman times these islands were under the frontier province of Germania Inferior, and inhabited partly by various groups of people who had moved there under Roman rule. Pliny the elder lists the people in these "Gallic Islands" as Batavi and Canninefates on the largest island, Frisii and the Chauci whose main lands were to the north of the deltas, and the Frisiavones, Sturii, and Marsacii. Of these last three, the Marsaci appear to be mentioned in another place by Pliny as having a presence on the coast south of the delta, neighbouring the Menapii, within Gaul itself. The Frisiavones are also mentioned within the listing for Belgian Gaul, but probably therefore lived in the part of the delta south of the Batavi, northeast of the Menapii. In one inscription, from Bulla Regia, the Tungri, Batavians and Frisiavones are grouped together, apparently confirming that the Frisiavones lived inland. It is suggested that the Marsaci and the Sturii could be "pagi" belonging to the civitas of either the Frisiavones or the Menapii. South of the delta, east of the river Scheldt from the Menapii, and therefore apparently south of the Frisiavones, Pliny mentions the Toxandri, in a position apparently on the northern edge of Gaul. It is known that the Toxandri were associated with the civitates of both the Nervii and the Tungri, so they presumably had a presence in both.

While in Pliny the Menapii do not stretch beyond the Scheldt, in Strabo's 1st-century Geographica, they are situated further away than the Nervii and on both sides of the Rhine near its outlets to the sea, apparently not far from the Germanic Sigambri. Apparently following Caesar he said that they "dwell amongst marshes and forests, not lofty, but consisting of dense and thorny wood". They are also referred to in Ptolemy's 2nd century Geographia, situated "above" the Nervii, and near the Meuse river.

While these authors make it clear that the Menapii still lay north of the Nervii in Roman times, it is not clear if they still bordered directly upon the former territory of the Eburones, as they had been in Caesar's time, and which in imperial times was within the Civitas Tungrorum, or civitas of the Tungri. In any case as mentioned above they bordered in Roman times upon the Toxandrians, who apparently lived in the north of the lands of the Nervii and Tungri.

South of the Menapii were the Atrebates in Artois, and south-west along the coast were the Morini. The boundary with the Morini in classical times appears to have been the river Aa.

In the later Roman Empire, The Princeton Encyclopedia of Classical Sites reports that "Cassel was superseded as capital of the Menapii by Tournai after Gaul was reorganized under Diocletian and Constantine the Great. The civitas Menapiorum became the civitas Turnencensium." By medieval times, when these Roman districts evolved into medieval Roman Catholic dioceses, Cassel had in fact become part of the diocese of Thérouanne, which had been the civitas of the Morini.

=== Settlements ===
Their civitas, or administrative capital, under the Roman Empire was Cassel in northern France, and later this was moved nearer to a river in Tournai, in present-day Belgium, on the Scheldt. Both of these are near Thérouanne, which was the civitas of the neighbouring Morini tribe, and indeed in the Middle Ages Cassel became part of the Catholic Diocese of Thérouanne. Cassel was therefore in the southern extreme of the Menapii lands. A pattern of placing Roman tribal capitals in the south is also found in the neighbouring Belgian tribal states, of the Nervii and Tungri. The positions of such Roman tribal capitals frequently didn't correspond to the centre of a tribe's territory in pre-Roman political geography. Similarly, in those neighbouring regions, the centre of Roman civilization was typically moved further south, and on to a major river, in late Roman times, after the area was threatened by Frankish tribes from outside the empire.

== Economy ==
The economic activity of the Menapii was primarily from sheep's wool and the fabrication of primitive cloths, activities perfected during the Roman control of the region. These cloths were one of the most rare things in terms of goods, because of the geographical location where they were made. Besides, these cloths were exported to Italy and other regions through the Rhine.
