= Boduognatus =

Chieftain of the Nervii

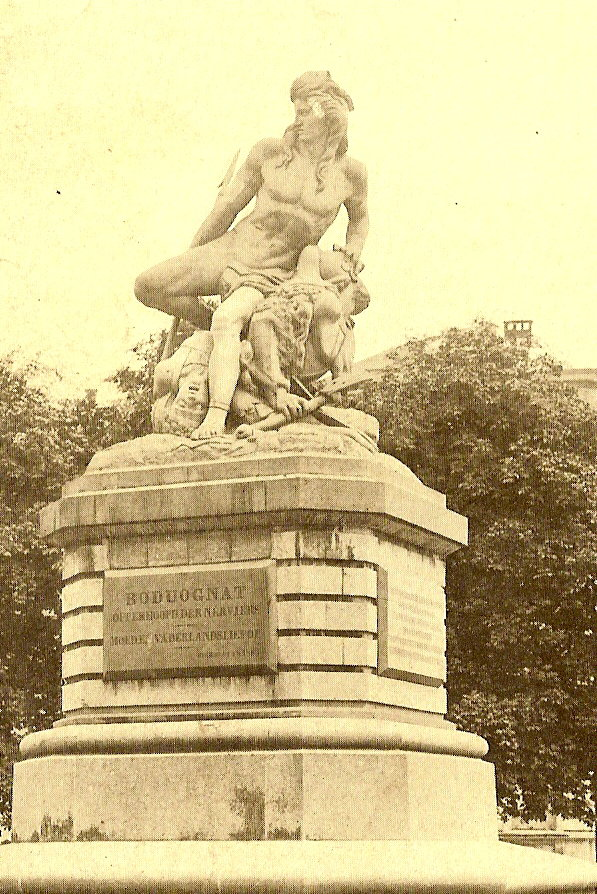
- Boduognat by Joseph Ducaju (1865)
- Born: c. 1st century BC; Belgic confederation
- Died: 57 BC (presumed); Saulzoir, France
- Occupations: Aristocrat; Military leader
- Known for: Resisting the Roman conquest of Gaul
- Military career
- Allegiance: Nervii
- Conflicts: Gallic Wars: Battle of the Sabis †

Boduognatus or Boduognat (likely died 57 BC) was a Belgic aristocrat and military leader who belonged to the Nervii, a Gallo-Germanic tribe that resided in what is now Belgium during the first century BC. The little that we know of Boduognatus is found in Book II of Caesar's Commentarii de Bello Gallico.

During the Gallic Wars (58–50 BC), Boduognatus served as commander of an alliance of Belgic tribes who resisted the Roman invaders during Julius Caesar's Belgic campaign in 57 BC. Near the modern town of Saulzoir, France, his forces ambushed the Roman legions at the Battle of the Sabis, in which he almost overwhelmed Caesar and his men. After the Romans recovered, however, the Belgic force was gradually worn down and the Nervii were massacred. Boduognatus may have been killed during the battle.

== Etymology ==
The name Boduognatos contains two elements: *boduos/boduo ("crow", compare to Irish Badb or the Gaulish deity Cathubodua) and *gnatos ("son, son of").. Boduognatos can therefore be literally translated as "son of the crow" and perhaps figuratively as "son of war" or "warrior".

== Gallic Wars ==
=== Background ===
In the 1st century BC, the area of northern Gaul was inhabited by a large tribal confederation known as the Belgae who resided between the Rhine, the river Seine, and the English Channel. Among the various tribes and peoples who made up the Belgae were the Nervii, who occupied a stretch of land in modern central Belgium, and to which Boduognatus belonged. In 58 BC, Julius Caesar would begin his conquest of Gaul after intervening in the affairs of the Aedui and the Sequani and in 57 BC, he would invade the Belgae, alleging that they were plotting against the Romans.

=== Battle of the Sabis ===
After defeating the Belgae at the Battle of the Axona and securing the surrender of the Suessiones, the Bellovaci, and the Ambiani, Caesar moved to conquer the Nervii who had persuaded the Atrebates, the Viromandui, and the Atuatuci to continue fighting and gathered at the river Sabis (now believed to be the Selle river but thought in the 19th century to be the Sambre.)

After the Romans marched for three days into Nervian territory and began breaking ground to establish a camp overlooking the Sabis, Belgic forces rushed from the trees and from across the river. Engrossed in the construction efforts and not expecting combat, the legionaries were taken by surprise and almost completely overrun. The legions X Equestris and IX Triumphalis succeeded at driving the forces from the Atrebates back across the river while Legio XI and Legio VIII halted the Viromandui but these maneuvers created an opening which allowed Boduognatus to lead a Nervii column into the Roman camp. Exhausted of reserves, Caesar traveled to the first line to boost his men's morale.

After holding out against the Belgic forces for a time, Caesar's force would be relieved when Legio X under Titus Labienus seized the Belgic camp across the river and returned to attack the Nervii from behind. In addition, Legions XIII and XIV, which had been guarding the baggage train, joined the battle and the tide turned in the Romans' favor. The Nervii were pushed closer and closer together and reportedly fought nearly to the last man, standing on the bodies of slain comrades and throwing the Romans' own projectiles back at them until the few remaining broke and fled. Boduognatus is presumed to have been killed although it is never explicitly stated in Caesar's account of the battle.

== Legacy ==
Boduognatus would remain a fairly obscure figure until the 19th century when the rise of Romantic nationalist movements in Western Europe led to renewed interest in the ancient Celts. In particular, the independence of Belgium in 1830 spurred a search for Belgian national heroes which led Boduognatus to be reinterpreted as a symbol of national resistance along with Ambiorix, a Belgic figure who similarly resisted the Roman invasion from 54–53 BC.

=== Depictions in culture ===
- The asteroid 3458 Boduognat, was named in honor of Boduognatus by Belgian astronomer Henri Debehogne following its discovery in 1985..
- A statue of Boduognatus was created by Joseph Ducaju in 1861. It stood on Leopoldlei (today Belgiëlei) and Nerviërsstraat in Antwerp, Belgium until 1954 when the city council had the monument removed. The head of the monument was preserved and is on display at the Middelheim Open Air Sculpture Museum.

== Gallery ==
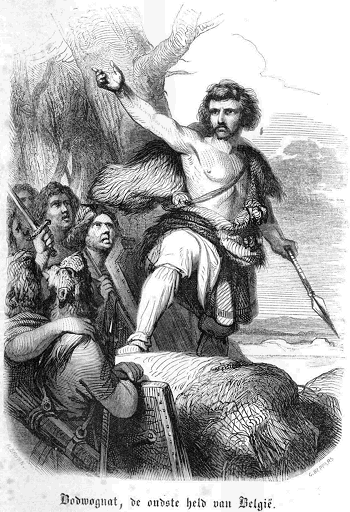
"Bodwognat, oldest hero of the Belgians", depicted by Gustave Wappers for the book Geschiedenis van België by Hendrik Conscience (1845)

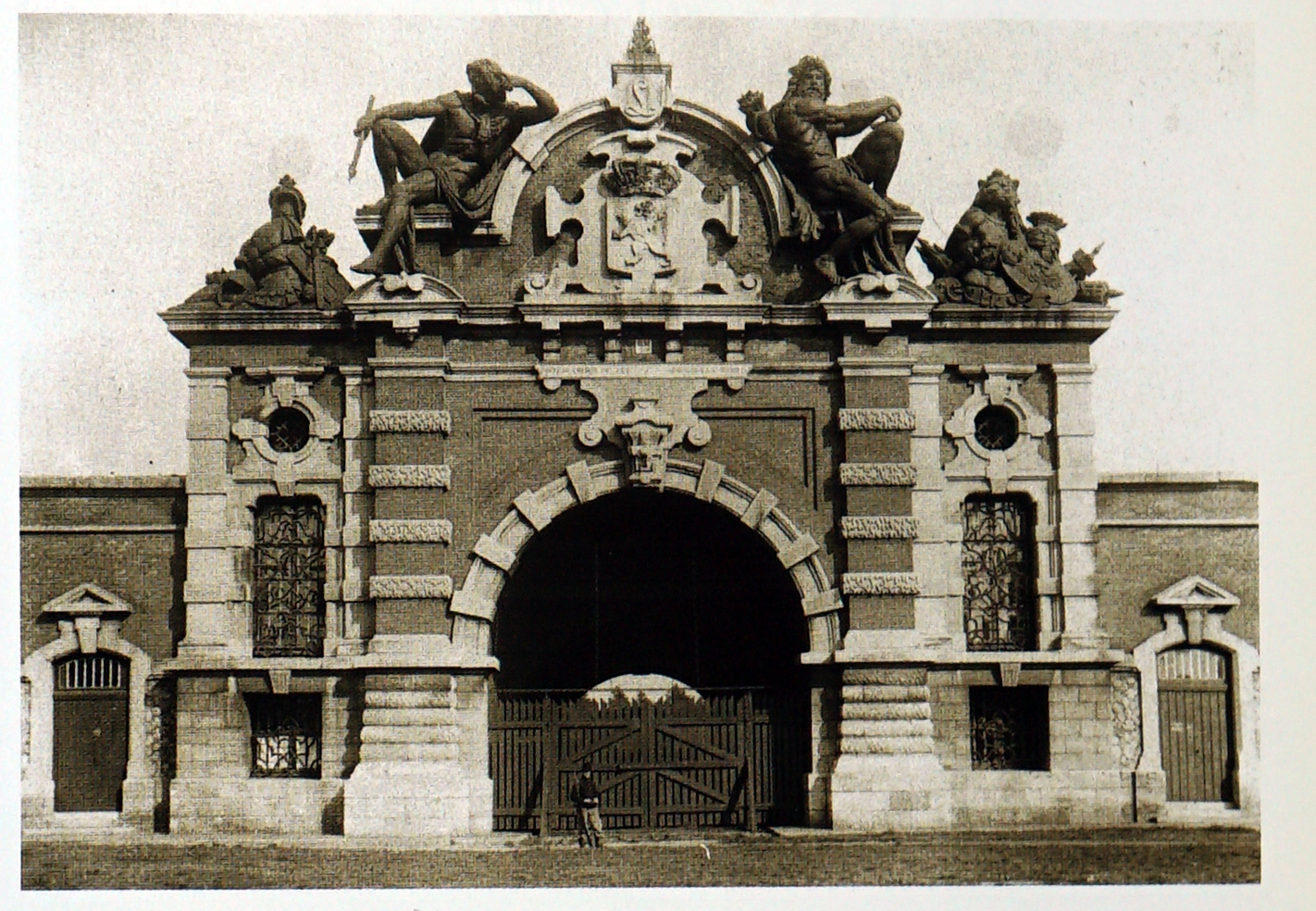
Bronze statue of Boduognat (left) by Armand Cattier next to a statue of Ambiorix (right) by Félix Bouré atop the Spoorbaanpoort at the Brialmont forts, Antwerp, Belgium
