= Pleumoxii =

Ancient Gallic tribe

The Pleumoxii or Pleumosii were a small Belgic tribe living in Gallia Belgica during the Iron Age. They were clients of the most powerful Nervii.

== Name ==
They are attested as Pleumoxii by Caesar (mid-1st c. BC).

Early modern humanists used Pleumosia and Pleumosii to refer respectively to Flanders and the Flemish. The poem Pleumosia, composed in 1620 by Elias Gifford about the Battle of Nieuwpoort (1600), applies the name Pleumosia to the region in which the battle was fought. The Greek form Pleumósioi (Πλευμοσίοι) appears in the Greek translation of De Bello Gallico, first printed alongside the Latin text in 1606. This usage persisted into the 19th century, when some translations, such as that of William Duncan, rendered Pleumoxii as "Pleumosians".

== Geography ==
Based on Caesar's account, their territory was located somewhere in the vicinity of Nervian territory.

== History ==
During the Gallic Wars (58–50 BC), they are cited by Caesar as clients of the Nervii.

They therefore immediately sent messengers to the Ceutrones, Grudii, Levaci, Pleumoxii, Geidumni, all of whom were held under their control, then collected the largest contingents they could and swooped unexpectedly on Cicero’s winter quarters

— Caesar, Gallic Wars, V 39
