= Levaci =

Ancient Gallic tribe

The Levaci were a small Belgic tribe living in Gallia Belgica during the Iron Age. They were clients of the most powerful Nervii.

== Name ==
They are attested as Levaci by Caesar (mid-1st c. BC).

The ethnic name Levaci is a Latinized form of Gaulish Leuacoi (sing. Leuacos). It derives from the stem leuo- (perhaps 'slippery, slow') attached to the suffix -āco- ('belonging to'). It probably originally refers to a river, which would yield Levaci as 'those of the river Leva'.

The village of Lèves (south of Namur) is named after the tribe.

== Geography ==
Based on Caesar's account, their territory was located somewhere in the vicinity of Nervian territory.

== History ==
During the Gallic Wars (58–50 BC), they are cited by Caesar as clients of the Nervii.

They therefore immediately sent messengers to the Ceutrones, Grudii, Levaci, Pleumoxii, Geidumni, all of whom were held under their control, then collected the largest contingents they could and swooped unexpectedly on Cicero’s winter quarters

— Caesar, Gallic Wars, V 39
