= Ceutrones =

Ceutrones may refer to:

- Ceutrones (Belgica), ancient Celtic tribe of Belgica
- Ceutrones (Alps), ancient Celtic tribe of Alpina
