= Grudii =

Ancient Gallic tribe

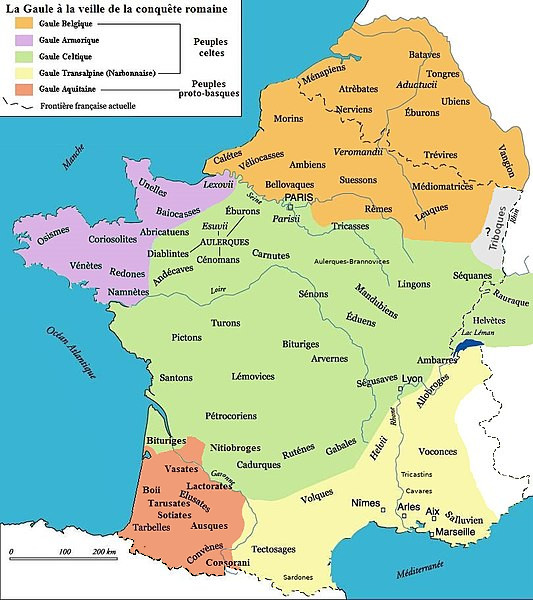
Maps of the Gaulish and Aquitanian peoples

The Grudii were a small Belgic tribe living in Gallia Belgica during the Iron Age. They were clients of the most powerful Nervii.

== Name ==
They are attested as Grudii by Caesar (mid-1st c. BC).

== Geography ==
Based on Caesar's account, their territory was located somewhere in the vicinity of Nervian territory.

== History ==
During the Gallic Wars (58–50 BC), they are cited by Caesar as clients of the Nervii.

They therefore immediately sent messengers to the Ceutrones, Grudii, Levaci, Pleumoxii, Geidumni, all of whom were held under their control, then collected the largest contingents they could and swooped unexpectedly on Cicero’s winter quarters

— Caesar, Gallic Wars, V 39
