= Aylesford-Swarling pottery =

Aylesford-Swarling pottery is part of a tradition of wheel-thrown pottery distributed around Kent, Essex, Hertfordshire and Bedfordshire and named after two cemeteries in Kent dating to the 1st century BC. The tradition reached Britain with the so-called Belgic invasion of the 1st century BC and may also be loosely termed Belgic ware. Whether there was actual migration, or how much, or whether "this culture developed because of the proximity of Roman trading systems, rather than a wholesale movement of continental peoples" remains the subject of debate.

A cemetery of the British Iron Age discovered in 1886 at Aylesford in Kent was excavated under the leadership of Sir Arthur Evans, and published in 1890. With the later excavation by others at Swarling not far away (discovery to publication was 1921–1925) this is the type site for Aylesford-Swarling pottery or the Aylesford-Swarling culture, which included the first wheel-made pottery in Britain. Evans' conclusion that the site belonged to a culture closely related to the continental Belgae, remains the modern view, though the dating has been refined to the period after about 75 BC. His analysis of the site was still regarded as "an outstanding contribution to Iron Age studies" with "a masterly consideration of the metalwork" by Sir Barry Cunliffe in 2012.

== Characteristics ==
Vessels are generally wheel-thrown, and show cordons (strips of clay added around the pot), 'corrugation', and zones of combed or 'furrowed' decoration. Shapes may be angular or rounded, often with pedestal or foot-ring bases. The use of grog temper was extensive, though not universal.
