= Bellovaci =

Belgic tribe

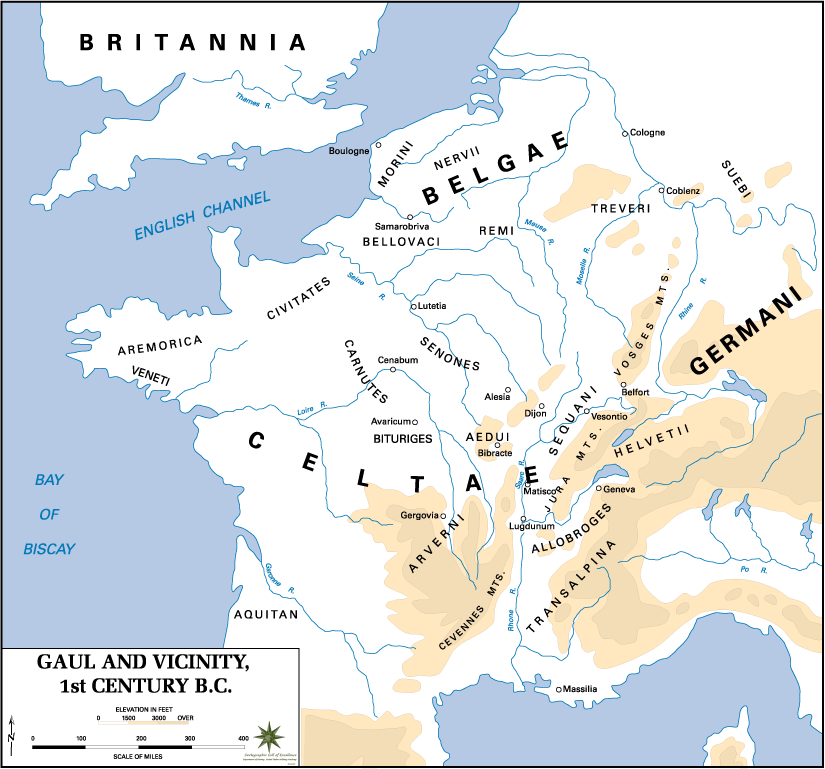
A map of Gaul in the 1st century BC, showing the relative position of the Bellovaci tribe.

The Bellovaci (Gaulish: Bellouacoi) were a Belgic tribe dwelling in the modern Picardy region, near the present-day city of Beauvais, during the Iron Age and the Roman period. After they were defeated by Caesar in 57 BC, they gave lukewarm support to the Gallic revolt led by Vercingetorix in 52 BC. The Bellovaci nonetheless organized resistance against Rome in 51 BC.

== Name ==
They are mentioned as Bellovacos and Bellovaci by Caesar (mid-1st c. BC), Belloákoi (Βελλοάκοι) by Strabo (early 1st c. AD), Bellovaci by Pliny (1st c. AD), and as Belloúakoi (Βελλούακοι) by Ptolemy (2nd c. AD).

The ethnonym Bellovacī is a latinized form of Gaulish Bellouacoi (sing. Bellouacos). The latter derives from the stem bello- ('strong, forceful'), but the translation of the suffix -uaco- is uncertain. It could mean 'curved' (cf. Lat. uaccilare), or else be related to the Irish fachain ('striving') and the Scottish Gaelic fachail ('fight, strife').

The city of Beauvais, attested ca. 400 AD as civitas Bellovacorum ('civitas of the Bellovaci', Belvacus in 874, Biauvais in 1132), is named after the Belgic tribe.

== Geography ==
The territory of the Bellovaci was located in the Thérain valley, south of the Ambiani. They dominated on wooded heights, which constituted a natural frontier with the Veliocasses. To the east lived the more powerful Suessiones, who were probably able to contain potential expansions of the Bellovaci beyond the Oise river.

The capital of their civitas was known as Caesaromagus (present-day Beauvais) during the Roman era. The Bellovaci most likely controlled the hill-fort Gournay-sur-Aronde, in which sanctuary may have been a site of fairs welcoming the Ambiani and Viromandui.

== Economy ==
Their territory straddled the route from the Seine to the Somme valleys. They were clients of the Aedui in central Gaul by the first century BC. The lack of specific gold coinage related to the Bellovaci also suggests a moderate economic power.

== History ==
=== Roman conquest ===
This campaign occurred in the Compiègne Forest, in an area that had been occupied by the Suessiones. The Bellovaci intended to conquer this territory, a situation that Julius Caesar feared would expand into a greater threat and he decided it would be useful to intervene to prove Roman superiority.

Bellovaci employed guerrilla warfare, in particular targeting Roman foragers. Meanwhile, Caesar's strategic plan was to draw the Bellovaci forces out into open ground.

==== Conquest ====
Caesar ordered troops into the territory of the Suessiones, but chose to confront the Bellovaci himself. The Bellovaci, led by Correus, camped at Mount St. Marc, intending to attack head on if Caesar brought three legions, and to use guerrilla tactics if he brought more. The Roman camp was located at Mount St. Pierre, and heavily fortified with two ditches and two lines of defences. The events of this campaign were recorded by Aulus Hirtius, though his findings do not entirely correspond with the geography of the region – he provided only that the Bellovaci camped at a "high wooded place surrounded by marsh".

The Bellovaci were surprised by the arrival of Roman troops, and Julius Caesar was intimidated by the size of enemy forces, even though he (Caesar) had a large force of about 30,000 men with him, including four legions, tribes, and a few baggage trains. Neither initiated battle.

The battles were initially small confrontations with varying success across the marsh surrounding Bellovaci territory. The Belgic warriors set traps in the woods for Roman foragers, and maintained an immensely advantageous position to the point that Caesar was forced to call for reinforcements of three legions from Trebonius. Intimidated by the pending arrival of Roman reinforcements and fearing a siege, Correus sent many of his battle-incapable troops to escape in the night. They accomplished this successfully, though Caesar's troops may have been able to catch them had they attempted to intervene.

==== Defeat and post-conquest period ====
Eventually, Caesar built a bridge and crossed the marsh by Mount St. Marc, positioning his troops within missile range of the Bellovaci camp. Correus and the Bellovaci retreated in the night to a stronger camp 10 miles away, using a line of fire to blind the Roman troops, leaving traps in their wake to impede Roman pursuit. Correus then attempted an ambush on Caesar's troops, though not their entire number, sending about 6000 of his men to a spot where he believed Caesar would forage for food. Caesar heard of this, although it is not clear how, and had reinforcements ready to attack once the ambush was set off; however, by the time he arrived, the Bellovaci were defeated, and their general Correus killed. After the battle, the Bellovaci were allegedly impressed by Caesar's clemency, which was secured through unclear means by Diviciacus; according to the Bello Gallico the leaders of the revolt fled to Britain.
