= Ambiani =

Belgic tribe

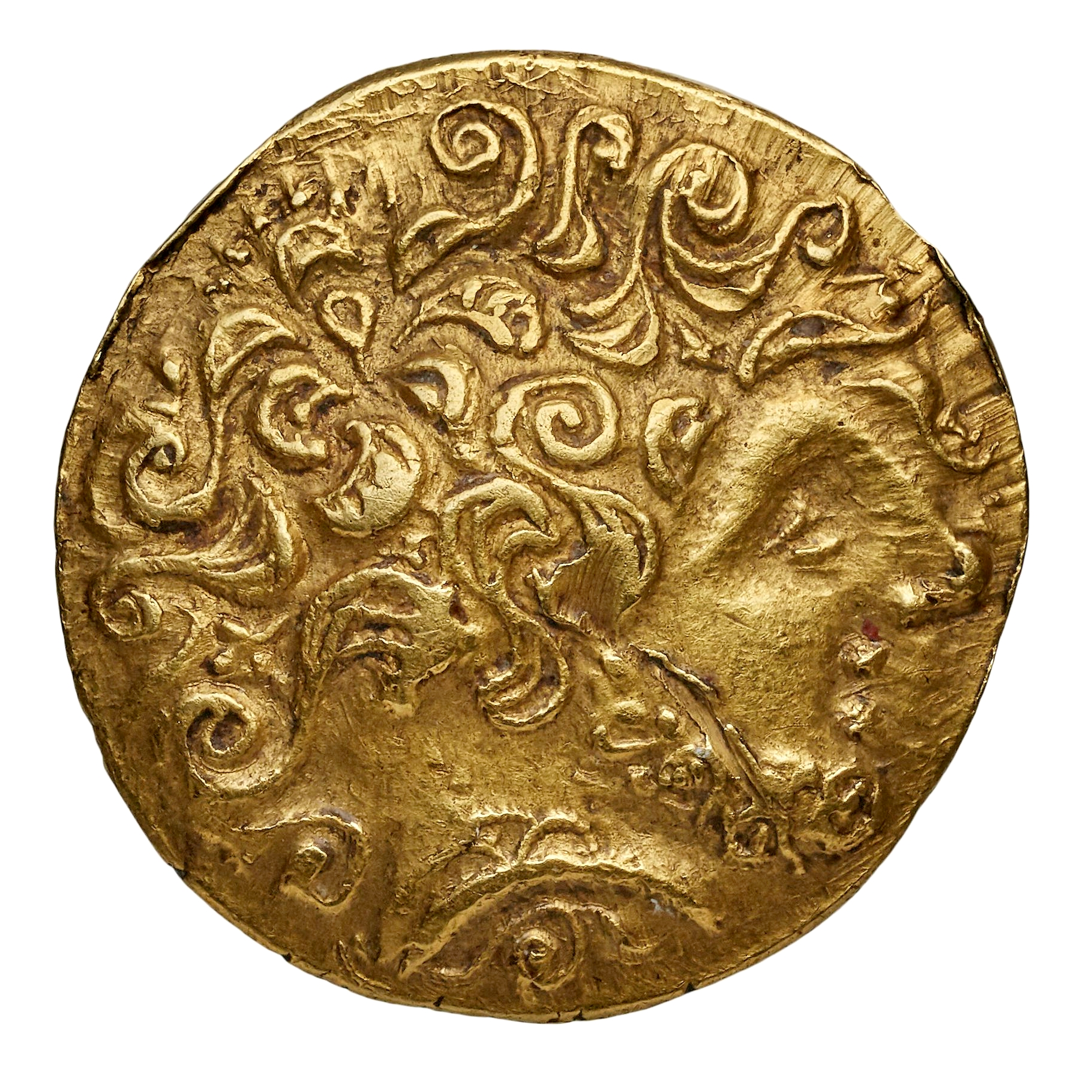
Ambiani hemi stater. Stylized head.

The Ambiani (Gaulish: Ambiāni, 'those around') were a Belgic coastal tribe dwelling in the modern Picardy region during the Iron Age and Roman periods.

They settled in the region between the 4th century and the second part of the 2nd century BC. In 113–101 BC, they took part in the fights against the Cimbri and Teutoni invaders during the Cimbrian War. In 57 and 52 BC, they participated in Gallic coalitions against Caesar, before their eventual subjugation by Rome in 51 BC. The Ambiani are known for their gold coinage, found in both northern France and Britain, which attest of extensive trading relations across the Channel.

== Name ==
They are mentioned as Ambianos and Ambianis by Caesar (mid-1st c. BC), Ambianos in the summary of Livy's Ab Urbe Condita Libri (late 1st c. BC), Ambianoì (Ἀμβιανοὶ) and Ambianoĩs (Ἀμβιανοῖς) by Strabo (early 1st c. AD), Ambiani by Pliny (1st c. AD), Ambianoí (Ἀμβιανοί) by Ptolemy (2nd c. AD), Ambianis in the Itinerarium Antonini (early 3rd c. AD), and as Ambianenses in the Notitia Dignitatum (5th c. AD).

The Gaulish ethnonym Ambiāni literally means 'those around', which is generally interpreted as meaning 'the people dwelling around the two banks of the Somme river'; it is formed with the stem ambi- ('around, on both sides') attached to a suffix -ani. Linguist Pierre-Yves Lambert has also proposed to translate the name as 'the people of the surroundings' – perhaps hyperbolized as 'the people of the world' –, by deriving Ambiani from ambio- ('surroundings'), a thematized form of the same prefix ambi-.

The city of Amiens, attested ca. 400 AD as civitas Ambianensium ('civitas of the Ambiani'; Ammiens in 1142), is named after the Belgic tribe.

== Geography ==
=== Territory ===
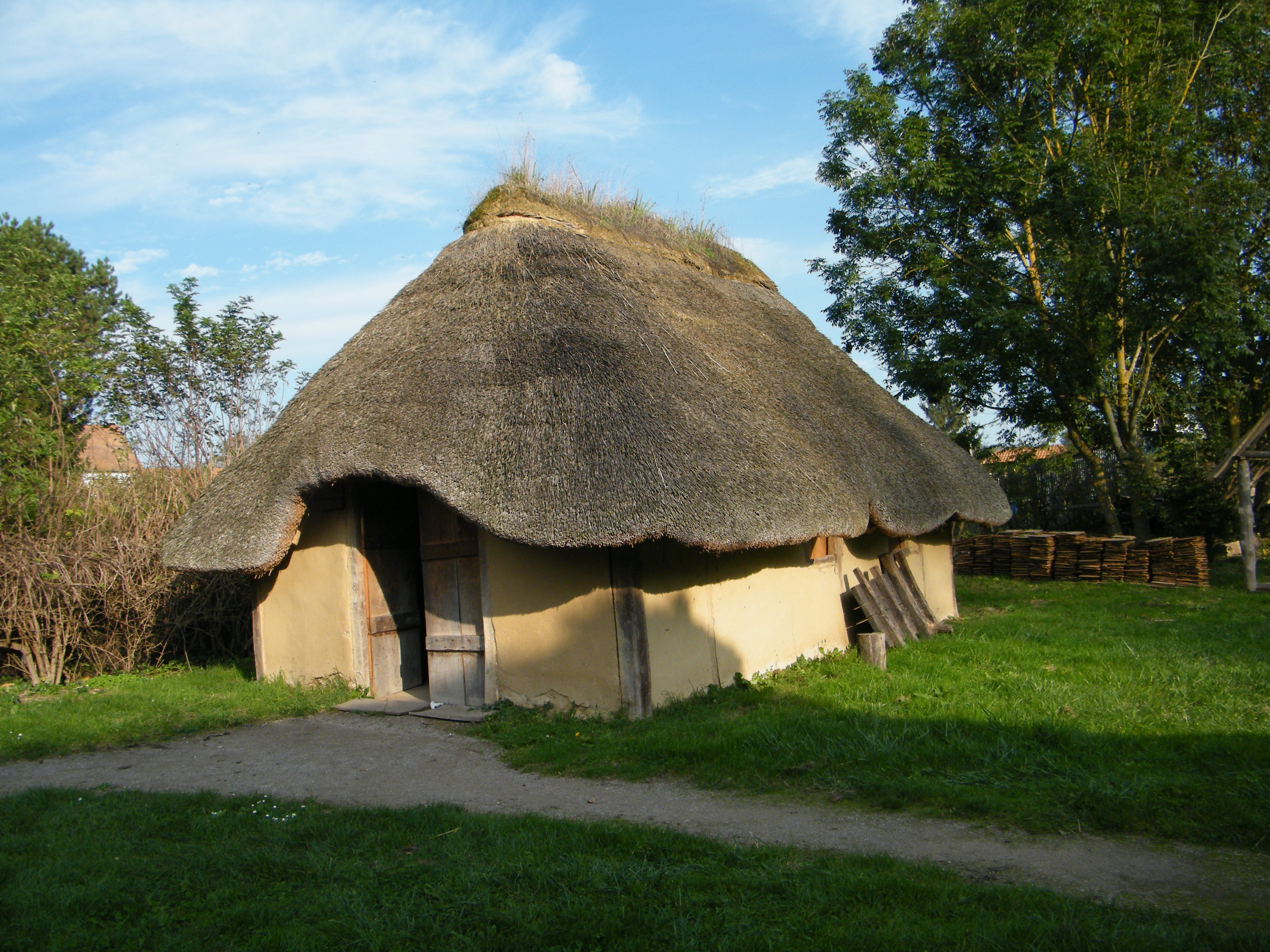
Reconstructed Ambiani house. Pont-Rémy, Somme.

The Ambiani dwelled in the modern regions of Vimeux, Ponthieu and Santerre, in the present-day Somme department. Their territory was bordered in the north by the Canche river, and in the north-east and south-east by the Samara (Somme) watershed. They were located near the Caletes in the west, the Bellovaci in the south, the Morini and Atrebates in the north, and the Viromandui in the east. The smaller Catuslougi, who lived between them and the Caletes, were probably a pagus of the Ambiani during the Roman period.

During the pre-Roman period, the area around Samarobriva (Amiens) was probably located at the extremity of the Ambianian territory, which extended mainly on the lower Somme valley.

=== Settlements ===
During the Roman era, the chief town of the Ambiani was known as Samarobriva (Gaulish: 'bridge on the river Somme'), corresponding to the modern-day city of Amiens. Despite the mention of a Samarobrivae by Caesar ca. 54 BC, archeological evidence indicate that the settlement was built around a Via Agrippa, probably ca. 19–16 BC. Suburbs began to emerge from the middle of the 1st century AD in the lower valley.

== History ==
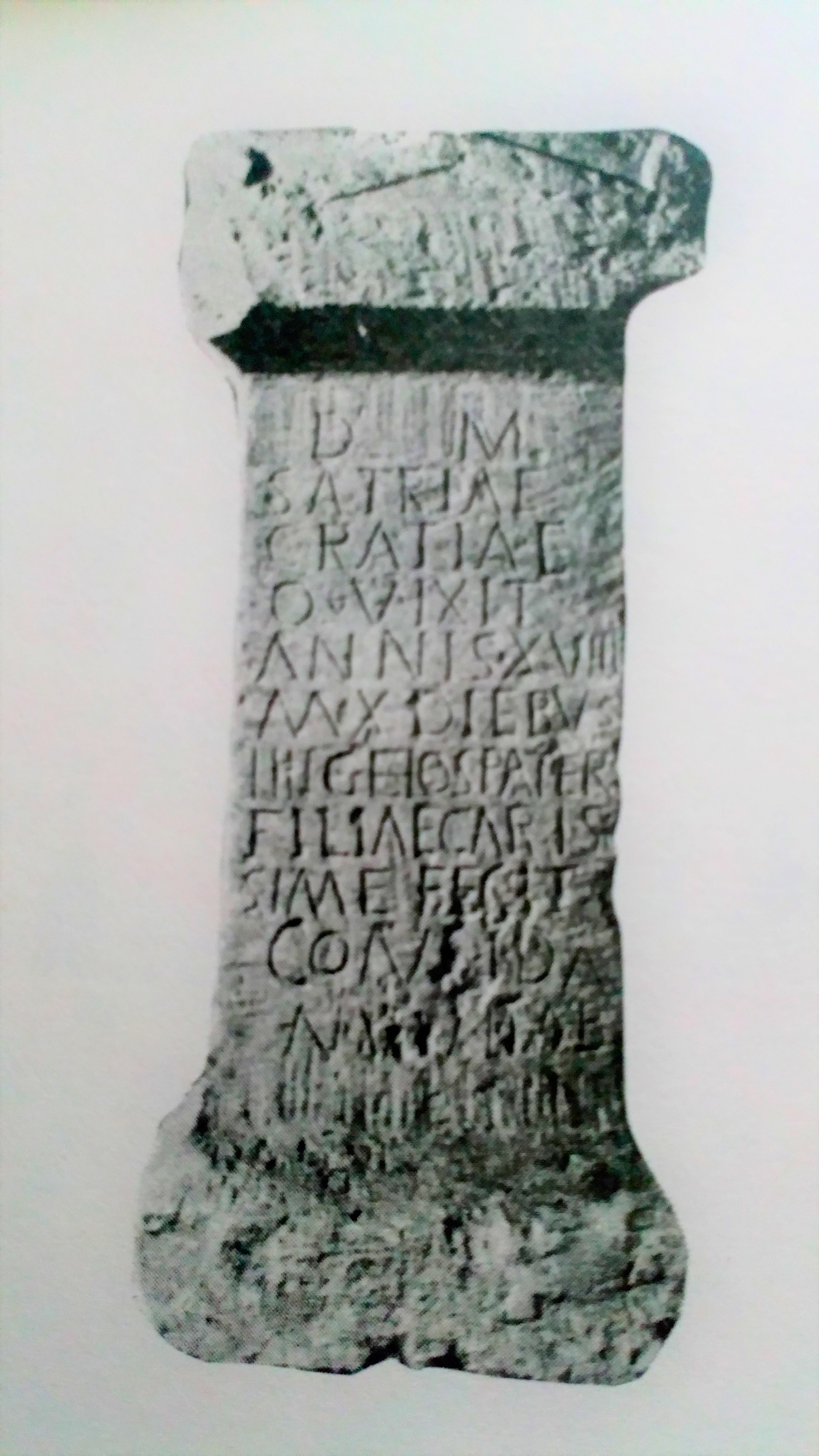
Funerary stelae from Samarobriva.

The Ambiani settled in their attested homeland between the 4th century and the middle of the 2nd century BC. In 113–101 BC, they participated in the fights against the Cimbri and Teutoni invaders of Gauls during the Cimbrian War.

During the Gallic Wars in 57 BC, Caesar learnt from his Belgic Remi informants that the Ambiani had promised to muster 10,000 armed men against the Roman armies, among the lowest.

An equal number were promised by the Nervii, accounted the fiercest among the Belgae, and dwelling farthest away; fifteen thousand by the Atrebates, ten by the Ambiani...

— Caesar 1917. Commentarii de Bello Gallico. 2:4.

During the winter of 54–53 BC, returning from an expedition in Britain, Caesar wintered with three legions at Samarobriva. When Vercingetorix was besieged in Alesia in 52 BC, the Ambiani sent 5,000 men.

Between 386 and 450 AD, they are still documented by the Notitia Galliarum as living in the province of Belgica II, between the Bellovaci and the Morini.

== Religion ==
There is some evidence from coins that bear a stag on one side and a betorced head on the obverse that the Ambiani were followers of the god Cernunnos (horned God).

== Economy ==
The Ambiani were consummate minters, especially of gold coins. Whereas other Gallic tribes generally imitated Arverni coins, themselves inspired by Philip II of Macedon staters, the Ambiani imitated coinages from Magna Graecia, in the southern part of the Italian Peninsula. Their first emissions of coins are thus copies of a stater minted by Taranto between 334 and 302 BC.

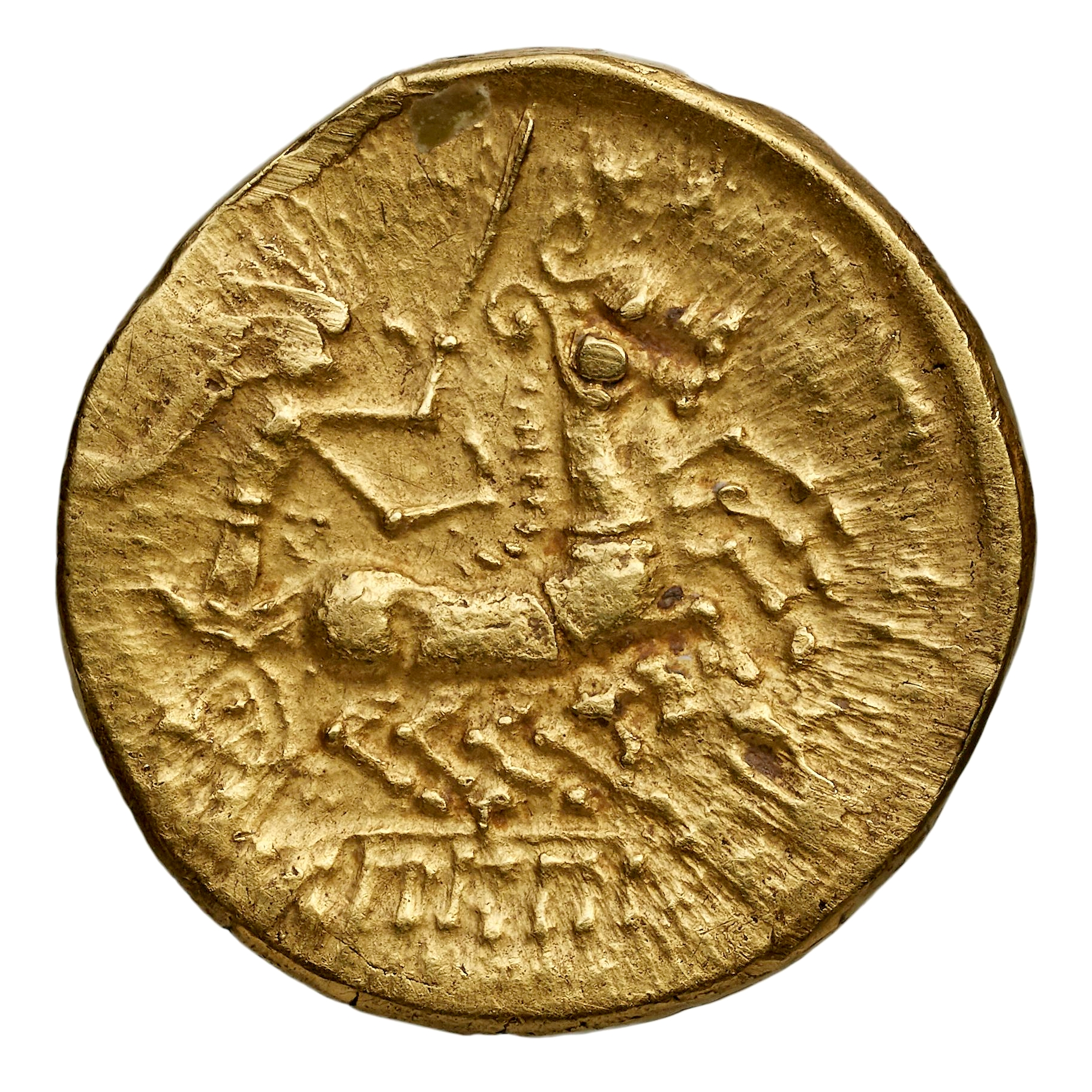
Ambiani gold stater. An auriga driving a biga.

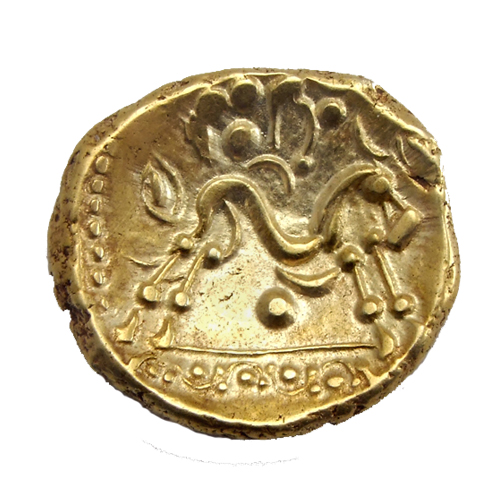
Ambiani gold stater. Celticised horse.

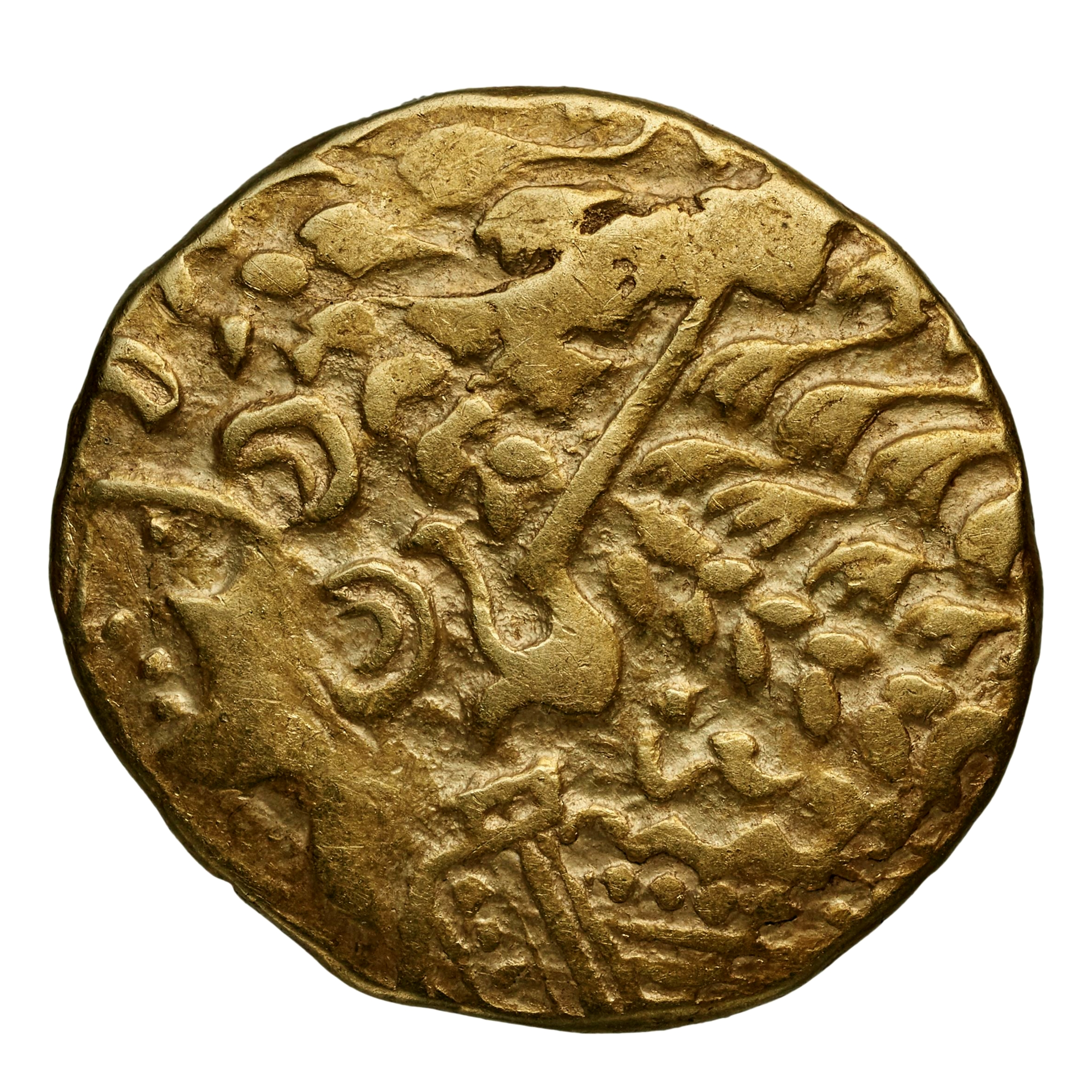
Ambiani gold stater. Stylized head.

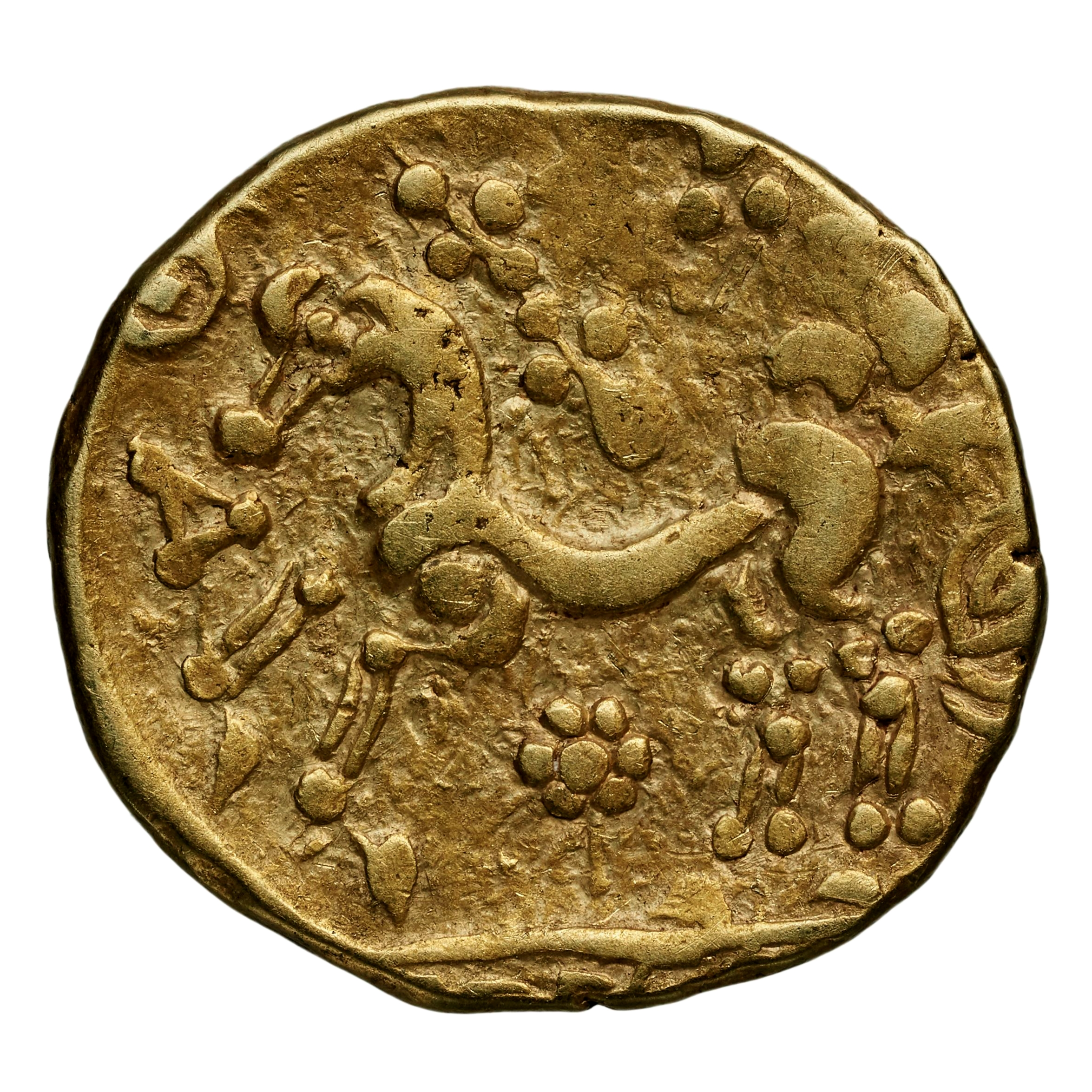
Ambiani gold stater. Stylized horse.

Ambianic coinage has been found throughout the territories of other Belgic tribes, including in the British Island, from Cantium (Kent) to the West Country. An Ambianic "monetary hegemony" over the neighbouring Parisii and Bellovaci is attested at least until the end of the 2nd century BC.
