= Nervii =

Belgic tribe

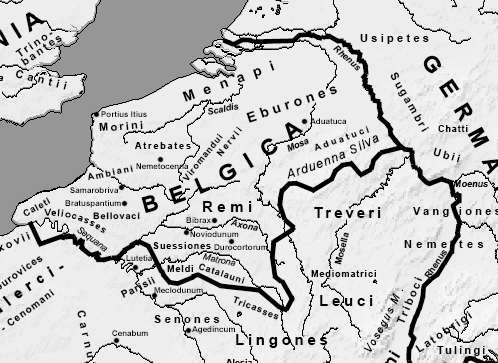
A map of Belgic Gaul in the first century BC, showing the relative position of the Nervii

The Nervii or Nervians were one of the most powerful tribes of the Belgae in northern Gaul at the time of its conquest by Julius Caesar in 58-52 BC. The core of their territory corresponded to the medieval County of Hainaut and contained a significant part of modern central Belgium, and stretched southwards to Cambrai in what is now France. During his campaign, Caesar's contacts among the Remi reported that the Nervii were the most warlike of the Belgae, trekking long distances to take part in battles. Like the other tribes of northern Gaul, including the Menapii to the west, and the Eburones to the east, the Nervii were considered by Caesar to be relatively uncorrupted by civilization.

The Nervians were later integrated into the Roman Empire.

== Name and language ==
They are referred to as Nervii by Caesar (mid-1st c. BC) and Orosius (early fifth c. AD), Neroúioi (Νερούιοι) by Strabo (early first c. AD), Nerui by Pliny (1st c. AD) and the Notitia Dignitatum (5th c. AD), Nervios by Tacitus (early second c. AD), and as Neroúsioi (Νερούσιοι) by Ptolemy (2nd c. AD).

The ethnonym Nervii probably stems from the Western Indo-European root *ner-, meaning 'man' (cf. Middle Welsh ner 'lord, chief'). It appears to be cognate with the Latin cognomen Nerva.

Although it is often assumed that the Nervii spoke a Celtic language, the evidence regarding their linguistic affiliation is inconclusive. The same applies to other Belgian tribes, like the Menapii and Morini, to the west of the Nervii on the English Channel, and the Germani cisrhenani to the east of the Nervii, stretching to the Rhine.

Caesar writes that the Belgae generally had received immigration from Germanic people from east of the Rhine. The Romanized Greek Strabo wrote that the Nervii were of Germanic origin. Tacitus, in his book Germania, says that in his time the Nervii and Treveri both claimed Germanic ancestry, similar to that of their mutual neighbours the Tungri, in order to distinguish them from the weaknesses of the Gauls.

The Romans were not precise in their ethnography of northern barbarians: by "Germanic" Caesar may simply have meant "originating east of the Rhine" with no distinction of language intended. During Caesar's lifetime, Germanic languages east of the Rhine may have been no closer than the river Elbe. It has instead been argued based on place name studies that the older language of the area, though apparently Indo-European, was also not Celtic (see Nordwestblock) and that Celtic, though influential amongst the elite, might never have been the main language of the part of the Belgic area north of the Ardennes. On the other hand, these same studies of placenames such as those of Maurits Gysseling, have also shown evidence of Germanic languages entering the Belgic area north of the Ardennes, before the Roman conquest, while strong evidence for old Celtic place names is found in the Ardennes and to the south of them. Luc van Durme summarizes competing evidence of Celtic and Germanic influence at the time of Caesar by saying that "one has to accept the rather remarkable conclusion that Caesar must have witnessed a situation opposing Celtic and Germanic in Belgium, in a territory slightly more to the south than the early medieval Romance–Germanic language border", but van Durme also accepts that "second century BC Germanisation did not block the celtisation coming from the south . . . but that both phenomena were simultaneous and interfering instead".

== Territory ==
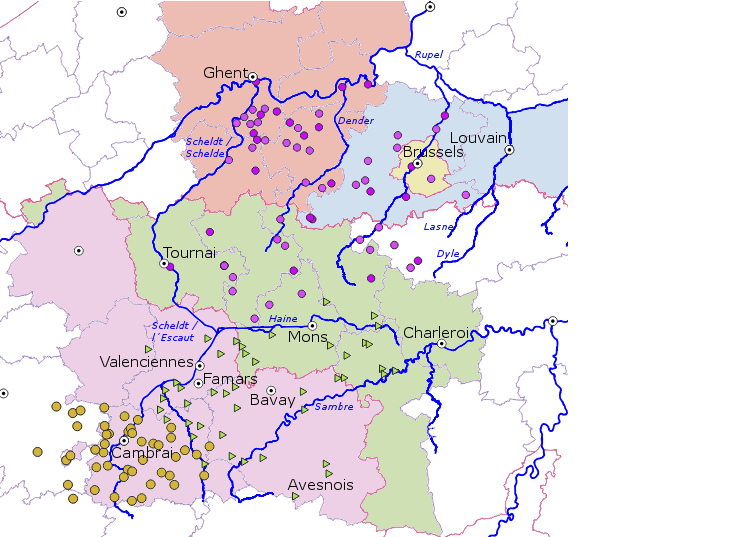
The three main early medieval pagi in the civitas of the Nervians, based on Deru's listing. Pagi: Orange = Cambrésis; Yellow = Hainaut; Purple = Brabant. The shaded areas are modern Belgian provinces or French départements.

According to Xavier Deru, the core region of the Nervii was equivalent to the medieval pagus of Hainaut, the region of the Haine river, the upper Sambre, and greater and lesser Helpe rivers. To the north of the Haine, it also included what would become the medieval pagus of Brabant, making its northwestern border on the Scheldt (French Escaut, Dutch Schelde) river. A large population occupied the southern territories, near the river Sambre with the biggest being at Avesnelles, near Avesnes-sur-Helpe.

An oppidum found near Asse may have belonged to them but it was isolated and near to the territory of the Menapii. In the south the Nervians stretched no further than the forests of Arrouaise and Thiérache South of them were the Viromandui, south of Cambrai, and the Remi. Deru proposes that the region or pagus of Cambrai in the southwest was relatively undeveloped until Roman times.

To the east, based upon medieval boundaries it is likely that the Nervii's territories stretched to the Dyle and the Eau d'Heure. Some of this territory especially in the north may have been added to the district during Roman times according to Deru. The civitas of the Nervii did not include Louvain or Namur.

Caesar also mentions smaller tribes who were expected to contribute troops to Nervian forces; Levaci, Pleumoxii, Geidumni, Ceutrones, and Grudii. None of these can be convincingly located.

In the Middle Ages, Hainaut was sometimes still referred to as the county of the Nervians (comitatus nerviensis) in medieval Latin, and when this came to be politically united with mainly Dutch speaking Brabant again, the counties were still distinguished in the official Latin titles (comitatus Nerviensis atque Bracbatensis).

Today, Hainaut is divided between France and Belgium. To its north, parts of the modern Belgian provinces of Antwerp, East Flanders, Flemish Brabant and French-speaking Walloon Brabant include the rest of the old Nervian territory.

== Culture ==
Julius Caesar considered the Nervii to be the most warlike of the Belgic tribes, and that the Belgic tribes were the bravest in Gaul. He says that their culture was a Spartan one: they would not partake of alcoholic beverages or any other such luxury, feeling that the mind must remain clear to be brave. He also says they disliked foreign trade and neither had a merchant class nor would permit merchants within their territory.

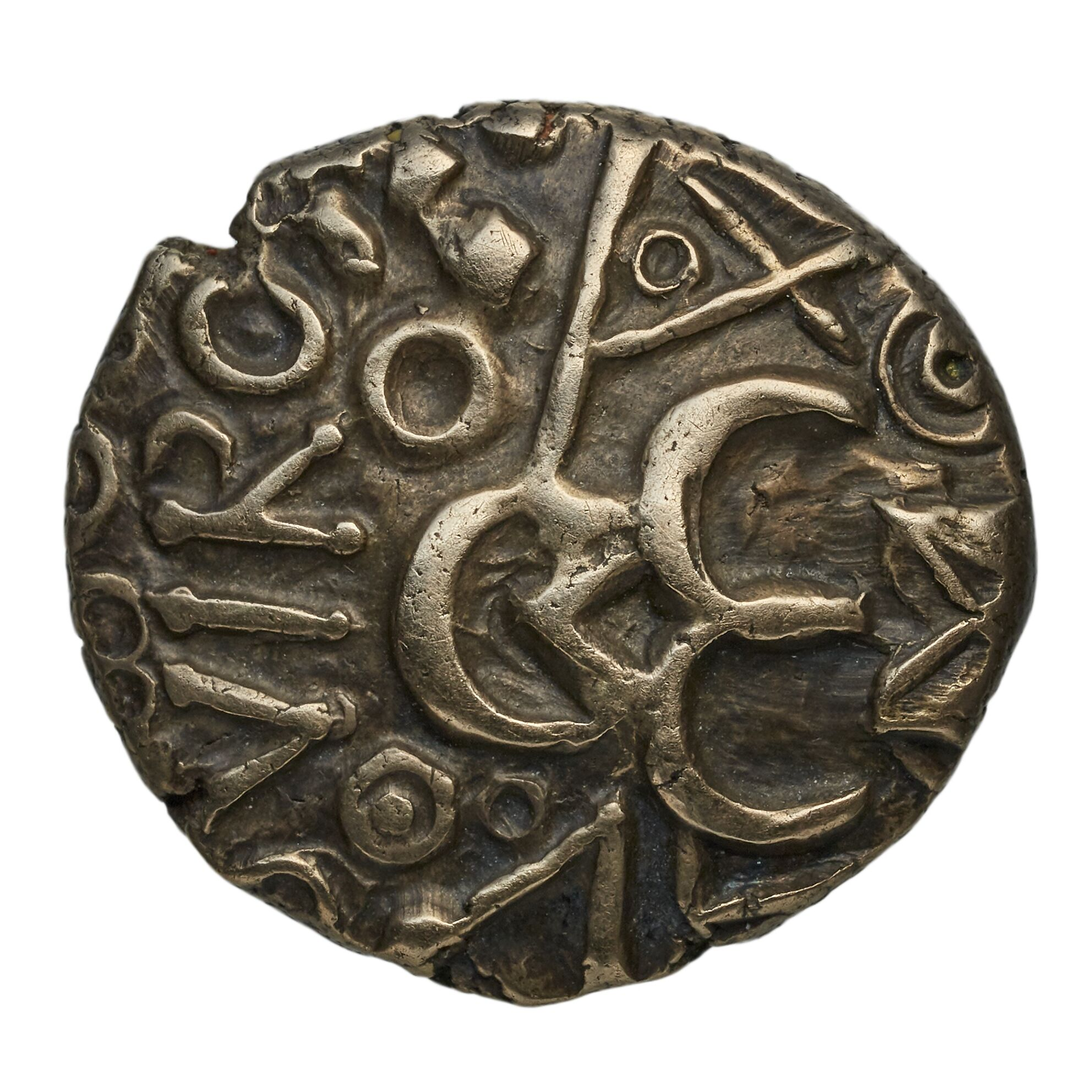
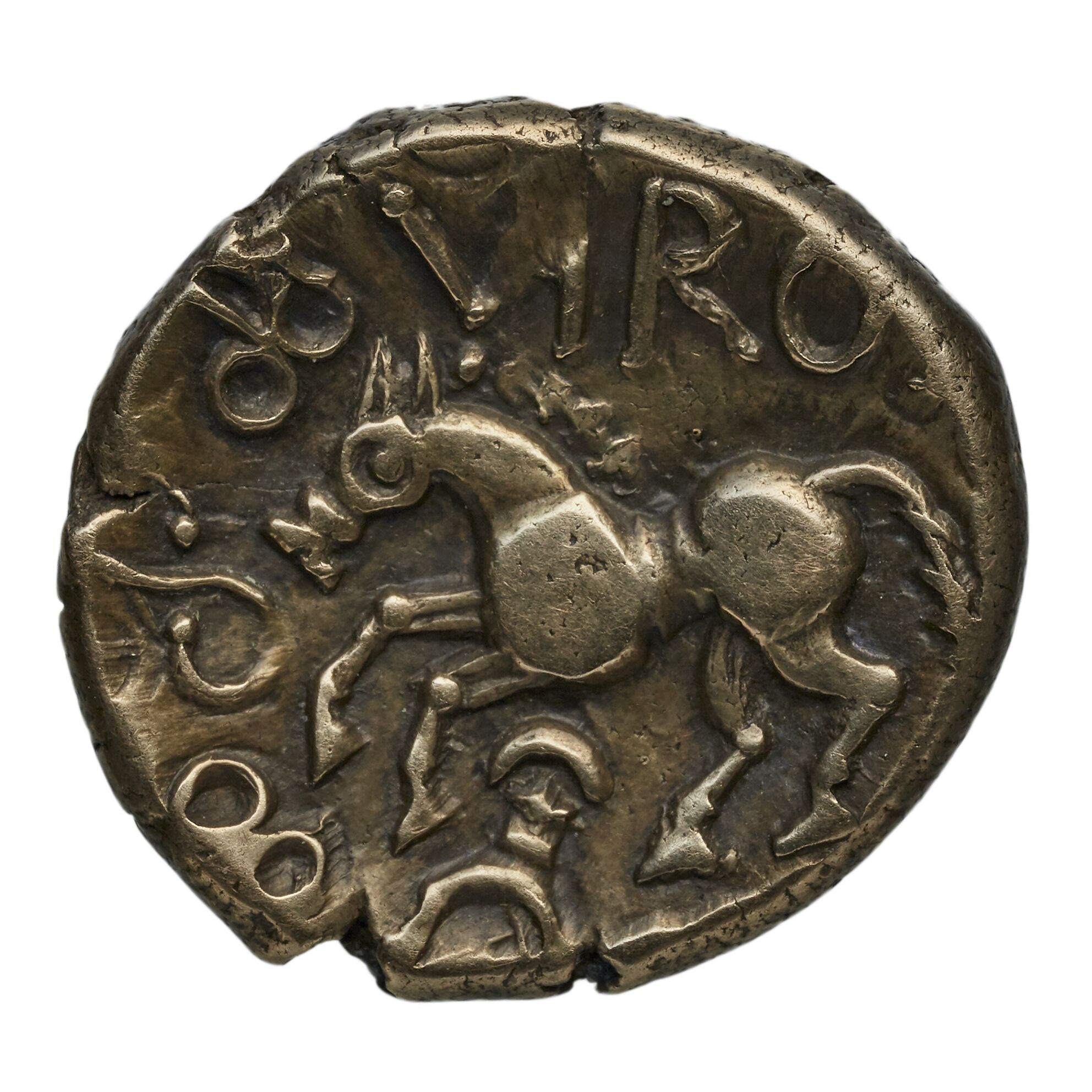
Gold stater of the Nervii presenting a geometrically deconstructed head with the characteristic 'epsilon' shape predominant on the obverse, and a horse on the reverse with the inscription VIROS

Archaeologists have sought to define the territories of the northern Belgic tribes by looking at the coins they used. The Nervii produced a stater on which the obverse features a design that resembles a Greek epsilon.

Remarkably, given the archaeological evidence of a Celtic La Tène culture having been present in the pre-Roman past, Caesar reports that the Nervii had no cavalry. In fact they established hedges throughout their lands in order to make them difficult for cavalry.

The Frasnes hoard, accidentally unearthed by foresters in 1864 near Frasnes-lez-Buissenal in Hainaut, along with coins attributed to the Morini and the Nervii, also contained characteristically Gallic gold torques, one of which was in Alastair Bradley Martin's Guennol collection.

== Gallic Wars ==
The Nervii were part of the Belgic alliance that resisted Julius Caesar in 57 BC. After the alliance broke up and some tribes surrendered, the Nervii, under the command of Boduognatus and aided by the Atrebates and Viromandui, came very close to defeating Caesar (the Atuatuci had also agreed to join them but did not arrive in time). In 57 BC at the battle of the Sabis (now identified as the river Selle, near modern Saulzoir; previously identified as the Sambre), they concealed themselves in the forests and attacked the approaching Roman column at the river. Their attack was so quick and unexpected that some of the Romans didn't have time to take the covers off their shields or even put on their helmets. The element of surprise briefly left the Romans exposed. However Caesar grabbed a shield, made his way to the front line, and quickly organised his forces; at the same time, the commander of the tenth legion, Titus Labienus, attacked the Nervian camp. The two legions who had been guarding the baggage train at the rear arrived and helped to turn the tide of the battle. Caesar says the Nervii were almost annihilated in the battle and is effusive in his tribute to their bravery, calling them "heroes".

When Ambiorix and the Eburones rebelled in 53 BC, the remaining Nervii joined the uprising and besieged Quintus Tullius Cicero – brother of the orator – and his legion in their winter camp until they were relieved by Caesar in person. They were able to rapidly build a rampart around the Roman fortification, using only swords to dig, "in less than three hours they completed a fortification of ten miles in circumference; and during the rest of the days they began to prepare and construct towers of the height of the ramparts, and grappling irons, and mantelets". Caesar reported that this technique was learned from the Romans, and under the advisor of captured Roman soldiers.

On the seventh day of the attack, a very high wind having sprung up, they began to discharge by their slings hot balls made of burned or hardened clay, and heated javelins, upon the huts, which, after the Gallic custom, were thatched with straw. These quickly took fire, and by the violence of the wind, scattered their flames in every part of the camp.

The situation was recovered when a Nervian in the Roman camp was able to send a slave with a message, who managed to remain inconspicuous and get it to Caesar. Caesar was able to amass forces and defeat some of the Nervians.

The Nervii and their allies, the Aduatuci, Eburones, Treveri and Menapii continued to prepare for war with the Romans, and sought assistance from the Germanic peoples east of the Rhine. The Roman struck a significant blow when they killed the Treveran king Indutiomarus. Soon after:

Accordingly, while the winter was not yet ended, having concentrated the four nearest legions, he marched unexpectedly into the territories of the Nervii, and before they could either assemble or retreat, after capturing a large number of cattle and of men, and wasting their lands and giving up that booty to the soldiers, compelled them to enter into a surrender and give him hostages.

In the final phase of Caesar's war in Gaul, the Nervii were called upon to contribute to the large allied force of Vercingetorix which amassed at Alesia, but these were defeated in the Battle of Alesia.

== Roman period ==
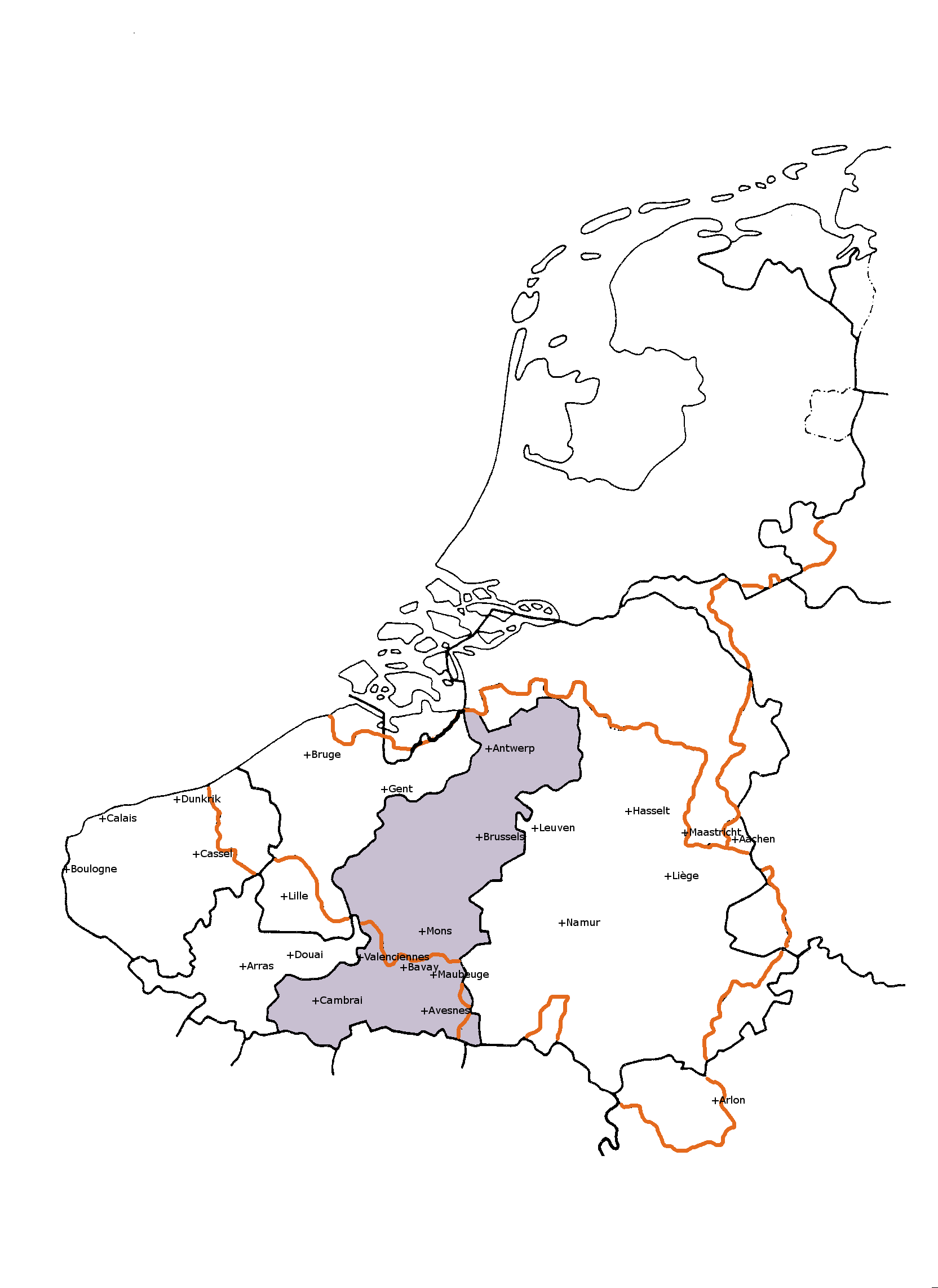
The medieval diocese of Cambrai was based upon the Roman civitas of the Nervii.

During the Roman era, the original chief city of the Nervian civitas was at Bagacum, (Gaulish: Bāgācon, from bagos 'beech'). The city was founded to the south of the traditional Nervian territory and is now known as Bavay, a town in France near the Belgian border. The forum has been excavated. The town was founded in c.30 BC and rapidly became a centre of Roman civilization. Towns belonging to the Nervian territory were Fanum Martis (Famars), and Geminiacum (Liberchies).

The Nervians were well known for the export of grain; an interesting tombstone of a frumentarius was excavated as far away as Nijmegen. They also produced ceramics (terra nigra).

Inscriptions found on artifacts recovered at Rough Castle Fort along the Antonine Wall across the Central Belt of Scotland indicate that in the second century the fort was the base for 500 men of the Sixth Cohort of Nervii, an infantry unit. According to Tacitus, the Nervians also served in cohorts based along the Rhine border. Altars found at the Roman fort of Whitley Castle in Northumberland, also known as Epiacum, bear inscriptions showing that the Second Nervians were garrisoned at the fort. Two sandstones uncovered at Bainbridge, record the Roman construction of a fort at Brough Hill in the third century. An inscription on a tablet indicated that the fort was built by the Sixth Cohort, under the charge of Gaius Valerius Pudens, a senator of consular rank.

The Notitia Dignitatum reports that the Nervii were a Gaulish tribe.

At some point probably after the disastrous attacks by the Franks in 260-275 AD, a new chief city was designated at Camaracum (Cambrai), further south than Bavay, and Bavay itself, and the main road it was on, became part of a new secondary fortified border zone. The northern part of Nervian territory, was eventually settled by Germanic groups, while the southern part, the southern part of medieval Brabant, and medieval Hainaut, remained more Romanized. By 432 it seems the Franks had penetrated into the country of the Romanized Nervians and had been taken over by the Franks. Their king Childeric I was buried in Tournai. The medieval Roman Catholic Archdiocese of Cambrai continued to cover the same approximate area as the Roman civitas until 1559.

One likely difference between the Roman and medieval boundaries is that the north-eastern part of the archdiocese, the deanery of Antwerp east of the river Rupel may have been a medieval attachment.

== In popular culture ==
The Nervii and their western neighbours the Menapii are the main subjects of the comic book Asterix in Belgium. In it, a competition between the Belgians and the Gauls from Armorica takes place to decide who was the bravest, under the unlikely adjudication of Julius Caesar.

The Nervii are featured in the video game Total War: Rome II.

== Museums ==
- Musée Archéologique de Bavay (France)
- Musée Royal de Mariemont, Morlanwelz (Belgium)
- Provinciaal Archeocentrum Velzeke (Belgium) www.pam-ov.be/velzeke

== Bibliography ==
- Busse, Peter E. (2006). "Belgae". In Koch, John T. (ed.). Celtic Culture: A Historical Encyclopedia. ABC-CLIO. pp. 195–200. ISBN 978-1-85109-440-0.
- Delamarre, Xavier (2003). Dictionnaire de la langue gauloise: Une approche linguistique du vieux-celtique continental. Errance. ISBN 9782877723695.
- Falileyev, Alexander (2010). Dictionary of Continental Celtic Place-names: A Celtic Companion to the Barrington Atlas of the Greek and Roman World. CMCS. ISBN 978-0955718236.

== See also ==
- List of Celtic tribes
