= Maurits Gysseling =

Belgian linguist

Maurits Gysseling (Oudenburg, 7 September 1919 – Ghent, 24 November 1997) was an influential Belgian researcher into historical linguistics and paleography. He was especially well known for his editions and studies of old texts relevant to the history of the Dutch language, and also for his very detailed analyses of historical place-names and their probable origins.

Based upon the results of his study of place-names, Gysseling became one of the proponents of the "Nordwestblok" idea that before the 2nd century BCE the language of Gallia Belgica was an Indo-European language that was neither Germanic nor Celtic. According to his conclusions, the northern Belgae then became Germanic-speaking, and never had been fully Celtic-speaking, in the centuries before Rome conquered them.

Major published works include:

- Diplomata Belgica ante annum millesimum centesimum scripta (2 volumes) (1950)
- Toponymisch woordenboek van België, Nederland, Luxemburg, Noord-Frankrijk en West-Duitsland (vóór 1226) (2 volumes) (1960) (A dictionary of place names in Belgium, Holland, Luxemburg, North France, and West Germany (before 1226))
- Proeve van een Oudnederlandse grammatica (1964) (Attempt at an Old Dutch grammar)
- Hoofdlijnen in de evolutie van het Nederlandse vocalensysteem (1975)
- De Germaanse woorden in de Lex Salica (1976) (Germanic words in the Lex Salica)
- Noordwesteuropese persoonsnaambestanddelen (1982) (Components of northwest European personal names)
- Prehistorische waternamen (1983) (Prehistoric water names)
- Inventaris van het archief van Sint-Baafs en Bisdom Gent tot eind 1801 (5 delen) (1997-2000) (Inventory of the archive of Sint-Baafs and the Bishopric of Ghent until the end of 1801)

At his death his letters and archives were left to the Ghent University, where he had worked, and the Koninklijke Academie voor Nederlandse Taal- en Letterkunde (Royal Academy for Dutch Language and Literature). Uncompleted works in these records include Het Antroponymisch Woordenboek van België, Nederland, Luxemburg, Noord-Frankrijk en West-Duitsland (tot 1226), the Toponymisch Woordenboek van Oost- en Zeeuws-Vlaanderen and a re-working of Julius Pokorny's Indogermanisches Etymologisches Wörterbuch.
