= Belgae =

Historical Gallic-Germanic tribal confederation

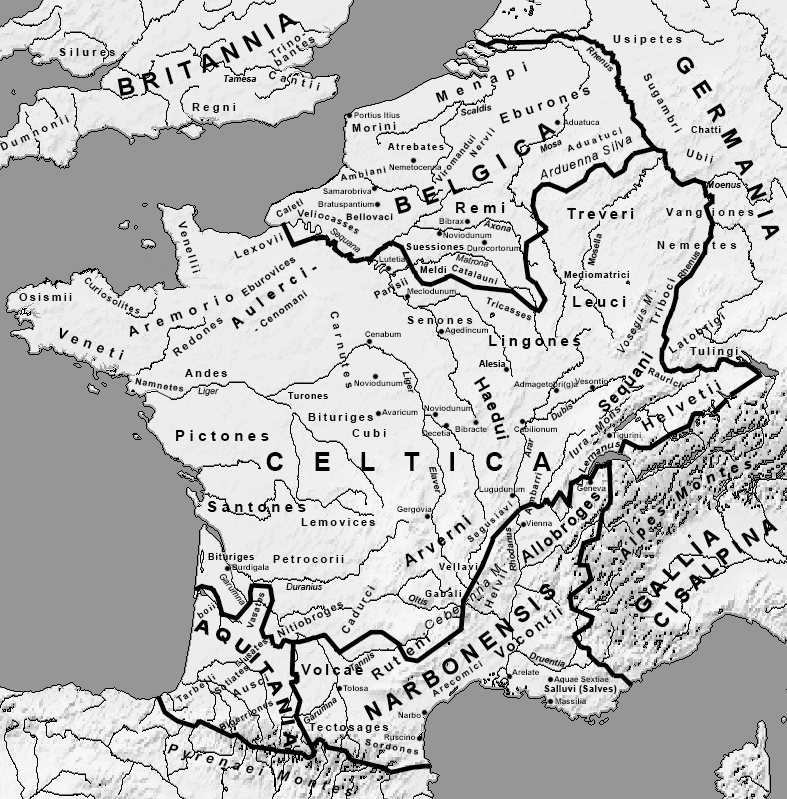
Approximate location of pre-Roman Belgic Gaul shortly before Roman conquest, according to an interpretation of Caesar

Map of northeastern Gaul around 70 AD

The Belgae (/ˈbɛldʒiː/ BELL-jee, /-ɡaɪ/ -gye) were a large confederation of tribes living in northern Gaul, between the English Channel, the west bank of the Rhine, and the northern bank of the river Seine, from at least the third century BC. They were discussed in depth by Julius Caesar in his account of his wars in Gaul. Some peoples in southern Britain were also called Belgae and had apparently moved from the continent. T. F. O'Rahilly believed that some had moved further west and he equated them with the Fir Bolg in Ireland. The Roman province of Gallia Belgica was named after the continental Belgae. The term continued to be used in the region until the present day and is reflected in the name of the modern country of Belgium.

== Etymology ==
The consensus among linguists is that the ethnic name Belgae probably comes from the Proto-Celtic root *belg- or *bolg- meaning "to swell (particularly with anger/battle fury/etc.)", cognate with the Dutch adjective gebelgd "very angry" (weak perfect participle of the verb belgen "to become angry") and verbolgen "being angry" (strong perfect participle of obsolete verbelgen "to make angry"), as well as the Old English verb belgan, "to be angry" (from Proto-Germanic *balgiz), derived ultimately from the Proto-Indo-European root *bhelgh- ("to swell, bulge, billow"). Thus, a Proto-Celtic ethnic name *Bolgoi could be interpreted as "the people who swell (particularly with anger/battle fury)".

== Origins of the Belgae ==
In Julius Caesar's Latin terminology, Belgium was a geographical region comprising territories of the Bellovaci, Ambiani, Atrebates, and Veromandui. These four communities are widely thought to have been the original Belgae in Gaul.

Caesar also defined the Belgae in a broader sense when he described them as inhabiting the northernmost of the three major divisions of Gaul at the time of his conquests (58–51 BC), along with by the Aquitani in the southwest, the Gauls in the biggest central part, who in their own language were called Celtae. Each of these three parts, he wrote, differed in terms of customs, laws and language. He noted that the Belgae, were "the bravest, because they are furthest from the civilization and refinement of [our] Province, and merchants least frequently resort to them, and import those things which tend to effeminate the mind; and they are the nearest to the Germans, who dwell beyond the Rhine, with whom they are continually waging war". Ancient sources such as Caesar are not always clear about the things used to define ethnicity today. While Caesar or his sources described the Belgae as distinctly different from the Gauls, Strabo stated that the differences between the Celts (Gauls) and Belgae in countenance, language, politics and way of life was a small one, unlike the difference between the Aquitanians and Celts. The fact that the Belgae were living in Gaul means that in one sense they were Gauls. This may be Caesar's meaning when he says "The Belgae have the same method of attacking a fortress as the rest of the Gauls".

Inconsistently, Caesar in Bello Gallico, II.4 also contrasted them with Gauls:

When Caesar inquired of them what states were in arms, how powerful they were, and what they could do, in war, he received the following information: that the greater part of the Belgae were sprung, from the Germans, and that having crossed the Rhine at an early period, they had settled there, on account of the fertility of the country, and had driven out the Gauls who inhabited those regions; and that they were the only people who, in the memory of our fathers [i.e. as far as we can remember], when all Gaul was overrun, had prevented the Teutones and the Cimbri from entering their territories; the effect of which was, that, from the recollection of those events, they assumed to themselves great authority and haughtiness in military matters.

So Caesar used the word "Germani" in two ways. He described a group of tribes within the Belgic alliance as the "Germani", distinguishing them from their neighbours. The most important of these tribes in relation to Caesar's campaigns were the Eburones. The other way he used the term was to refer to those related tribes east of the Rhine, who were not Celtic. So the Germani among the Belgae are called, based on Caesar's account, the Germani cisrhenani, to distinguish them from other Germani living east of the Rhine in what he understood to be their homeland. However, the later historian Tacitus was informed that the name Germania was known to have changed in meaning:

The first people to cross the Rhine and oust the Gauls, those now called Tungri, were then called Germani. It was the name of this nation, not a race, that gradually came into general use. And so, to begin with, they were all called Germani after the conquerors because of the terror these inspired, and then, once the name had been devised, they adopted it themselves.

In other words, Tacitus understood that the collective name Germani had first been used in Gaul, for a specific people there with connections beyond the Rhine, the Tungri being the name of the people living where the Eburones had lived in later imperial times, and was later adopted as a collective name for the non-Celtic peoples beyond the Rhine, the other, better-known way that Caesar used the term.

== Culture ==
The cultural cohesion of Belgium as Caesar sketched it is suggested by the maintaining of these borders, more or less, in administrative divisions (pagi) mapped out later by the Romans and still evident in the parishes of the Carolingian era. Archaeology suggests cultural continuities from the third to the first centuries BC within this subregion, inhabited in the time of Caesar by Bellovaci, Ambiani, Atrebates, and Veromandui.

From 250 BC onward, the disposal of the dead was primarily through cremation, with some inhumation practiced. Ceramics and brooches are typical grave goods, while items of feasting appear in wealthier graves. The absence of weapons distinguishes these burials from the funerary practice of communities to the north and south.

Around this same time, a characteristic form of enclosed sanctuary began to be built, and from the late 2nd through the mid 1st centuries BC, fortifications with a high earthen rampart and a wide, flat-bottomed ditch are concentrated there.

The coinage of the Belgae in Gaul shows commonalities in design and distribution patterns from the 4th to the 1st centuries BC.

The Belgae of this period do not appear to have drunk beer.

== Language ==
Caesar's book Commentarii de Bello Gallico begins: "All Gaul is divided into three parts, one of which the Belgae inhabit, the Aquitani another, those who in their own language are called Celts, in ours Gauls, the third. All these differ from each other in language, customs and laws." However, many modern scholars believe that the Belgae were a Celtic-speaking group. On the other hand, at least part of the Belgae may also have had significant cultural and historical connections to peoples east of the Rhine, including Germanic peoples, judging from archaeological, placename and textual evidence. It has also been argued based on placename studies that the older language of the area, though apparently Indo-European, was not Celtic (see Nordwestblock) and that Celtic, though influential amongst the elite, might never have been the main language of the part of the Belgic area north of the Ardennes. For example, Maurits Gysseling suggested that prior to Celtic and Germanic influences the Belgae may have comprised a distinct Indo-European branch, termed Belgian.

However, most of the Belgic tribal and personal names recorded are identifiably Gaulish, including those of the Germani cisrhenani, and this is indeed also true of the tribes immediately over the Rhine at this time, such as the Tencteri and Usipetes. Surviving inscriptions also indicate that Gaulish was spoken in at least part of Belgic territory.

The Romans were not precise in their ethnography of northern barbarians: by "Germanic", Caesar may simply have meant "originating east of the Rhine" (the homeland of the Germani cisrhenani) with no distinction of language intended. The east of the Rhine was not necessarily inhabited by Germanic speakers at this time. It has been remarked that Germanic speakers might have been no closer than the river Elbe in the time of Caesar. However, studies of place names, such as those of Maurits Gysseling, have been argued to show evidence of the pre-Roman presence of early Germanic languages throughout the Belgic area north of the Ardennes, where the Germani cisrhenani lived. The sound changes described by "Grimm's law" appear to have affected names with older forms, apparently already in the second century BC. Strong evidence for old Celtic placenames, though, is found in the Ardennes and to the south of them. According to Strabo, the country of the Belgae extended along the coast where 15 tribes were living from the Rhenus (Rhine) to the Liger (Loire). Strabo also says that "Augustus Caesar, when dividing the country into four parts, united the Keltae to the Narbonnaise; the Aquitani he preserved the same as Julius Caesar, but added thereto fourteen other nations of those who dwelt between the Garonne and the river Loire, and dividing the rest into two parts, the one extending to the upper districts of the Rhine (Gallia Lugdunensis) he made dependent upon Lugdunum, the other [he assigned] to the Belgae (Gallia Belgica)."

Apart from the Germani, the report of Caesar seems to indicate that more of the Belgae had some Germanic ethnicity, but this is not necessarily what defines a tribe as Belgic. Edith Wightman proposed that Caesar can be read as treating only the southwestern Belgic tribes, the Suessiones, Viromandui and Ambiani and perhaps some of their neighbours, as the true ethnic Belgae, as opposed to those in a political and military alliance with them. She reads Caesar as implying a "transition zone" of mixed ethnicity and ancestry for the Menapii, Nervii and Morini, all living in the northwest of the Belgic region, neighbours to the Germani cisrhenani in the northeast. (Caesar also mentions his allies the Remi being closest to the Celts amongst the Belgae.)

It seems that, whatever their ancestry, at least some of the Belgic tribes spoke a variety of Gaulish as their main language by Caesar's time, and all of them used such languages in at least some contexts. Luc van Durme summarizes competing evidence of Celtic and Germanic influence at the time of Caesar by saying that "one has to accept the rather remarkable conclusion that Caesar must have witnessed a situation opposing Celtic and Germanic in Belgium, in a territory slightly more to the south than the early medieval Romance-Germanic language border", but van Durme accepts that Germanic did not block "Celticisation coming from the south" so "both phenomena were simultaneous and interfering".

The medieval Gesta Treverorum compiled by monks of Trier claims that the Belgae were descendants of Trebeta, an otherwise unattested legendary founder of Trier, the Roman Augusta Treverorum, "Augusta of the Treveri".

== Tribes of the Belgae ==
Caesar names the following as Belgic tribes, which can be related to later Roman provinces:

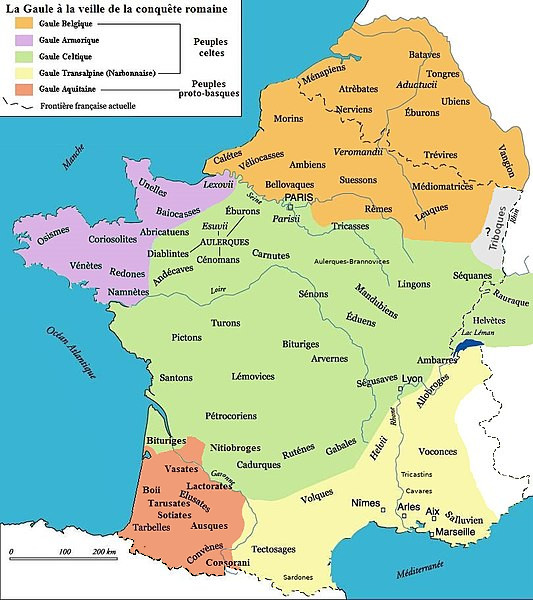
According to Strabo: the Belgian tribes (in orange), including the Armoricani (in purple)

Belgae of Caesar's "Belgium" Integrated into Roman Belgica II	Belgae also integrated into Roman Belgica II Sometimes described by Caesar as if not in "Belgium"	Germani Cisrhenani, also sometimes Belgae in Caesar Integrated into Germania Inferior	Southeast: not called Belgae by Caesar Integrated into Roman Belgica I
Ambiani; Atrebates; Bellovaci; Suessiones; Viromandui; Southwest: possibly not in "Belgium": Caleti; Veliocassi	Northwest and considered remote by Romans: Menapii; Morini; Nervii; South, not in alliance against Rome: Remi	Caesar sometimes calls them Belgae, sometimes contrasts them with Belgae.: Caerosi; Condrusi; Eburones; Paemani; Segni; Descendants of the Cimbri, living near Germani Cisrhenani: Atuatuci	Possibly Belgae, later within Belgica I: Treveri; Leuci; Mediomatrici; Not Belgae, later in Germania Superior (still later Germania I): Lingones; Sequani; Rauricii; Helvetii

Later, Tacitus mentioned a tribe called the Tungri living where the Germani cisrhenani had lived, and he also stated that they had once been called the Germani (although Caesar had claimed to have wiped out the name of the main tribe, the Eburones). Other tribes that may have been included among the Belgae in some contexts were the Leuci, Treveri and Mediomatrici. Posidonius includes the Armoricani, as well.

== Conquest of the Belgae ==
Caesar conquered the Belgae, beginning in 57 BC. He writes that the Belgae were conspiring and arming themselves in response to his earlier conquests; to counter this threat, he raised two new legions and ordered his Gallic allies, the Aedui, to invade the territory of the Bellovaci, the largest and fiercest of the Belgae tribes. Wary of the numbers and bravery of the Belgae, Caesar initially avoided a pitched battle, resorting mainly to cavalry skirmishes to probe their strengths and weaknesses. Once he was satisfied his troops were a match for them, he made camp on a low hill protected by a marsh at the front and the river Aisne behind, near Bibrax (between modern Laon and Reims) in the territory of the Remi.

The Belgae attacked over the river, but were repulsed after a fierce battle. Realising they could not dislodge the Romans and aware of the approach of the Aedui into the lands of the Bellovaci, the Belgae decided to disband their combined force and return to their own lands. Caesar's informants advised him that whichever tribe Caesar attacked first, the others would come to their defence. They broke camp shortly before midnight. At daybreak, satisfied the retreat was not a trap, Caesar sent cavalry to harass the rear guard, followed by three legions. Many of the Belgae were killed in battle.

Caesar next marched into the territory of the Suessiones and besieged the town of Noviodunum (Soissons). Seeing the Romans' siege engines, the Suessiones surrendered, whereupon Caesar turned his attention to the Bellovaci, who had retreated into the fortress of Bratuspantium (between modern Amiens and Beauvais). They quickly surrendered, as did the Ambiani.

The Nervii, along with the Atrebates and Viromandui, decided to fight (the Atuatuci had also agreed to join them, but had not yet arrived). They concealed themselves in the forests and attacked the approaching Roman column at the river Sabis (previously thought to be the Sambre, but recently the Selle is thought to be more probable). Their attack was quick and unexpected. The element of surprise briefly left the Romans exposed. Some of the Romans did not have time to take the covers off their shields or to even put on their helmets. However, Caesar grabbed a shield, made his way to the front line, and quickly organised his forces. The two Roman legions guarding the baggage train at the rear finally arrived and helped to turn the tide of the battle. Caesar says the Nervii were almost annihilated in the battle, and is effusive in his tribute to their bravery, calling them "heroes" (for more details see Battle of the Sabis).

The Atuatuci, who were marching to their aid, turned back on hearing of the defeat and retreated to one stronghold, were put under siege, and soon surrendered and handed over their arms. However, the surrender was a ploy, and the Atuatuci, armed with weapons they had hidden, tried to break out during the night. The Romans had the advantage of position and killed 4,000. The rest, about 53,000, were sold into slavery.

In 53 BC, the Eburones, led by Ambiorix, along with the Nervii, Menapii and Morini, revolted again and wiped out fifteen cohorts, only to be put down by Caesar. The Belgae fought in the uprising of Vercingetorix in 52 BC.

After their final subjugation, Caesar combined the three parts of Gaul, the territory of the Belgae, Celtae and Aquitani, into a single unwieldy province (Gallia Comata, "long-haired Gaul") that was reorganized by the emperor Augustus into its traditional cultural divisions. The province of Gallia Belgica was bounded on its east by the Rhine and extended all the way from the North Sea to Lake Constance (Lacus Brigantinus), including parts of what is now western Switzerland, with its capital at the city of the Remi (Reims). Under Diocletian, Belgica Prima (capital Augusta Trevirorum, Trier) and Belgica Secunda (capital Reims) formed part of the diocese of Gaul.

== Belgae outside Gaul ==
Belgae in Great Britain
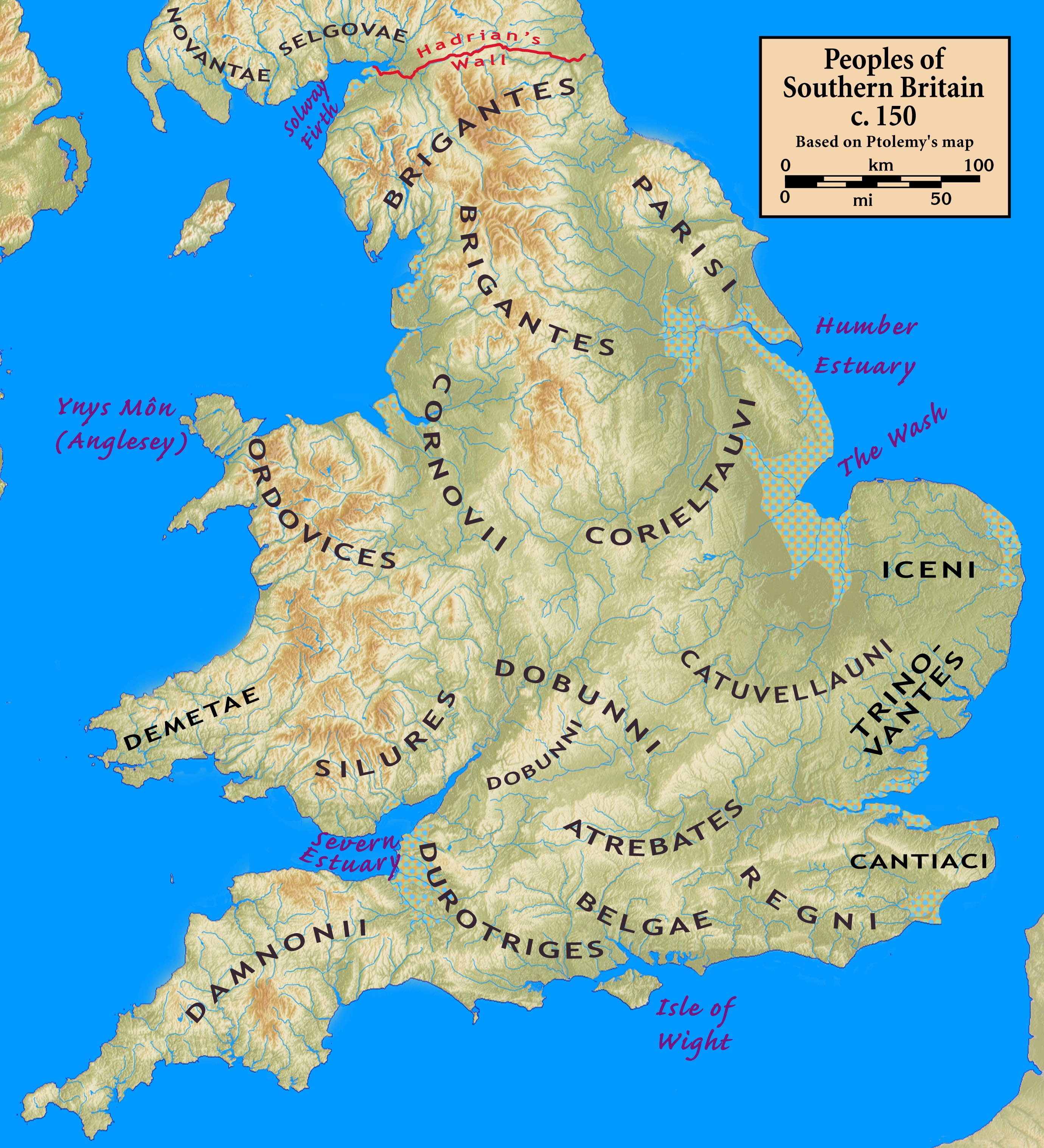

Geography
- Capital: Venta Belgarum (Winchester)
- Location: Southern Britain
- Rulers: Diviciacus(?)

=== Great Britain ===
The Belgae had made their way across the English Channel into southern Britain in Caesar's time. Caesar asserts they had first crossed the channel as raiders, only later establishing themselves on the island. The precise extent of their conquests is unknown. After the Roman conquest of Great Britain, the civitas of the Belgae was bordered to the north by the British Atrebates, who were also a Belgic tribe, and to the east by the Regni, who were probably linked to the Belgae as well. The arrival and spread of Aylesford-Swarling pottery across the southeastern corner of Britain has been related to the Belgic invasion since Arthur Evans published his excavation of Aylesford in 1890, which was then thought to show "the demonstrable reality of a Belgic invasion", according to Sir Barry Cunliffe, although more recent studies tend to downplay the role of migration in favour of increasing trade links; the question remains unclear.

A large number of coins of the Ambiani dating to the mid-second century BC have been found in southern Britain and the remains of a possible Belgic fort have been unearthed in Kent. Within memory of Caesar's time, a king of the Suessiones (also referred to as Suaeuconi) called Diviciacus was not only the most powerful king of Belgic Gaul, but also ruled territory in Britain. Commius of the Atrebates, Caesar's former ally, fled to Britain after participating in Vercingetorix's rebellion and either joined or established a British branch of his tribe. Based on the development of imagery on coins, by the time of the Roman conquest, some of the tribes of south-eastern Britain likely were ruled by a Belgic nobility and were culturally influenced by them. The later civitas (administrative division) of Roman Britain had towns including Portus Adurni (Portchester) and Clausentum (Southampton). The civitas capital was at Venta Belgarum (Winchester), which was built on top of an Iron Age oppidum (this was itself built on the site of two earlier abandoned hillforts); Winchester remains Hampshire's county town to this day. In addition to Venta Belgarum, the ancient geographer Ptolemy lists Aquae Calidae (Bath) and Iscalis as poleis of the Belgae.

=== Ireland ===
In his theory of Ireland's prehistory, T. F. O'Rahilly suggested in 1946 that a branch of the Belgae settled in Ireland around the 5th century BC, later becoming the historical Iverni (Érainn) and their offshoots. He believes the memory of Belgae settlers was preserved in medieval Irish legend as the Fir Bolg. O'Rahilly's theory has been challenged by historians and archaeologists, and is no longer accepted.

Fintan O'Toole suggested the Keshcarrigan Bowl is evidence for the movement of people into Ireland following upheaval and displacement, triggered by the Belgae arriving into Britain as refugees.

== See also ==
- Parisii
- Nordwestblock
- Frisii
- Isogloss
- Builg
- Belgic foot
