= Viromandui =

Belgic tribe

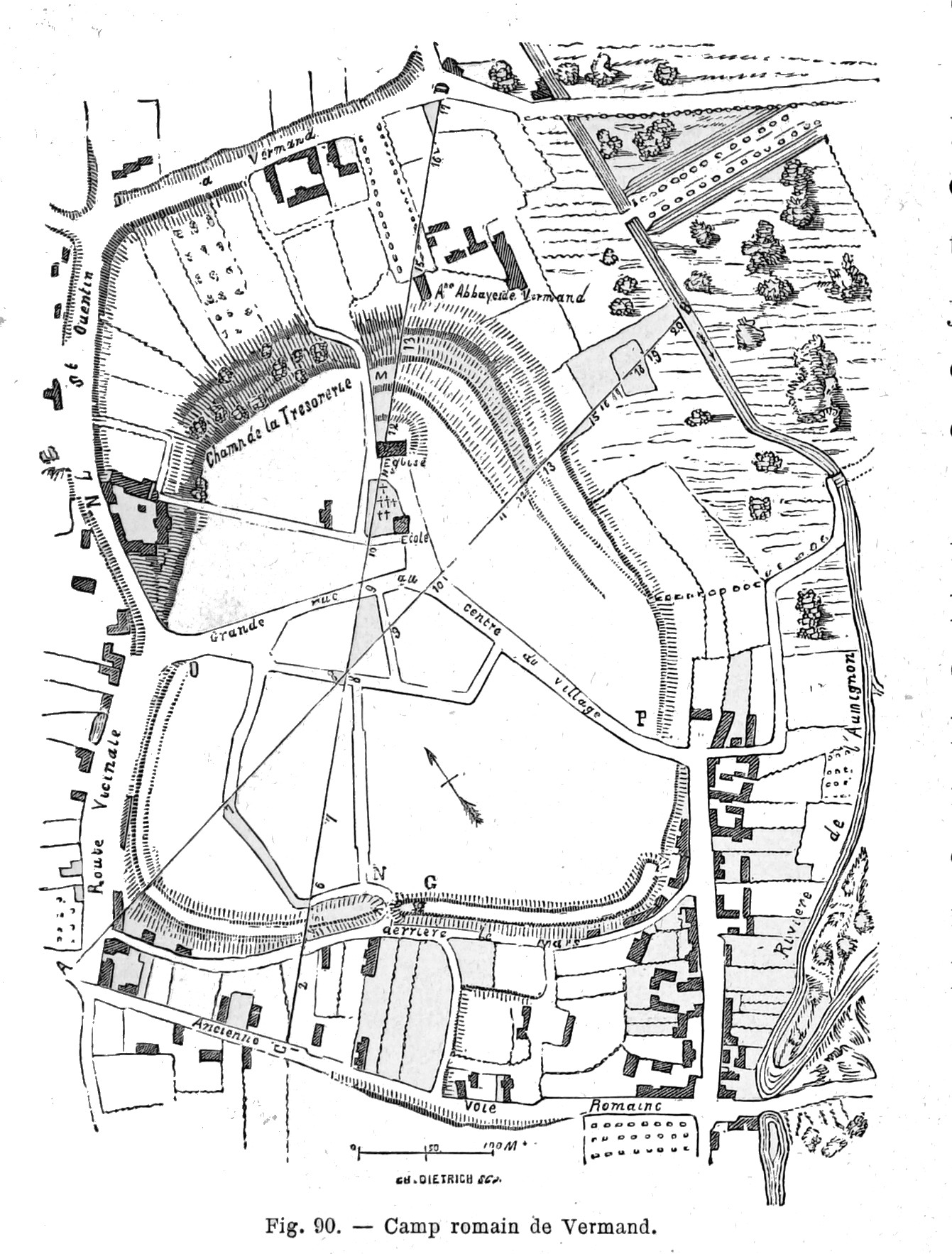
Plan of the oppidum of the Viromandui at Vermand by Édouard Fleury (1877)

The Viromanduī or Veromanduī (Gaulish: *Uiromanduoi) were a Belgic tribe dwelling in the historic Vermandois region (Picardy) during the Iron Age and Roman periods. During the Gallic Wars (58–50 BC), they belonged to the Belgic coalition of 57 BC against Caesar.

== Name ==
They are mentioned as Viromanduos and Viromanduis (var. vero-) by Caesar (mid-1st c. BC), Viromanduos by Livy (late 1st c. BC), Veromandui (var. uir-) by Pliny (1st c. AD), (Ou̓i)romándues (<Οὐι>ῥομάνδυες) by Ptolemy (2nd c. AD), and as Veromandi by Orosius (early 5th c. AD).

The ethnonym Viromanduī is a latinized form of Gaulish *Uiromanduoi (sing. Uiromanduos), which literally means 'horse-men' or 'male ponies'. It derives from the stem *uiro- ('man') attached to mandos ('pony'). It should perhaps be interpreted as the 'Centaurs' or as the '[men] virile in owning ponies'. Pierre-Yves Lambert has also proposed the meaning 'those who trample upon men', by comparing the second element with the Welsh mathru.

The city of Vermand, probably attested as Virmandensium castrum in the 9th c. AD (Virmandi in 1160), and the region of Vermandois, attested in 877 as Vermandensis pagus ('pagus of the Viromandui'), are named after the Belgic tribe. A civitas Veromandorum is mentioned in the Notita Galliarum (ca. 400 AD); whether it refers to Vermand or to Saint-Quentin is debated.

== Geography ==
=== Territory ===
The civitas of the Viromandui during the Roman period.

The territory of the Viromandui corresponded for the most part to the limits of the Diocese of Vermandois, around the modern towns of Vermand, Saint-Quentin, Noyon and Moislains. It was located on the 'sill of Vermandois', in an area partly surrounded by dense forests on the upper courses of the Somme and Oise rivers.

They dwelled between the Ambiani and Bellovaci in the west, the Nervii and Atrebates in the north, the Remi in the east, and the Suessiones in the south. The Oise river is traditionally regarded as the eastern border between the Viromandui and Remi. Ernest Desjardins, followed by some authors, has proposed that the Viromanduan territory stretched further east as far as Vervins, although this remains controversial.

=== Settlements ===
==== Pre-Roman period ====
Their main oppidum (16–20 hectares) until the Roman period, corresponding to the modern town of Vermand, was situated on a promontory east of the Omignon river. Fortifications and continuous occupation emerged relatively late on the site, just before or during the Gallic Wars (58–50 BC), and it probably served only as a temporary refuge until the Roman invasion of Belgica. Some have also proposed that it was erected as a military camp by Belgic auxiliaries serving in the Roman army. The site remained densely occupied from the Augustan era until the beginning of the 5th century AD.

==== Roman period ====
Augusta Viromandorum (modern Saint-Quentin), founded closer to communication axis just 11 km away from the oppidum of Vermand during the reign of Augustus (27 BC–14 AD), soon replaced Vermand as the main settlement. During the Roman period, Augusta Viromandorum reached a size of 40–60ha, in the average of Gallo-Roman chief towns. During the 4th century, the settlement was apparently deserted or at least saw its population considerably reduced. Some scholars have argued that Augusta (Saint-Quentin) was replaced by Virmandis (Vermand) as the chief town of the civitas during this period, and that it eventually regained its position in the 9th century, although this has been doubted by other scholars.

Noviomagus (Gaulish: 'new market'), corresponding to modern Noyon, is first mentioned in the Antonine Itinerary (late 3rd c. AD) as a station on the route between Amiens and Reims. By the 6th century, the influence of the town could rival other settlements of the region, and it became a local religious centre of power after the bishop Medardus transferred his episcopal siege to Noyon in 531.

Other secondary agglomerations were located at Gouy, Contraginum (Condren), Châtillon-sur-Oise, and possibly at Marcy. Gouy was occupied from the 1st century AD until at least the 3rd century. Located in the vicinity of Saint-Quentin, it reached a size of 12ha at its height.

== History ==
=== La Tène period ===
According to archaeologist Jean-Louis Brunaux, large-scale migrations occurred in the northern part of Gaul in the late 4th–early 3rd century BC, which may correspond to the coming of the Belgae. By the end of the 3rd century BC, the Viromandui were probably already culturally integrated to the Belgae.

=== Gallic Wars ===
The Viromandui are perhaps most famous for being a part of a Belgic alliance against the expansion of Julius Caesar. Alongside the Nervii and the Atrebates, they fought against Julius Caesar in the Battle of the Sabis, around 57 BC, named for the river that split the battlefield. We know about this battle because it is described extensively in Julius Caesar’s De Bello Gallico. He tells how the Belgae surprised the Romans by charging out of the woods while the legions were still constructing the Roman camp. In the initial part of the battle, the Romans lost their camp and took heavy losses, prompting their Gallic allies to desert them. However, they reformed their lines and were finally able to rout the Viromandui and Atrebates, wiping out the Nervii, who reportedly “fought to the last, fighting on top of the corpses of their brethren.” After this battle Caesar went on to destroy all the strongholds of all the Belgic tribes, breaking their power and making them part of the Roman Empire.

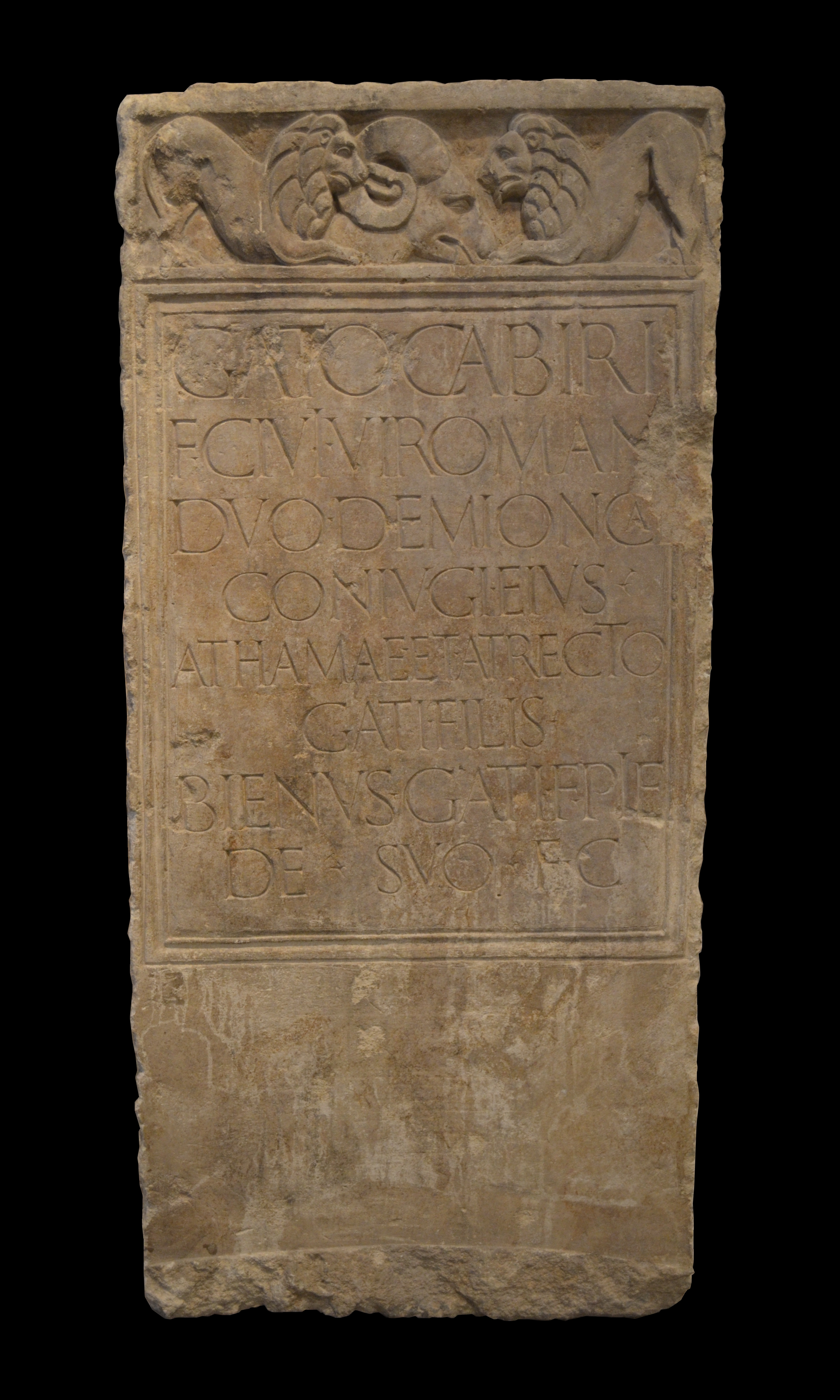
Stele erected by Bienus in honour of his father, the Viromandian Gatus, his mother and his two brothers. (CIL XIII 8342)

The Viromandui and Nervi used cavalry in very small numbers, concentrating on infantry whenever possible. Defensively, they often defeated their enemies' cavalry by forming defensive "hedges", described by Caesar as impenetrable walls of sharpened branches and skillfully cut saplings wrapped in thorns. Using these tactics they resisted the Romans by striking from the safety of their dense forests and marshes.

=== Roman period ===
The Viromandui probably gained the status of civitas during the 1st century AD. Roman-era inscriptions mention two Viromanduan serving as magistrates.

== Religion ==
The Gallo-Roman religious site of the Champ des Noyers (Marteville, 1 km from Vermand) was probably erected on an older Gallic sanctuary, where some weapons of the La Tène period, including a voluntary-deformed sword, seem to have been involved in a tradition of religious offerings. Three temples (fana) were built during the Roman period at this site.

From the beginning of the 1st century AD, a sanctuary was located in Mesnil-Saint-Nicaise which initially centred on a cremation platform used for the sacrifice of caprinae. A temple was erected on the site ca. 150 AD, then abandoned ca. 280–290 AD. A vase dedicated to Apollo Vatumarus and deposed with an offering was found at the site, along with the statuette of a mother-goddess, depictions of Risus, and effigies of the Nymphs and Sol. The divine name Vatumaros ('High Seer') is composed of the Gaulish root vātis ('soothsayer, seer') attached to maros ('high').

An inscription from Augusta Viromandorum mentions Suiccius, a Viromanduan priest honouring the Imperial numen, and attests the presence of a public cult to the god Vulcan. In the town of Condren was found a bas-relief made of stone and depicting Mercury and Rosmerta.

== Inscriptions ==
The Viromandui or their capital Augusta are also mentioned on following inscriptions:

- Viromanduo = Corpus Inscriptionum Latinarum XIII, 1465 (Clermont-Ferrand)
- civi Viromanduo = CIL XIII, 8409, 8341 et 8342 (Koln, I c.)
- Viromand(uo) = CIL XIII, 1688 (Lyon, autel des Gaules)
- Civit (ati) Vi(romanduorum) = CIL XIII, 3528 (Saint-Quentin, end of II or III c.)
- Avg(vstae) Viromandvorv(orum) = CIL VI, 32550 = 2822 et 32551 = 2821 (Rome, middle of III c.)
