= Félix Fournery =

French painter

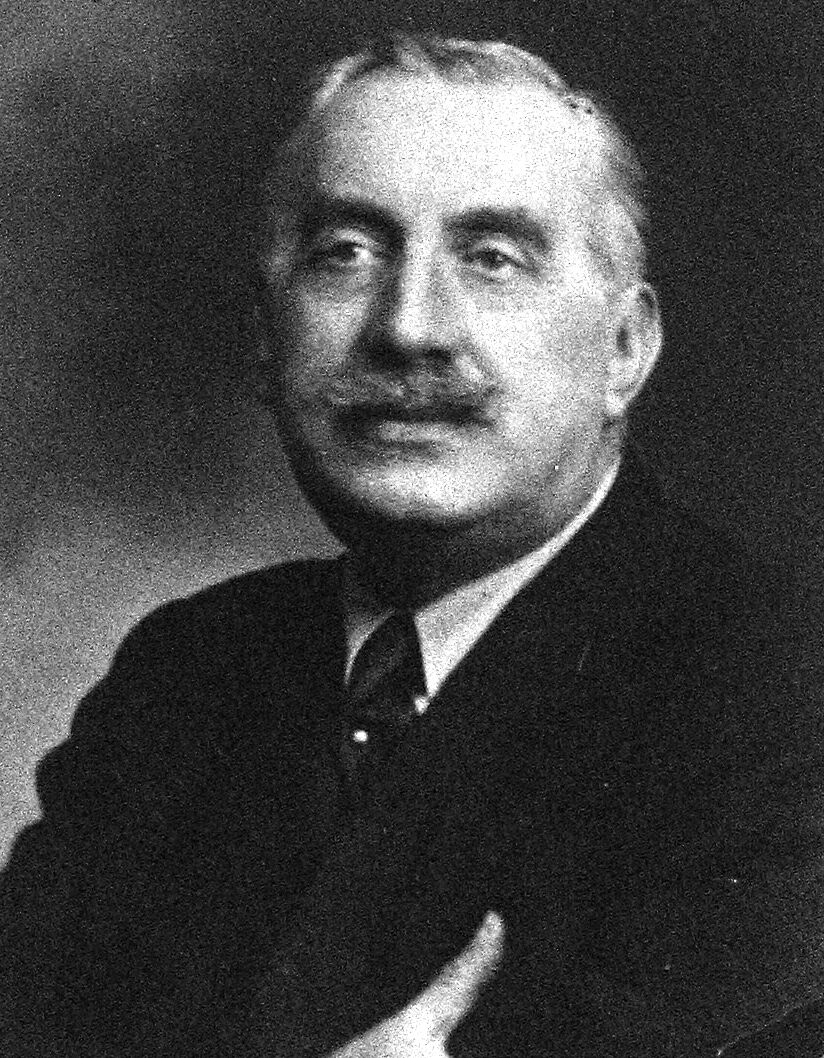
- Presumed portrait of Félix Fournery, anonymous unsourced photograph.
- Born: 13 May 1865; Paris, France
- Died: 2 February 1938 (aged 72); Montagnac-la-Crempse
- Education: École nationale supérieure des Beaux-Arts
- Known for: Painting, Fashion illustration, printmaking
- Movement: Post-Impressionism, symbolism, Art Deco
- Awards: Legion of Honour, Ordre des Palmes académiques, Order of the Crown of Italy, Order of the Crown (Romania), Medal of French Gratitude

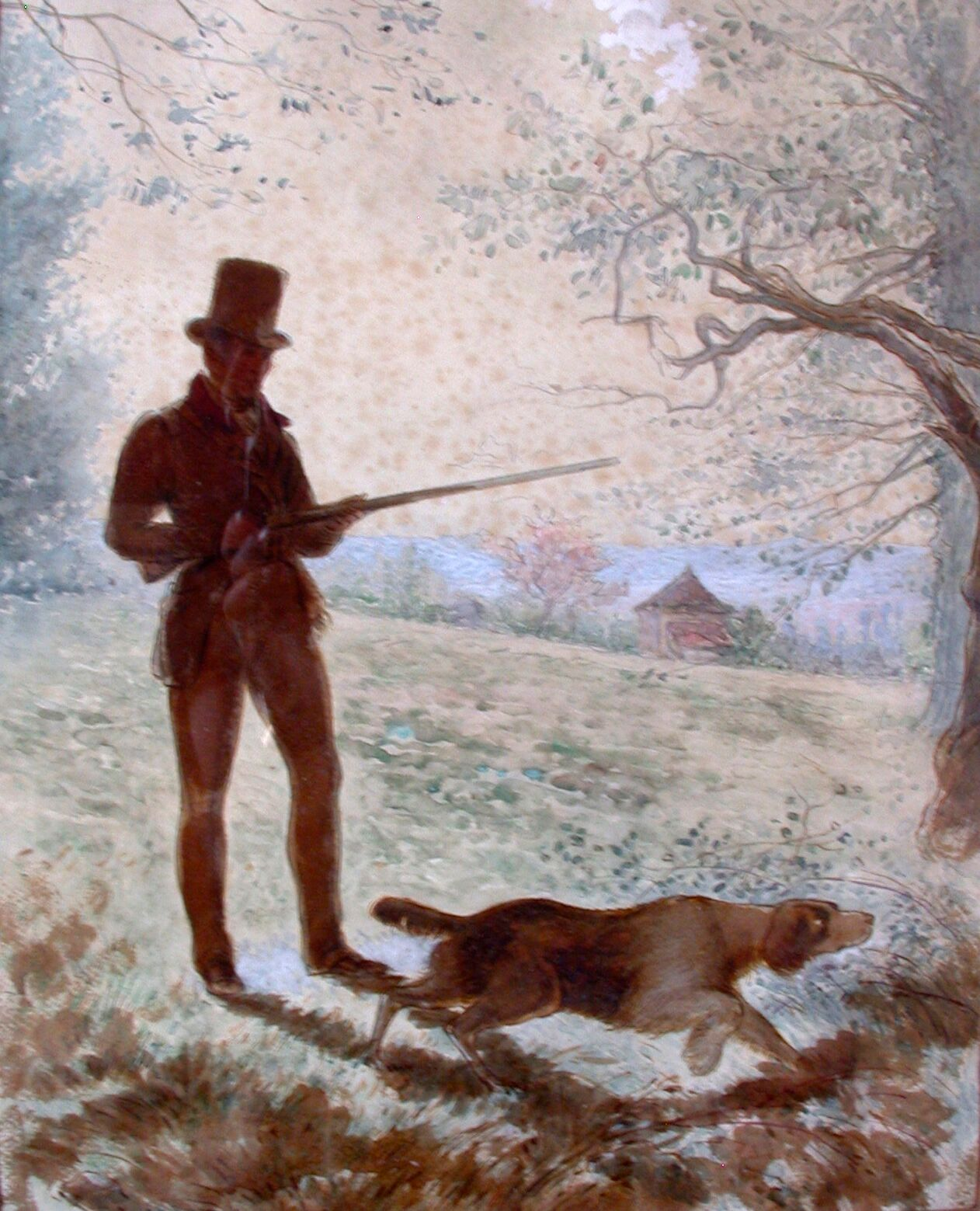
Chasse dans le Périgor, attributed to Félix Fournery.

Felix Fournery (13 May 1865 – 2 February 1938) was a French painter, fashion illustrator, printmaker, watercolourist and socialite.

A recognized artist in his days, he notably marked the collections of the Belle Epoque and the Interwar period, as he embodied the latest pictorial evolutions of the Post-Impressionism and symbolist styles.

== Early life ==
Félix Fournery was born of Louise Marie Davin, the only daughter of a writer, Félix Davin, whom, like his wife, died extremely young. His mother was then raised in a nunnery, which she left only to be married to Edmond Fournery. Felix had a brother, George, who became General of the French Army.

During the Franco-Prussian War, Fournery and his family took refuge in Villerville, where his mother had a small fisherman's house. His childhood was scarred by these round trips Paris-Villerville.

== Training, career and other ventures ==
Félix Fournery studied in the École nationale supérieure des Beaux-Arts at the age of 18, while joining Jules Lefebvre's workshop. In 1887, he became a member of the Société des Artistes Français.

From 1877 to 1920, his career as a painter was launched through several exhibitions. His works of the period are particularly inspired by Paris and Normandy, Villerville especially, where he owned a fisherman's house, thanks to his mother. The Normandy coast is at the heart of his work. After a cruise to Spitsbergen and Norway in 1905 aboard the Ile-de-France, a liner leaving from Le Havre of the Compagnie Générale Transatlantique, of which he illustrated the souvenir-catalog, he made two exhibitions in 1906, named Études et Impressions: one in the Monté Carlo Palace of Fine Arts (now demolished), and one at the Grand Palais. The works he brought back from this trip to the Far North were then very noticed. This period is marked by an approach both symbolist and Post-Impressionist. Fournery also sailed across the French coast for his works, thanks to his boat, La Jeanette, to the island of Noirmoutier for example. In 1914, appointed as the manager of the Val de Grâce complementary hospital, Villa Molière, in the 16th arrondissement of Paris, in the Villa Montmorency, he moved there with his workshop.

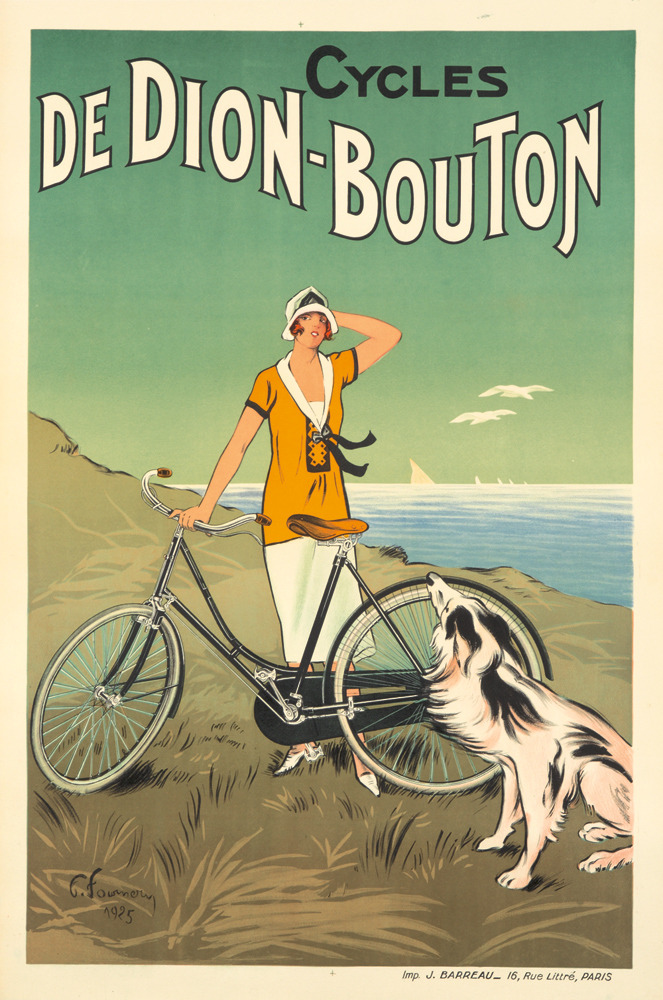
Cycles De Dion-Bouton (1925), poster by Félix Fournery.

During the same period, he became a fashion illustrator, marking with his brush and his pen the collections of the Belle Epoque. Subtle drawer of women, this part of his work brings him close to Helleu, by his subjects, and his ways. He also drew costumes and stage sets. Thus he became the Artistic Director of the Revue des Élégances Féminines de Buenos-Aires à Paris. He then led with his wife Cécile, thanks to her talent as a formidable singer, a rich and active social life all along the Interwar period. Thus, he created solid friendships among intellectuals, such as Paul Bourget, Henry Duvernois, Miguel Zamacois or Eugene Brieux.

In a completely different genre, Félix Fournery is a founding member and installer of the Car Museum of Compiègne. He notably reconstructed the salle d'auberge, from the 1800s.

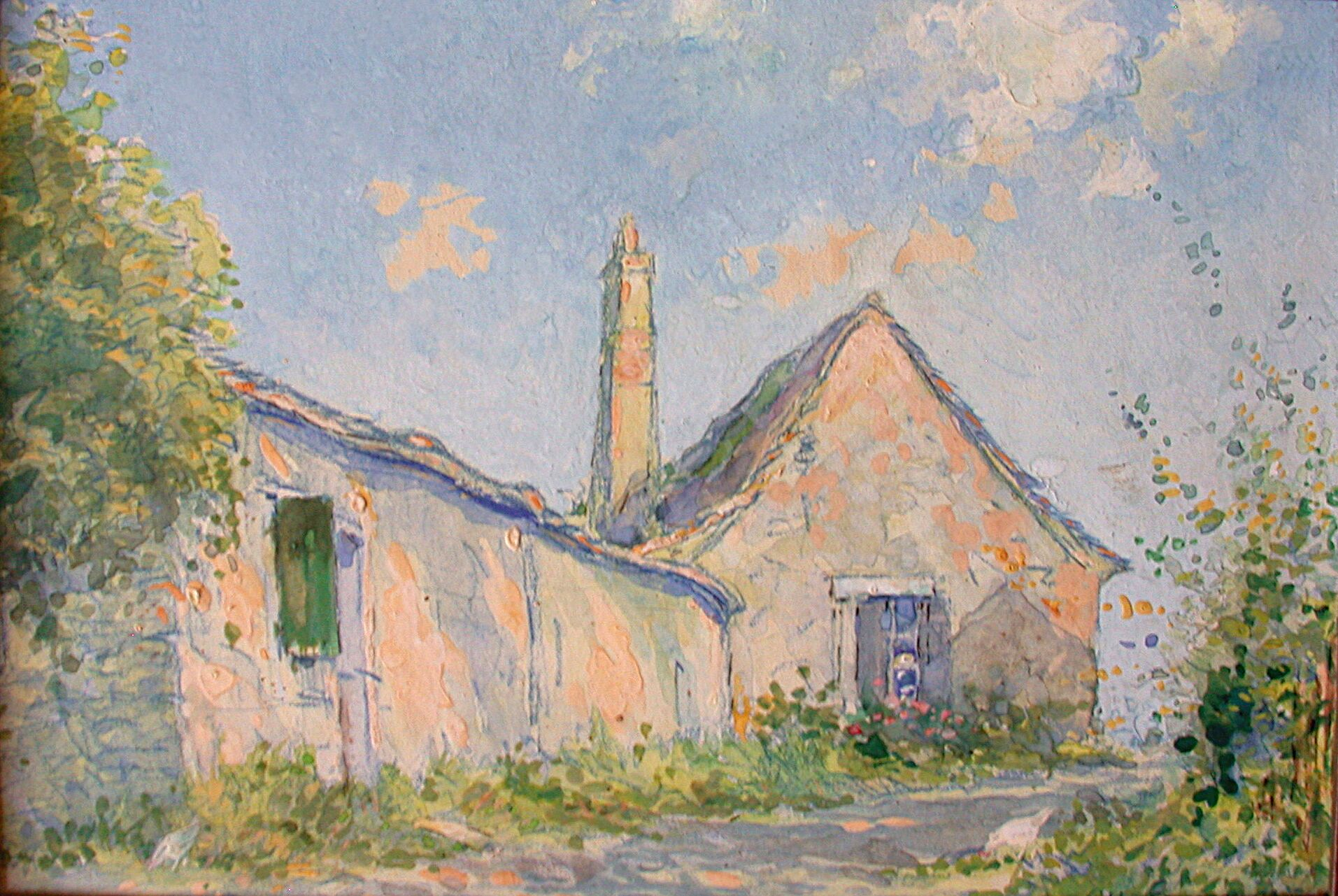
La Cleyde, Périgord, attributed to Félix Fournery.

In 1934, he retired to the Périgord near his beloved daughter, in the domain of his son-in-law, Les Pâques, in Montagnac-la-Crempse. Seduced by the skies and colors of the region, he chose to install his workshop in it, renovating for that La Cleyde, an old farmhouse of the surroundings. He could only enjoy for little, diying in 1938.

== Personal life ==
First married to Jeanne Decle. The couple had three children: Jean Fournery, Marie-Antoinette Fournery and Marie-Thérèse Fournery, who married the Earl Charles des Salles, owner of Les Pâques. His wife died aged thirty-two.

A few years later, Fournery married again. He wed Cécile Coquard, daughter of the composer Arthur Coquard. Fournery and his second wife moved to Noirmoutier. Fournery's second marriage produced three children: Anne Fournery, Catherine Fournery and Monique Fournery. The marriage ends in divorce in the 1920s, leading Fournery, broken, to leave the Villa Montmorency for the Périgord.

== Legacy ==
In 1993, the Earl Pierre des Salles, a descendant of Félix Fournery, organized an exhibition at the Town Hall of the 16th Arrondissement of Paris to revive the memory of his grandfather. Pursuing this objective, in 2016, another descendant of Fournery, Caroline Riggs-Delagrange, organized with the support of the Honfleur Town Hall an exhibition at the Greniers à Sel de Honfleur titled Félix Fournery.

Also, Fournery's work continues to stand strong on the art market.

== Fournery and literature ==
Félix Fournery is quoted, not without irony, in Colette's Retreat from Love:

« Je bus à Marthe Payet et à son mari, lui toujours premier-à-lasoie, elle éclatante et rousse, les cheveux en ondes larges sous un chapeau agressif, l’air d’un Helleu copié par Fournery… », et encore « Marthe vient vers nous. De loin, c’est toujours un Helleu. De près, la collaboration d’un Fournery inférieur s’accuse… »

In addition, Fournery illustrated a book by Louis Germont, Loges d'artistes (1889).

== Awards and honours ==
Fournery was a made a knight of Legion of Honour, of the Order of the Crown of Romania, of the Order of the Crown of Italy. He also received the Ordre des Palmes académiques and the Medal of French Gratitude.
