= Sapho (Massenet) =

Opera by Jules Massenet

- pièce lyrique by Jules Massenet
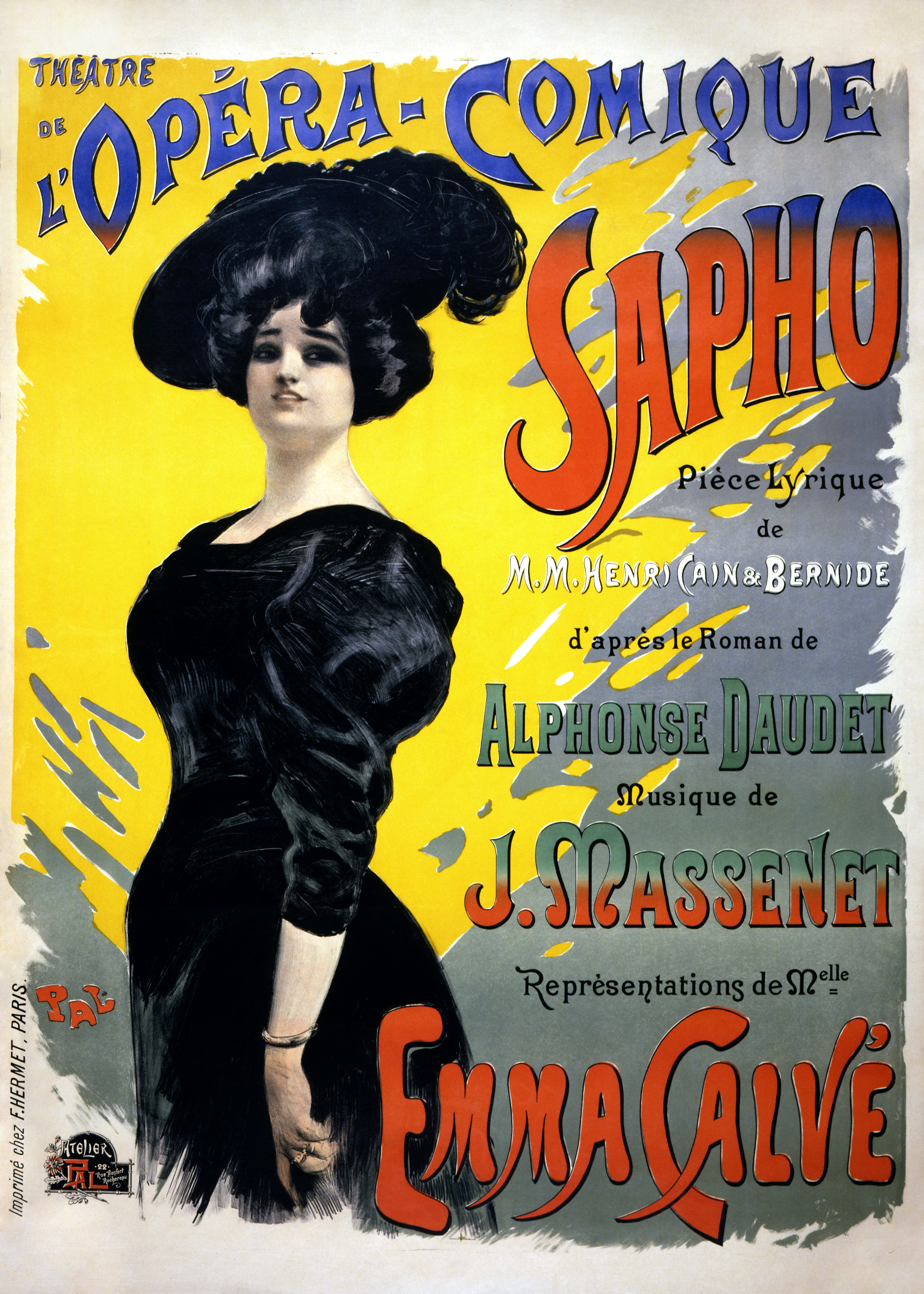
- Poster by Jean de Paleologu for the premiere
- Librettist: Henri Cain; Arthur Bernède
- Language: French
- Based on: Sappho by Alphonse Daudet
- Premiere: 27 November 1897; Opéra Comique, Paris

Sapho is a pièce lyrique ("lyric play", an opera in a declamatory style) in five acts. The music was composed by Jules Massenet to a French libretto by Henri Cain and Arthur Bernède, based on the novel (1884) of the same name by Alphonse Daudet. It was first performed on 27 November 1897 by the Opéra Comique at the Théâtre Lyrique on the Place du Châtelet in Paris with Emma Calvé as Fanny Legrand. A charming and effective piece, the success of which is highly dependent on the charisma of its lead soprano, it has never earned a place in the standard operatic repertory.

== Performance history ==
In its first production in 1897 Sapho was presented in a heavily truncated form of four tableaux, due to the limited availability of Calvé, as well as the approaching death of Daudet (who was a close friend of Massenet), and the acting deficiencies of the tenor Leprestre, who was playing the romantic lead role of Jean Gaussin. In this initial run at the Opéra-Comique, the opera received 42 performances.

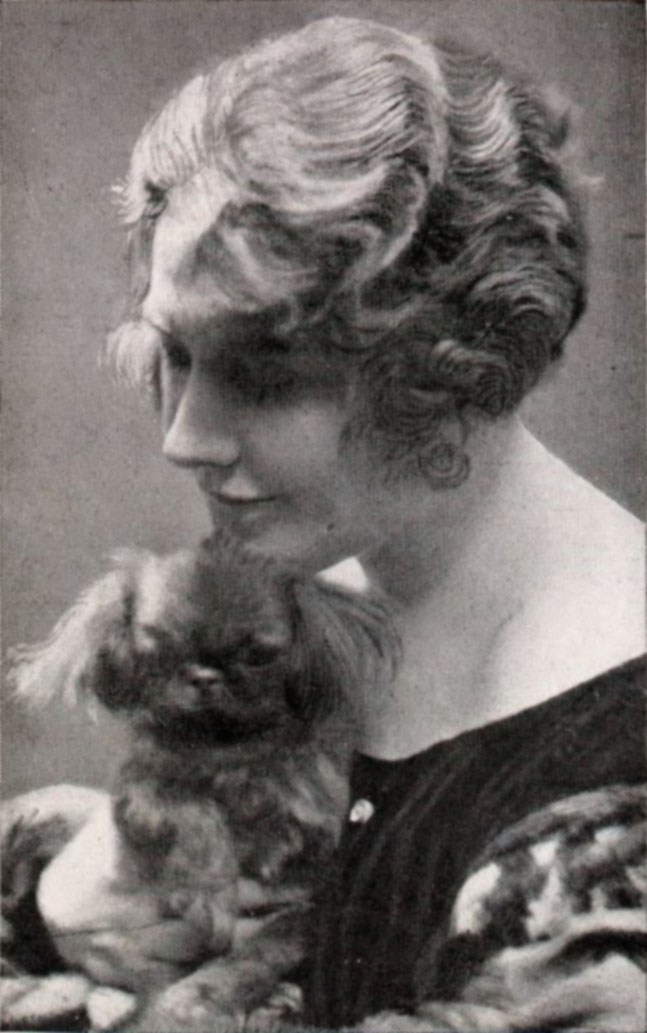
Marguerite Carré

A revised version, first performed on 22 January 1909 at the Salle Favart, contained a new, sixth scene, added as a second tableau to Act 3. The confrontation at the Ville d'Avray restaurant between Fanny, Jean and Caoudal, now Act 3 sc 1, was shortened, and elements of that added to a scene where Jean goes through Fanny's letters and discovers her past. This revival was produced by Albert Carré with decor by Amable and Lucien Jusseaume and costumes by Félix Fournery, and featured Carré's wife Marguerite Carré, who carried the show. It was revived again on 17 May 1916 and 23 February 1935 and had received a total of 126 representations by the time of its last performance at the Opéra-Comique in 1936.

The opera was first performed outside France on 14 April 1898 in Italian at the Teatro Lirico in Milan. This was followed by performances in 1898 in Geneva and 1899 in Lisbon, Alexandria, Algiers, Buenos Aires, Rio de Janeiro, and Bucharest. It was later given in Antwerp (1901), The Hague (1903), and Brussels (1903).

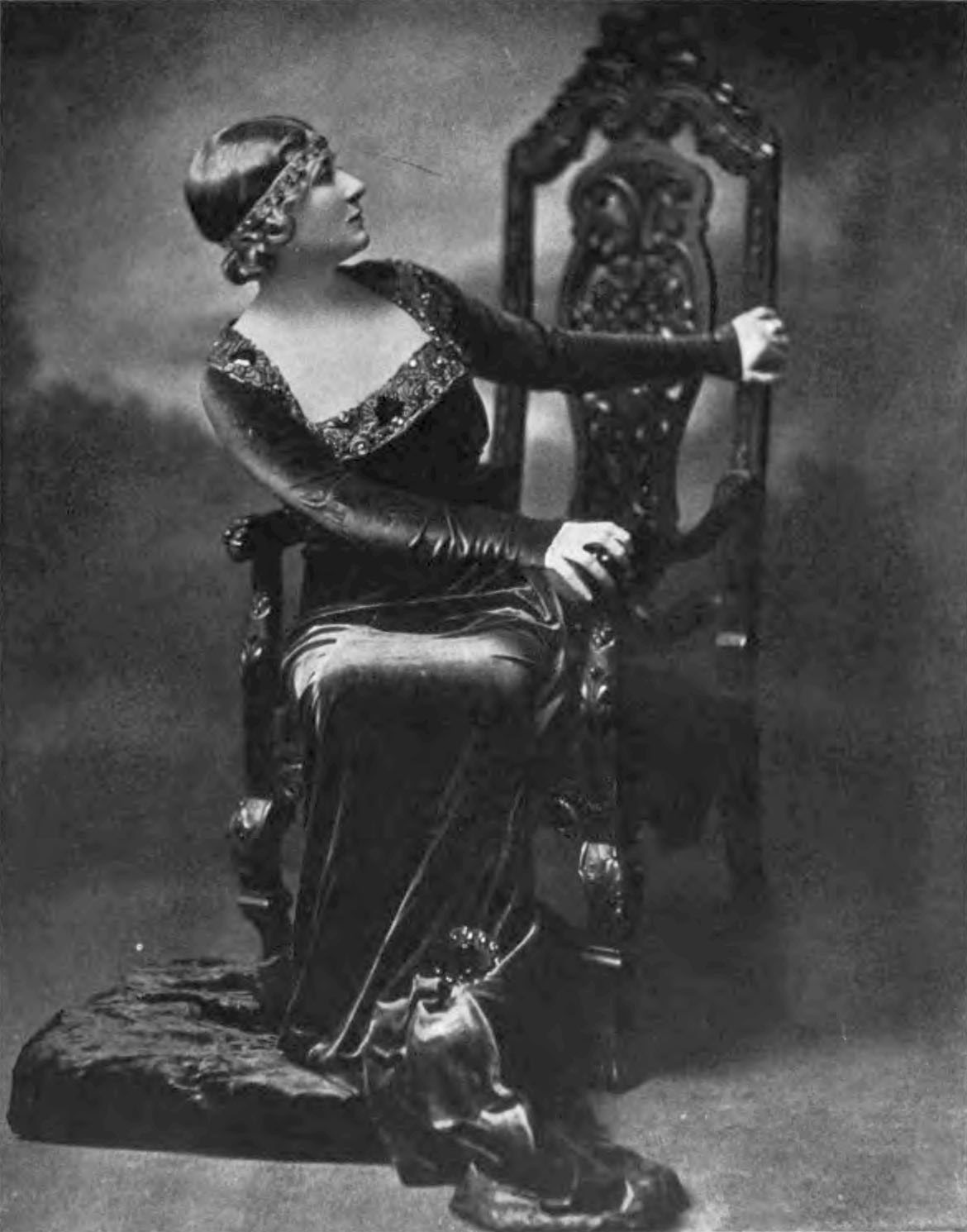
Mary Garden as Sappho

Beginning on 17 November 1909 the opera was presented in New York by Oscar Hammerstein at his Manhattan Opera House. It was sung in French with the popular Mary Garden as Fanny Legrand, but her performance was considered a disappointment. It was the third Massenet opera to be presented there within a ten-day period, the other two being Hérodiade (also a New York premiere) and Werther.

It was revived in a concert performance at Carnegie Hall on 23 January 1979 with Elisabeth Söderström as Fanny Legrand. Harold C. Schonberg, writing in The New York Times, commented:

It was fun to hear this dated piece, but the chances are that not many impresarios will be rushing to revive it. "Sapho" is, like so many of Massenet's operas, superbly professional. He wrote well for the voice, orchestrated expertly, knew exactly what he was doing. He well knew how to tickle his audience, and could be outrageously sentimental – as he is in the last act of "Sapho," with the solo violin weeping away in the famous Massenet kind of treacle. "Sapho" is a collation, with its quotes (deliberate) from other operas, its touch of folk music, its in-and-out dances, its opportunities for vocal and histrionic display. It is a "vehicle," ... and sopranos must love it.

The opera was also performed at Wexford Festival Opera in 2001 with Ermonela Jaho, and at the Massenet Festival in Saint-Étienne in 2003 conducted by Laurent Campellone.

== Roles ==
Role	Voice type	Premiere Cast, 27 November 1897 (Conductor: Jules Danbé)	Revised version 22 January 1909 (Conductor: François Ruhlmann)
Fanny Legrand, an artist's model	soprano	Emma Calvé	Marguerite Carré
Jean Gaussin, a young man	tenor	Julien Leprestre	Thomas Salignac
Irène, his adopted sister	soprano	Julia Guiraudon	Geneviève Mathieu-Lutz
Divonne, his mother	mezzo-soprano	Charlotte Wyns	Judith Lassalle
Césaire, his father	bass	André Gresse	Jean Delvoye
Caoudal, a sculptor	baritone	Marc-Nohel	Jean Périer
A farmer	tenor	Maurice Jacquet	Maurice Cazeneuve
A restaurant owner	baritone	Dufour	Hippolyte Belhomme
Chorus: Guests, strolling players, artists, gypsies.

== Synopsis ==
Place: Paris
Time: late 19th century

The story concerns the beautiful Sapho, an artist's model of a certain age and notorious life, whose real name is Fanny Legrand. She begins an affair with a young man, Jean Gaussin, but the relationship, as is so often the case in opera, is ill-fated.

=== Act 1 ===
A fancy ball at Caoudal's studio

Jean Gaussin is a shy and unsophisticated young man from Provence, who has come to Paris to study. At a costume ball given by the sculptor Caoudal, amid the noisy dance music and the mad whirl, the confused Gaussin withdraws and sings of his native country, in a broad and expressive cantabile, one of the few aria-like passages that the opera contains. Fanny, whose fancy is captured by this young man, so strangely different from her friends, promptly makes his acquaintance, and, as the guests are shouting for her to come to supper, takes him away with her.

=== Act 2 ===
Rooms of Jean Gaussin

Jean Gaussin is in his lodgings, where his parents are installing him as a student. He sings a song, "O Magali, ma tant amado", based on a traditional melody, which Gounod had already used in Mireille. It reappears later and adds a bit of Provençal local colour to the piece. Other than this song and a fragment of his aria from the first act, all is conversation in music, rapid and free declamation over a continually varied orchestral accompaniment.

Gaussin's father and mother and Irène, a "jeune fille," adopted by them, and evidently destined as the wife for Jean, say "good-bye". No sooner are they out the door than Fanny comes in, unannounced, immediately takes possession of Jean and the apartment, and drives out all memory of his parents. Here is more of the conversational style, interrupted by a duet between these two that has the accent of passion.

=== Act 3 ===
Scene 1: The restaurant at Ville-d'Avray

The lovers are at a little outdoor restaurant near Paris, and still very happy, as they sing together in another duet. There is an artists' dinner at the place, and as the diners arrive there is more lively chorusing and an imitation of a wandering band. By a chance word from Caoudal, Jean learns for the first time that his adored Fanny is none other than Sapho, the notorious model, and he is told something of her past. He is thunderstruck, and when Fanny reappears to join the party, she at once sees what has happened, as Jean turns upon her with rage and leaves. She sings her own rage in music much more declamatory than lyrical, and the scene is suddenly and violently brought to an end.

Scene 2: Fanny and Jean's house at Ville-d'Avray

Jean has returned to their house and finds a box belonging to Fanny containing letters from her past lovers. Fanny has followed him. He forces her to burn the letters after reading them first, learning that she has an illegitimate child whose father is a convicted forger. Finding it increasingly difficult to believe that he is her first and only true love, he brutally rejects her and leaves.

=== Act 4 ===
At Avignon

Jean has gone back to his parents in Provence. The "Magali" air is heard in the prelude, sung at a distance. Jean has come back to ask forgiveness, which he very promptly obtains from his mother, in a duet. This is followed by an affectionate air sung by Irène. Unexpectedly Sapho appears, with the obvious intention of reclaiming Jean. He receives her coldly and reminds her of her past and the impossibility of his rejoining her. Fanny is defeated in an encounter with his mother and goes away without him.

=== Act 5 ===
The little house at Ville-d'Avray

The long prelude to this act is titled "Solitude". Fanny is alone in the country lodging they previously shared and is about to leave, when Jean returns. She asks him to go again, but he will not have it, and says he is now ready to sacrifice all that life may hold for him. She promises to stay, but as he falls asleep in his chair, though convinced of his sincerity, she steals away and leaves him.

== Recordings ==
In 1903 the composer accompanied (on the piano) Georgette Leblanc on wax cylinder in an extract "Pendant un an je fus ta femme" from the opera. There are at least three recordings of the complete opera. A recording of a "live performance, London, September 1973" (released on LP c. 1974 by MRF Records, and on CD in 2005 on the Opera D'Oro label) features Milla Andrew as Sapho. A studio recording (released on LP in 1978 by EMI/Pathé Marconi and distributed in the US under the Peters International label; now available on CD) stars Renée Doria as Sapho. David L. Kirk, writing in Fanfare magazine says of the Opera D'Oro recording that "there are no distracting stage or audience noises. I suspect this CD is made from LP records because some surface noise is faintly audible. It is in stereo and the sound is okay." He also says the quality of the two performances is fairly equal, but the sound of the EMI recording is superior. The Wexford Festival performance is also available on CD.

- 1973: Milla Andrew (Fanny Legrand); Alexander Oliver (Jean Gaussin); George MacPherson (Césaire); Jenny Hill (Irène); Laura Sarti (Divonne); BBC Orchestra & Chorus; Bernard Keefe (conductor); Opera D’Oro OPD7015 (2 CDs: 125:20 ); recorded live in London in September 1973; released in 2005 at two quality levels: in the higher-priced "Grand Tier" format the packaging includes a booklet with notes and the complete libretto. Listings at WorldCat.
- 1978: Renée Doria (Fanny Legrand); Ginès Sirera (Jean Gaussin); Gisele Ory (Divonne); Adrien Legros (Césaire); Elya Waisman (Irène); René Gamboa (Caoudal); Christian Baudean (La Bordérie); Jean-Jacques Doumene (The restaurant keeper); Orchestre Symphonique de la Garde Républicaine; Roger Boutry (conductor); CDRG 103 (2 CDs: 129:28); no release date; CD includes booklet with notes, but no libretto. The LP version includes the French libretto. Listings at WorldCat.
- 2001: Giuseppina Piunti (Fanny Legrand); Brandon Jovanovich (Jean Gaussin); Agata Bienkowska (Divonne); Massimiliano Gagliardo (Césaire); Ermonela Jaho (Irène); Luca Salsii (Caoudal); Angel Pazos (La Bordérie); Nicolas Courjal (The restaurant keeper); Wexford Festival Opera Chorus; National Philharmonic Orchestra of Belarus; Jean-Pierre Tingaud (conductor); Fonè CD/SACD 023 (2 CDs: 124 minutes); notes and synopsis included. Listings at WorldCat.

== List of productions ==
Start date	Location, company, theatre	Language
27 November 1897	Paris, Opéra-Comique, Théâtre Lyrique	French
14 April 1898	Milan, Teatro Lirico	Italian
25 November 1898	Geneva, Théâtre Neuve	French
January 1899	Lisbon, Teatro de San Carlos	Italian
13 January 1899	Alexandria, Zizinia Theatre	Italian
March 1899	Algiers, Théâtre Municipal	French
4 June 1899	Buenos-Aires, Teatro Colón	Italian
15 August 1899	Rio de Janeiro, Teatro Lirico	Italian
21 December 1899	Bucharest, Teatrul Național	Italian
12 November 1901	Antwerp	French
February 1903	The Hague	French
3 November 1903	Brussels, Théâtre de la Monnaie	French
22 January 1909	Paris, Opéra-Comique, Salle Favart III	French
17 November 1909	New York, Manhattan Opera House	French
December 1909	Moscow, Bolshoi Theatre	Russian
27 December 1913	New Orleans, French Opera House	French
22 February 1919	Barcelona, Liceu	French
23 February 1935	Paris, Opéra-Comique, Salle Favart III	French
14 March 1967	London, St. Pancras Town Hall, Opera Concerts Ltd at the Camden Festival	
23 January 1979	New York, Carnegie Hall (concert)	French
26 October 2001	Wexford Festival Opera, Theatre Royal	French
7 November 2003	Saint-Étienne, Massenet Festival, Grand Théâtre Massenet	French
