= Claude Bendier =

Claude Bendier (died 1677) was a doctor of the Sorbonne, canon of Saint-Quentin, Aisne, and a well-known French bibliophile.

Born in Saint-Quentin in an unknown year, he always remained strongly attached to his native city, to which he bequeathed his 3000 volume library on the condition that it be open to the public twice a week. His Life of St. Quentin was read in many primary schools during the Restoration and the early reign of Louis-Philippe.

== Works ==
- 1671: La Défense des principales prérogatives de la ville et de l'église royale de S.-Quentin en Vermandois, par laquelle il est clairement justifié que cette ville est l'ancienne Auguste de Vermandois, et son église le siége primitif des évêques de ce diocèse. St-Quentin: Le Queux
- 1673: La vie du très illustre martyr, Saint-Quentin, apôtre et patron du Vermandois
  - --do.--Quatrième édition. Saint-Quentin : Vve C. Le Queux, 1696 (later editions appeared in 1828, 1840 and 1842)
- 1684: L'hérésie de Calvin détruite par sept preuves invincibles. Saint-Quentin: Vve C. Le Queux
  - --do.-- Saint-Quentin; et se vend à Paris: L. de Heuqueville, 1685
