= Frédérique Macarez =

French politician (born 1977)

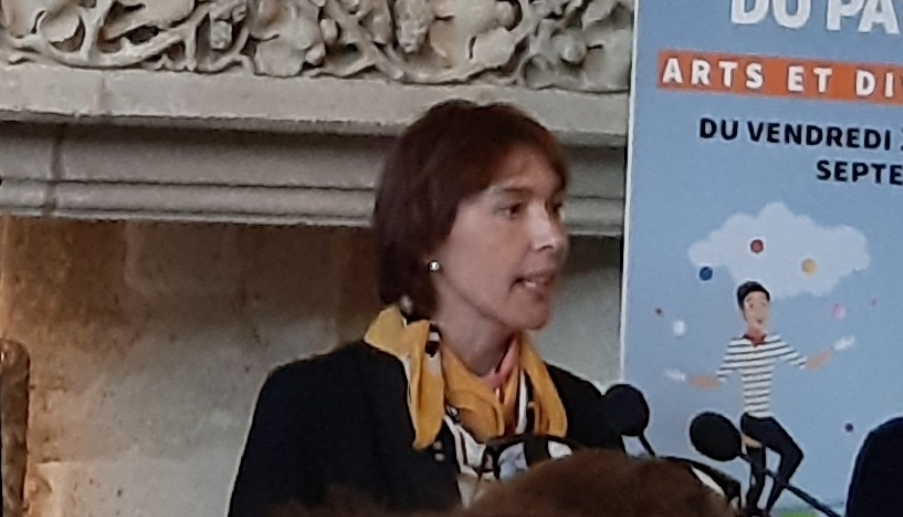
- Macarez in 2019

Mayor of Saint-Quentin
- Incumbent
- Assumed office 14 January 2016
- Preceded by: Xavier Bertrand

Personal details
- Born: 13 December 1977 (age 48)
- Party: The Republicans (since 2015)

Frédérique Macarez (born 13 December 1977) is a French politician who has served as mayor of Saint-Quentin since 2016. Since 2020, she has concurrently served as president of the communauté d'agglomération du Saint-Quentinois. She has been a member of the Regional Council of Hauts-de-France since 2021.
