= Hôtel de Ville, Saint-Quentin =

Town hall in Saint-Quentin, France

Hôtel de Ville
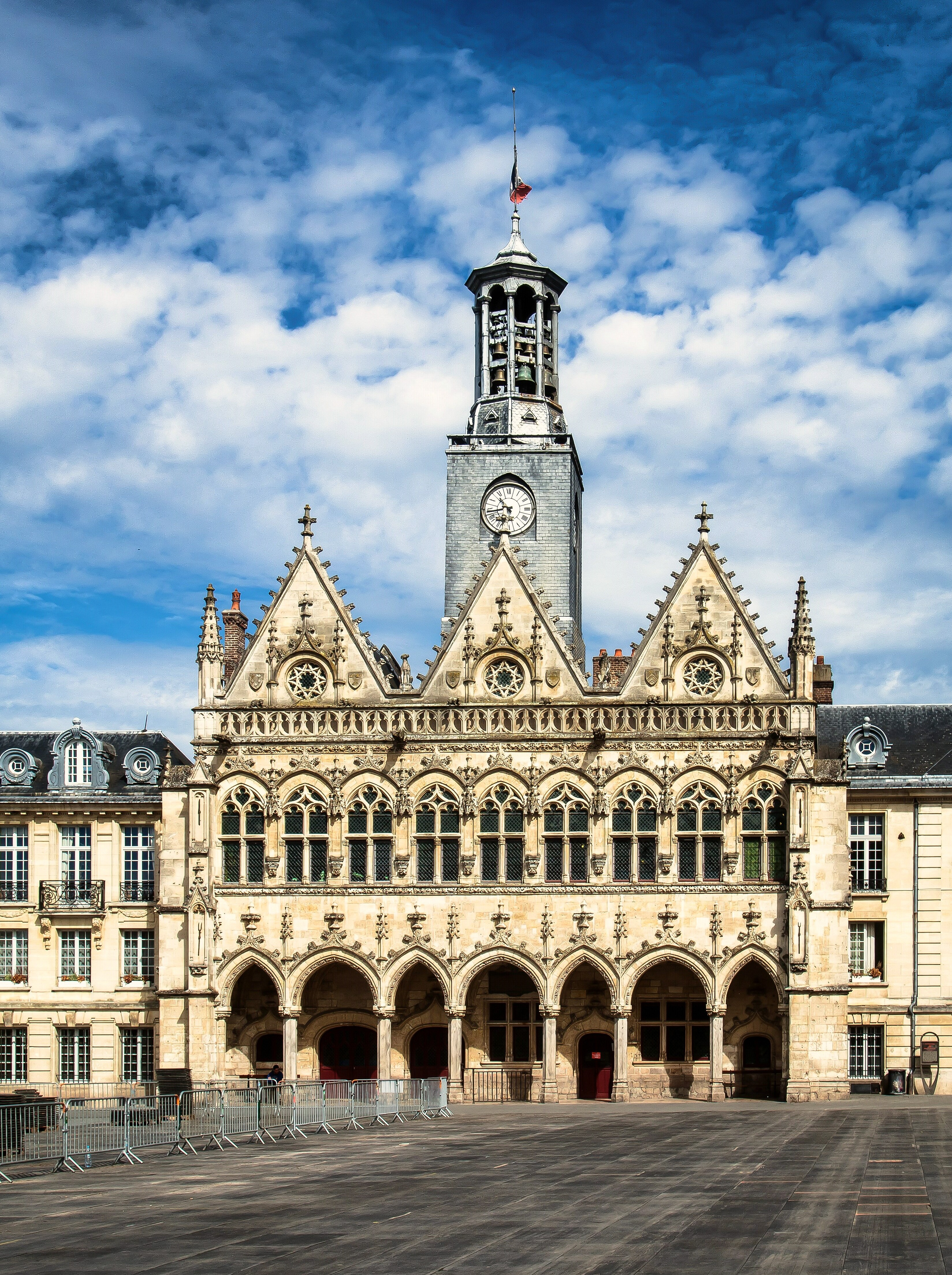
- The main frontage of the Hôtel de Ville in May 2017

General information
- Type: City hall
- Architectural style: Gothic Revival style
- Location: Saint-Quentin, France
- Coordinates: 49.8469°N 3.2872°E
- Completed: 1509

Design and construction
- Architect: Colard Noël

Monument historique
- Official name: Hôtel de ville
- Type: Inscrit
- Designated: 1984
- Reference no.: PA00115913

The Hôtel de Ville (French pronunciation: [otɛl də vil], City Hall) is a municipal building in Saint-Quentin, Aisne, northern France, standing on Place l'Hôtel de Ville. It was designated a monument historique by the French government in 1984.

== History ==
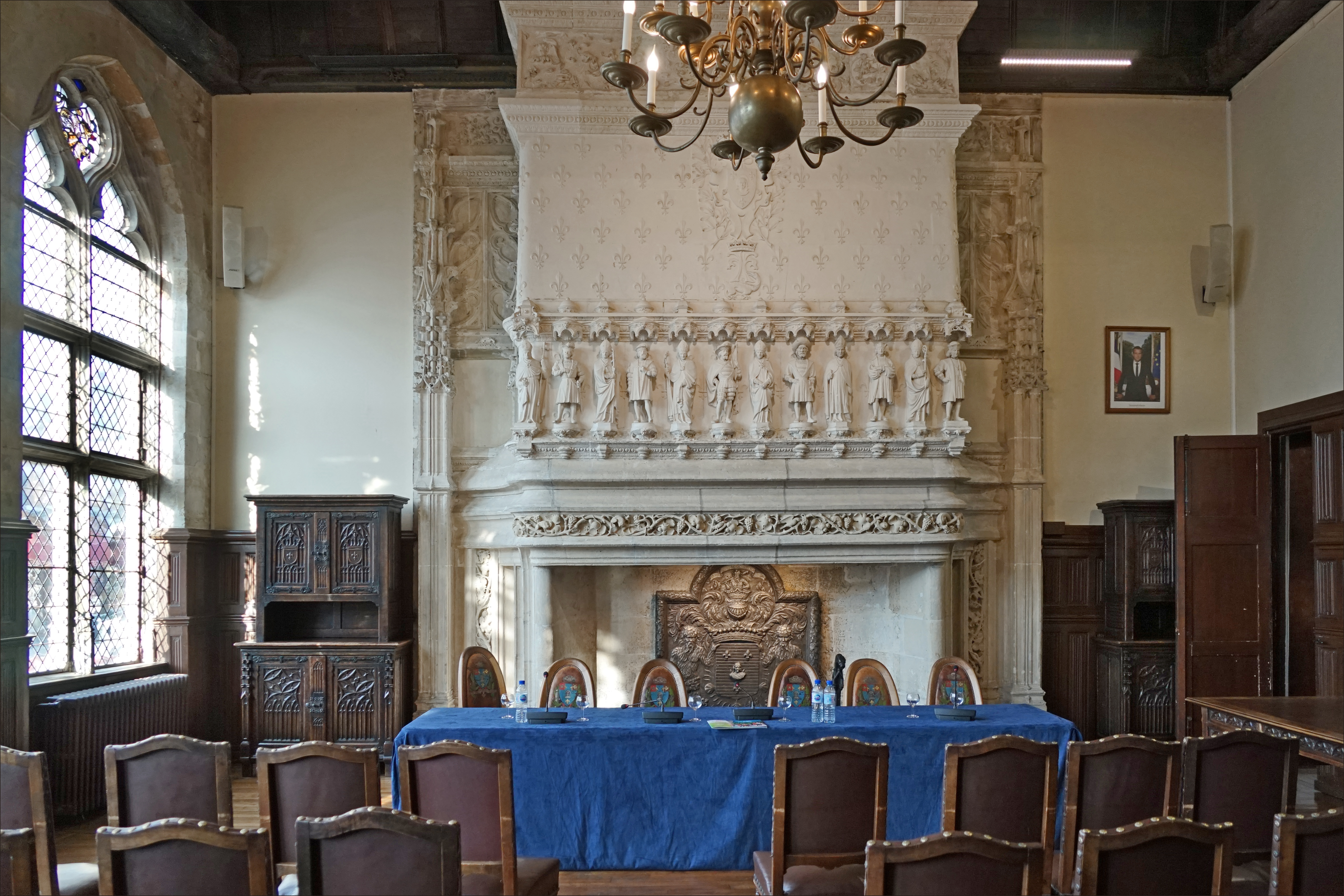
The wedding room

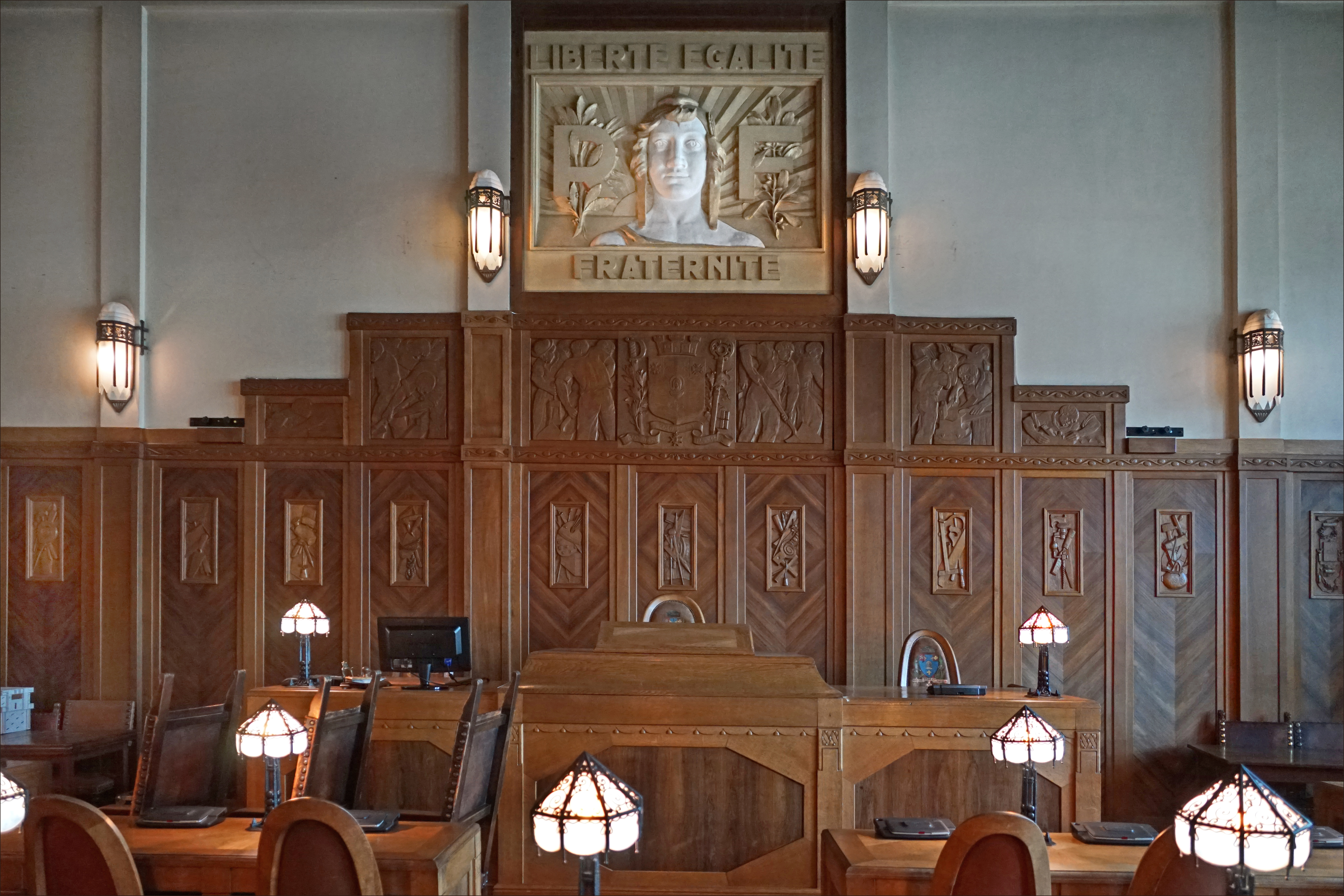
The council chamber

The first town hall in Saint-Quentin was the Maison du Plaid or Maison de la Paix which served as the meeting place of the provost and aldermen from the mid-13th century. The provost assembled the bourgeoisie of the town there to consider pleas in 1332. The building contained two rooms: the Chambre du Haut Banquet (the banqueting hall) and the Chambre de Jugement (courtroom), and there was a square tower at the rear, which was used to store the municipal archives.

In the late 15th century, the aldermen decided to demolish the existing building and to commission a new town hall. Construction of the new town hall started in the late 15th century. It was designed by Colard Noël from Valenciennes (who was also involved in rebuilding part of the Basilica of Saint-Quentin), built in ashlar stone and was completed in 1509. The design involved a symmetrical main frontage facing onto Place l'Hôtel de Ville. The ground floor featured a loggia formed by seven arches of varying widths with moulded surrounds and ornate carvings. The first floor was fenestrated by nine mullioned and transomed windows with tracery, moulded surroundings and ornate carvings. At roof level, there was a parapet with tracery and three gables each containing an oculus, with finials at the corners.

Internally, the principal rooms were the Salle du Conseil (council chamber) and L'Auditoire (audience chamber). The council chamber featured a fireplace with a large hood decorated with statuettes of the peers of France. It also featured a ceiling in the form of an upturned boat, decorated with painted stars and six carved heads depicting six significant characters of the town the 15th century.

On 9 December 1589, the aldermen of the town entertained Henry IV in the council chamber. An octagonal belfry, which was supported by a square base and equipped with 37 bells, was erected behind the centre gable in 1663. After it became unstable, it was restored in 1759.

The town hall, like many other buildings in the town, was badly damaged by German shelling during the First Battle of the Somme in March 1918. It was close to collapse when troops of the French First Army led by General Marie Eugène Debeney entered the town on 1 October 1918.

A major programme of restoration works, undertaken to a design by Louis Guindez was completed in 1926. The work involved restoring the fabric of the former council chamber and converting it for use as the Salle des Mariages (wedding room). It also involved converting the audience chamber into a completely new council chamber, designed in the Art Deco style. The new council chamber was lined with 41 wooden panels crafted in rosewood and Hungarian oak by the local cabinetmaker and carpenter, Émile Boussu. Above the mayor's chair was a wooden panel carved in bas-relief by Alphonse Émile Fivetto depicting Marianne.

During the liberation of the town by French Forces of the Interior on 2 September 1944, during the Second World War, a skirmish took place outside the town hall with the liberators being fired upon from a German military vehicle.

== Sources ==
- Gomart, Charles (1858). "Etude sur l'hotel-de-ville de Saint-Quentin". Saint-Quentin: Doloy.
