= Augusta Viromanduorum =

Ancient Gallo-Roman settlement

Coordinates: 49.8486°N 3.2864°E

Augusta Viromanduorum is an ancient Gallo-Roman settlement, corresponding to the modern city of Saint-Quentin (Aisne, Hauts-de-France).

== Name ==
The settlement is mentioned as Au̓goústa Ou̓iromandúōn (Αὐγούστα <Οὐι>ρομανδύων) by Ptolemy (2nd c. AD), Augusta Veromandorum in the Antonine Itinerary, Aug. Viro Muduorum on the Tabula Peutingeriana (5th c.), Viromandensim oppidum by Gregory of Tours (6th c.), and possibly as Civitas Veromandorum by the Notitia Galliarum (ca. 400).

== History ==
Augusta Viromandorum, was founded during the reign of Emperor Augustus, just 11km away from Vermand, the main oppidum of the Viromandui. Closer to an important trade route between Italy and the port of Boulogne, Augusta Viromandorum soon replaced Vermand as the main settlement of the region. It reached a size of 40–60ha during the Roman era, in the average of Gallo-Roman chief towns.

During the 4th century, the lack of archaeological evidence suggests that the settlement was deserted or its population considerably reduced. Some scholars have argued that Vermand replaced Augusta as the capital from this period up until the regional prominence shifted definitely to Saint-Quentin in the 9th century. This "fluctuation" of power could be explained by the insecurities of the period, which led the local inhabitants to seek protection in the old oppidum situated nearby, since Saint-Quentin did not possess a castrum. Malsy (2001) rejects this hypothesis, and Beaujard and Prévot (2004) doubt it.
