= Lucien Jusseaume =

French painter

Louis Hubert called Lucien Jusseaume (10 February 1861 – 8 July 1925) was a French decor painter.

== Biography ==
Born in the 19th arrondissement of Paris, Lucien Jusseaume was the son of Nicolas-Cyprien Jusseaume (b.1833), painter decorator, and Marguerite Pagand (b.1826). He married Berthe Lagoutte c. 1925.

He is considered one of the greatest theater designers, who always remained attached to the principle of realistic decor. He worked for the Théâtre Libre and also for the Comédie-Française before 1898, then almost exclusively for the Opera-Comique for a quarter of a century.

Together with Eugène Ronsin, Jusseaume was responsible for the original sets of Pelléas et Mélisande (1902). Through traveling he was inspired by real scenery, like for Carmen, Le Juif polonais (in Alsace), and Mireille (in Provence). He is particularly remembered for the setting of the act "La Forêt" in Chantecler by Edmond Rostand.

Among his other works are King Lear, Julius Caesar, Sapho, Ramuntcho, L'Honneur japonais (Théâtre de l'Odéon), Louise, Pénélope, Lorenzaccio, L'Enfant roi (Opéra-Comique).

He committed suicide in 1925 at his home 17 rue Vicq-d'Azir in the 10th arrondissement of Paris.
