= Vermand =

- Commune
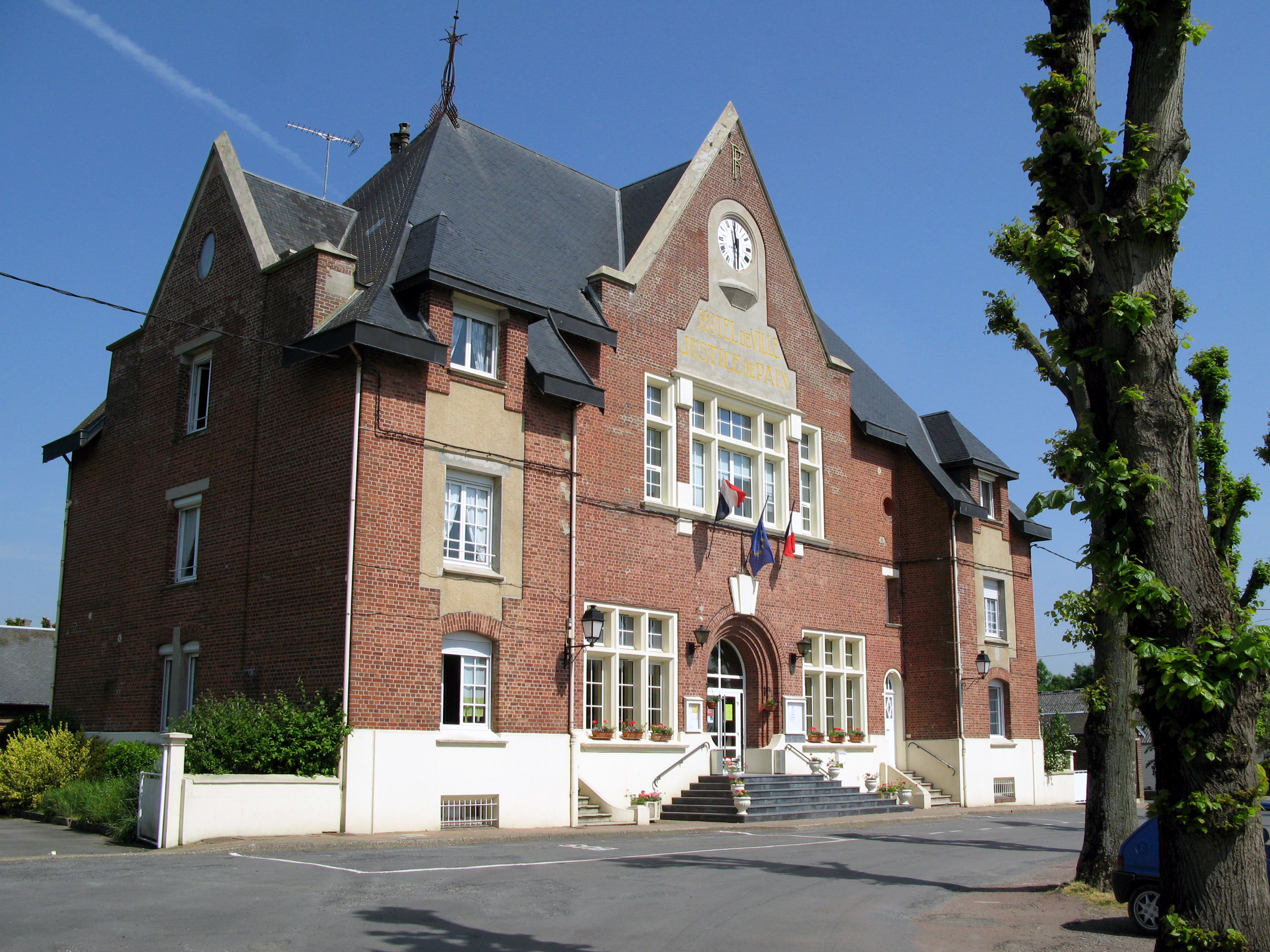
- Town hall

- Coat of arms
- Location of Vermand
- Location within France Location within Hauts-de-France
- Coordinates: 49°52′N 3°09′E
- Country: France
- Region: Hauts-de-France
- Department: Aisne
- Arrondissement: Saint-Quentin
- Canton: Saint-Quentin-1
- Intercommunality: Pays du Vermandois

Government
  - Mayor (2026–32): Jean-Pierre Boniface
- Area^{1}: 15.75 km^{2} (6.08 sq mi)
- Population (2023): 1,104
  - Density: 70.10/km^{2} (181.5/sq mi)
- Time zone: UTC+01:00 (CET)
  - Summer (DST): UTC+02:00 (CEST)
- INSEE/Postal code: 02785 /02490
- ^{1} French Land Register data, which excludes lakes, ponds, glaciers > 1 km^{2} (0.386 sq mi or 247 acres) and river estuaries.

Vermand (French pronunciation: [vɛʁmɑ̃]; Picard: Vermind) is a commune in the Aisne department in Hauts-de-France in northern France.

== History ==
Vermand was probably the original capital of the Viromandui, after whom the region of Vermandois is named. During the reign of Emperor Augustus, it was displaced by the Roman settlement of Augusta Viromanduorum, modern Saint-Quentin.

== Population ==
Historical population
Year	Pop.	±% p.a.
1968	1,135	—
1975	1,165	+0.37%
1982	1,163	−0.02%
1990	1,118	−0.49%
1999	1,069	−0.50%
2007	1,040	−0.34%
2012	1,061	+0.40%
2017	1,092	+0.58%
2023	1,104	+0.18%
Source: INSEE

== See also ==
- Communes of the Aisne department
