= Saint-Quentin, Aisne =

Saint-Quentin Saint-Kintin (Picard)
- Subprefecture
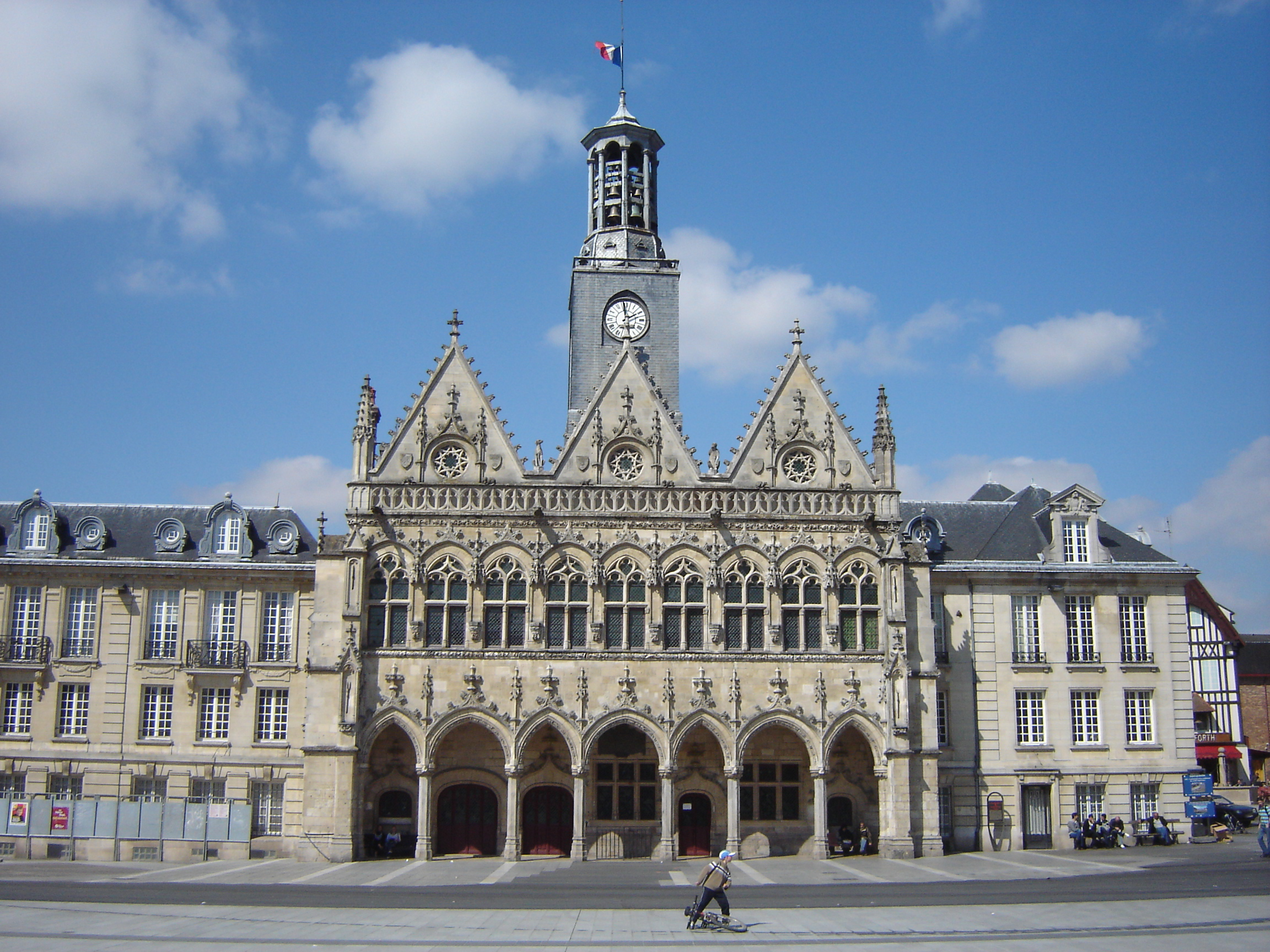
- Hôtel de Ville (town hall)

- Coat of arms
- Location of Saint-Quentin
- Location within France Location within Hauts-de-France
- Coordinates: 49°50′55″N 3°17′11″E
- Country: France
- Region: Hauts-de-France
- Department: Aisne
- Arrondissement: Saint-Quentin
- Canton: Saint-Quentin-1, 2 and 3
- Intercommunality: CA Saint-Quentinois

Government
  - Mayor (2026–32): Frédérique Macarez
- Area^{1}: 22.56 km^{2} (8.71 sq mi)
- Elevation: 74 m (243 ft)
- Highest elevation: 125 m (410 ft)
- Lowest elevation: 68 m (223 ft)
- Population (2023): 52,813
  - Density: 2,341/km^{2} (6,063/sq mi)
- Time zone: UTC+01:00 (CET)
  - Summer (DST): UTC+02:00 (CEST)
- INSEE/Postal code: 02691 /02100
- ^{1} French Land Register data, which excludes lakes, ponds, glaciers > 1 km^{2} (0.386 sq mi or 247 acres) and river estuaries.

Saint-Quentin (French: [sɛ̃ kɑ̃tɛ̃]; Picard: Saint-Kintin; older Dutch: Sint-Kwintens [sɪnt ˈkʋɪntəns]) is a city in the Aisne department, Hauts-de-France, northern France. It has been identified as the Augusta Veromanduorum of antiquity. It is named after Saint Quentin of Amiens, who is said to have been martyred there in the 3rd century.

== Administration ==
Saint-Quentin is a sub-prefecture of Aisne. Although Saint-Quentin is by far the largest city in Aisne, the capital is the third-largest city, Laon.

== Mayors ==
The mayor of Saint-Quentin is Frédérique Macarez, a member of the centre-right LR Party.

List of mayors
| From | To | Name | Party |
|---|---|---|---|
| 2016 | present | Frédérique Macarez | LR |
| 2010 | 2016 | Xavier Bertrand | UMP |
| 1995 | 2010 | Pierre André | UMP |
| 1989 | 1995 | Daniel Le Meur | PCF |
| 1983 | 1989 | Jacques Braconnier | RPR |
| 1977 | 1983 | Daniel Le Meur | PCF |
| 1966 | 1977 | Jacques Braconnier | UDR |

== History ==
The city was founded by the Romans, in the Augustean period, to replace the oppidum of Vermand (11 km away) as the capital of Viromandui (Celtic Belgian people who occupied the region). It received the name "Augusta Viromanduorum", Augusta of the Viromandui, in honor of the emperor Augustus. The site is that of a ford across the River Somme. During the late Roman period, it is possible that the civitas capital was transferred back to Vermand (whose name comes from Veromandis); almost nothing relating to the fourth century has been found in Saint-Quentin.

During the early Middle Ages, a major monastery, now the Basilica of Saint-Quentin, developed, based on pilgrimage to the tomb of Quentin, a Roman Christian who came to evangelize the region and was martyred in Augusta, giving rise to a new town which was named after him.

From the 9th century, Saint-Quentin was the capital of Vermandois County. From the 10th century, the counts of Vermandois (descendants of the Carolingian, then Capetian families) were very powerful. The city grew rapidly: the "bourgeois" organized themselves and obtained, in the second half of the 12th century (a very early date), a municipal charter, which guaranteed their commune a large degree of autonomy.

At the beginning of the 13th century, Saint-Quentin entered the royal domain. At that time, it was a thriving city, based on its wool textile industry (city "drapante"). It was also a centre of commerce boosted by its position on the border of the kingdom of France, between the Champagne fairs and the cities of Flanders (wine exportation, etc.): it had an important annual fair. It also benefited from its location in the heart of a rich agricultural region (trade of grain and "guède" (woad), a high-value blue dye).

From the 14th century, Saint-Quentin suffered from this strategic position: it endured the French-English wars (Hundred Years' War). In the 15th century, the city was disputed between the king of France and the dukes of Burgundy (it is one of the "cities of the Somme"). Ravaged by the plague on several occasions, its population decreased, while its economy was in crisis: its fair was increasingly irrelevant, and agricultural production diminished. The declining textile industry turned to the production of linen canvas. Meanwhile, the city faced major expenses to maintain its fortifications and armed troops.

Between the end of the 15th century and the mid-17th century, this strategic position was the cause of frequent misfortune. In 1557, a siege by the Spanish army (as part of the battle of Saint-Quentin) ended with the looting of the city and its desertion for two years. Given back to France in 1559, it underwent intense fortification work: the medieval wall, redesigned several times, was protected by many new advanced fortifications. Two districts were razed to make way for them. In the mid-17th century, the city escaped the sieges, but suffered the horrors of wars ravaging the Picardy region, accompanied by the plague (in 1636, 3,000 people died, out of perhaps 10,000 inhabitants) and famine.

In the second half of the 17th century, the conquests of Louis XIV moved the border away from Saint-Quentin, and it lost much of its strategic role. At the end of the 16th century, its textile production specialized in fine flax canvas (batiste and lawn). This brought prosperity, particularly in the 18th century, when these textiles were exported across Europe and the Americas.

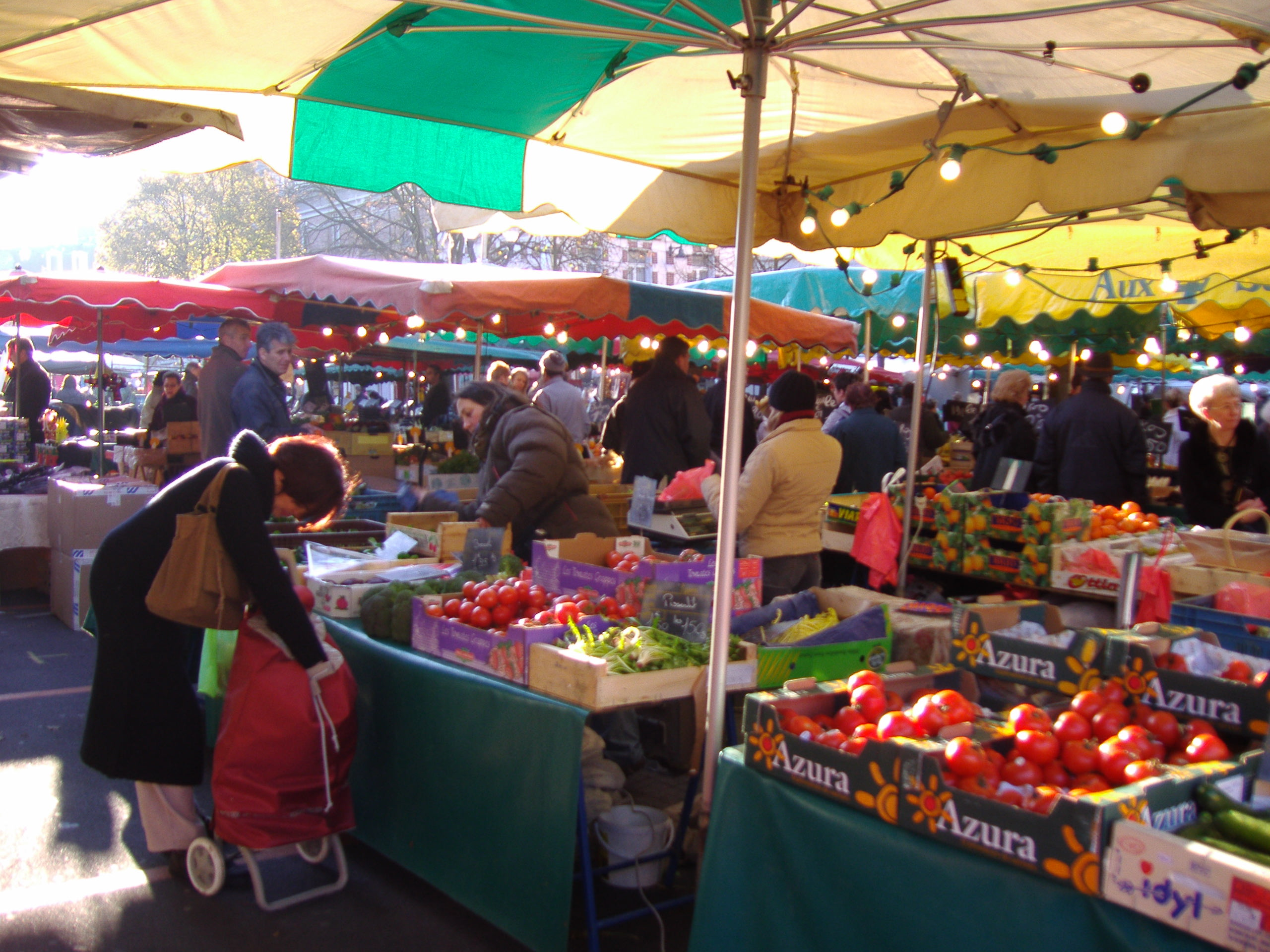
The market

During the First French Empire, difficulties in the export market brought economic decline. At the request of the municipality, Napoleon ordered the razing of the fortifications, to allow the city to grow beyond its old boundaries. In 1814–1815, Saint-Quentin was occupied by the Russian army, but without any damage.

In the 19th century, Saint-Quentin developed into a thriving industrial city, thanks to entrepreneurs constantly on the lookout for new technologies. Textiles and mechanical devices were foremost among a wide variety of products.

In 1870, during the Franco-Prussian War, the population repelled the Prussians on 8 October, but the city fell during the second offensive. The hopeless but heroic action had national repercussions: Saint-Quentin was decorated with the Legion of Honour. On 19 January 1871 the French army was defeated near the town.

During the repression of January and February 1894, the police conducted raids targeting the anarchists living there, without much success.

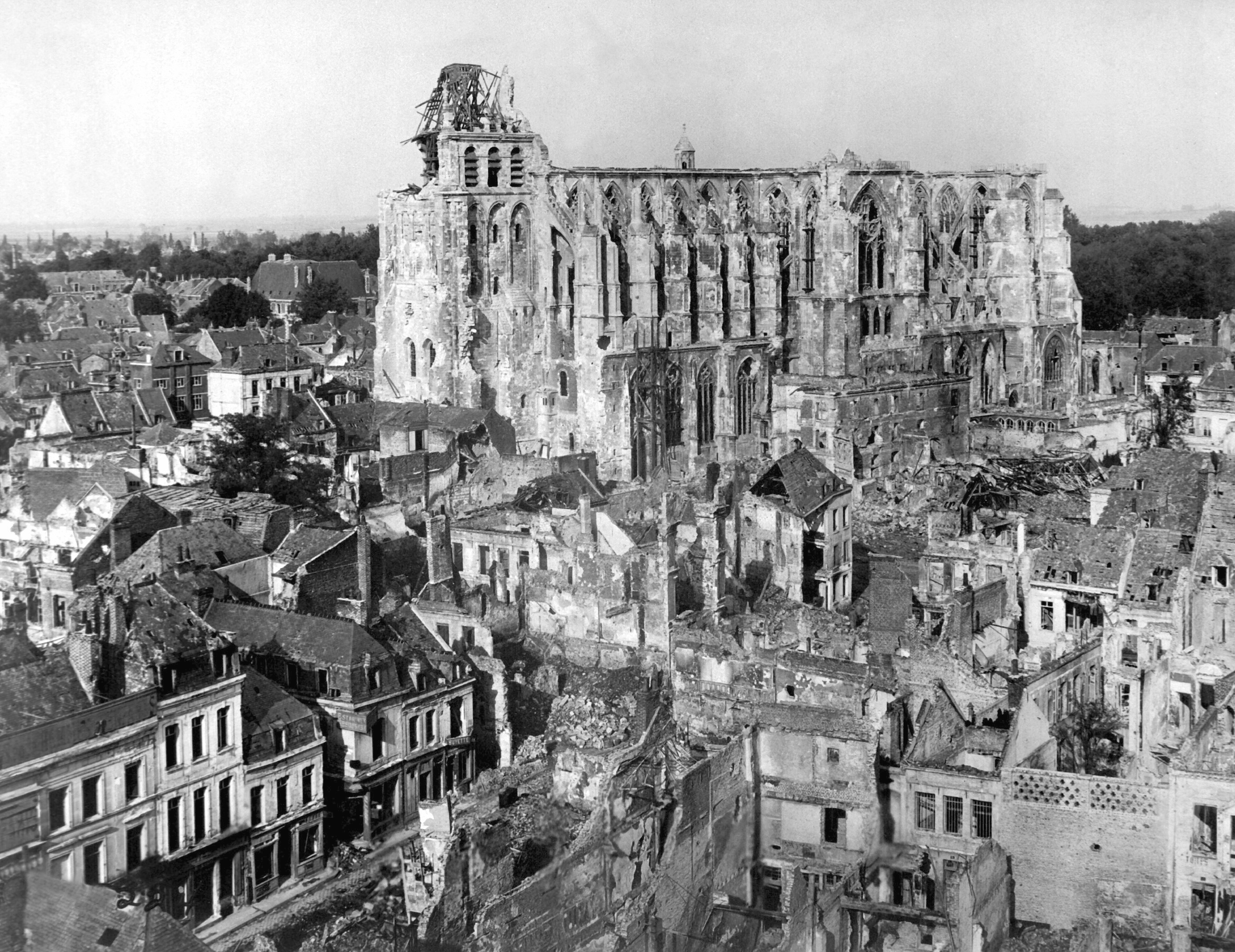
Ruins in Saint-Quentin during the First World War.

The First World War hit Saint-Quentin very hard. In September 1914, the city was overrun; it endured a harsh occupation. From 1916, it lay at the heart of the war zone, because the Germans had integrated it into the Hindenburg Line. After the evacuation of the population in March, the town was systematically looted and industrial equipment removed or destroyed. The fighting destroyed it: 80% of buildings (including the Basilica of Saint-Quentin) were damaged.

Despite national support, the reconstruction process was long, and the city struggled to regain its pre-1914 dynamism. The 1911 population of 55,000 was achieved again only in the mid-1950s, in the context of general economic expansion. This prosperity continued until the mid-1970s, when the French textile industry began to suffer through competition from developing countries.

== Climate ==
Climate data for Saint-Quentin, elevation: 98 m (322 ft) (1991–2020 normals, extremes 1933–present)
| Month | Jan | Feb | Mar | Apr | May | Jun | Jul | Aug | Sep | Oct | Nov | Dec | Year |
|---|---|---|---|---|---|---|---|---|---|---|---|---|---|
| Record high °C (°F) | 14.9 (58.8) | 19.2 (66.6) | 23.6 (74.5) | 27.8 (82.0) | 31.9 (89.4) | 37.3 (99.1) | 40.7 (105.3) | 38.0 (100.4) | 34.0 (93.2) | 27.8 (82.0) | 19.9 (67.8) | 16.8 (62.2) | 40.7 (105.3) |
| Mean daily maximum °C (°F) | 6.0 (42.8) | 7.1 (44.8) | 11.2 (52.2) | 15.0 (59.0) | 18.4 (65.1) | 21.5 (70.7) | 24.0 (75.2) | 23.9 (75.0) | 20.2 (68.4) | 15.2 (59.4) | 9.8 (49.6) | 6.5 (43.7) | 14.9 (58.8) |
| Daily mean °C (°F) | 3.6 (38.5) | 4.2 (39.6) | 7.2 (45.0) | 10.0 (50.0) | 13.4 (56.1) | 16.2 (61.2) | 18.4 (65.1) | 18.4 (65.1) | 15.2 (59.4) | 11.4 (52.5) | 6.9 (44.4) | 4.1 (39.4) | 10.8 (51.4) |
| Mean daily minimum °C (°F) | 1.1 (34.0) | 1.2 (34.2) | 3.1 (37.6) | 4.9 (40.8) | 8.3 (46.9) | 11.0 (51.8) | 12.9 (55.2) | 12.9 (55.2) | 10.3 (50.5) | 7.6 (45.7) | 4.1 (39.4) | 1.7 (35.1) | 6.6 (43.9) |
| Record low °C (°F) | −20.0 (−4.0) | −18.6 (−1.5) | −11.5 (11.3) | −7.8 (18.0) | −2.1 (28.2) | 0.0 (32.0) | 3.5 (38.3) | 3.2 (37.8) | −1.0 (30.2) | −4.8 (23.4) | −9.6 (14.7) | −14.6 (5.7) | −20.0 (−4.0) |
| Average precipitation mm (inches) | 54.1 (2.13) | 48.0 (1.89) | 51.3 (2.02) | 43.2 (1.70) | 57.1 (2.25) | 59.8 (2.35) | 60.2 (2.37) | 70.8 (2.79) | 51.4 (2.02) | 60.3 (2.37) | 56.8 (2.24) | 70.4 (2.77) | 683.4 (26.91) |
| Average precipitation days (≥ 1.0 mm) | 10.7 | 10.1 | 10.0 | 9.2 | 9.6 | 9.1 | 8.8 | 9.4 | 9.0 | 10.3 | 11.4 | 12.2 | 119.9 |
| Mean monthly sunshine hours | 61.7 | 79.2 | 134.8 | 182.6 | 205.7 | 207.7 | 213.8 | 206.5 | 167.1 | 115.7 | 66.9 | 54.2 | 1,695.8 |
Source: Meteociel

== Population ==
Historical population

| Year | Pop. | ±% p.a. |
|---|---|---|
| 1793 | 10,800 | — |
| 1800 | 10,477 | −0.43% |
| 1806 | 10,535 | +0.09% |
| 1821 | 12,351 | +1.07% |
| 1831 | 17,686 | +3.66% |
| 1836 | 20,570 | +3.07% |
| 1841 | 21,400 | +0.79% |
| 1846 | 23,852 | +2.19% |
| 1851 | 24,953 | +0.91% |
| 1856 | 26,887 | +1.50% |
| 1861 | 30,790 | +2.75% |
| 1866 | 32,690 | +1.20% |
| 1872 | 34,811 | +1.05% |
| 1876 | 38,924 | +2.83% |
| 1881 | 45,838 | +3.32% |
| 1886 | 47,353 | +0.65% |
| 1891 | 47,551 | +0.08% |
| 1896 | 48,868 | +0.55% |
| 1901 | 50,278 | +0.57% |

| Year | Pop. | ±% p.a. |
|---|---|---|
| 1906 | 52,768 | +0.97% |
| 1911 | 55,571 | +1.04% |
| 1921 | 37,345 | −3.90% |
| 1926 | 49,683 | +5.88% |
| 1931 | 49,448 | −0.09% |
| 1936 | 49,028 | −0.17% |
| 1946 | 48,556 | −0.10% |
| 1954 | 53,866 | +1.31% |
| 1962 | 61,071 | +1.58% |
| 1968 | 64,196 | +0.84% |
| 1975 | 67,243 | +0.66% |
| 1982 | 63,567 | −0.80% |
| 1990 | 60,644 | −0.59% |
| 1999 | 59,066 | −0.29% |
| 2007 | 56,471 | −0.56% |
| 2012 | 56,217 | −0.09% |
| 2017 | 53,816 | −0.87% |
| 2023 | 52,813 | −0.31% |

Source: EHESS and INSEE (1968–2023)

== Culture ==
=== Monuments ===
- Basilica of Saint-Quentin, built in the 12th–15th century. Heavily damaged in World War I, the vaults, windows and roofs have been restored.
- Hôtel de Ville (town hall), built between 1331 and 1509 in a gothic style. L'hôtel de ville of Saint-Quentin is famous for its peal of 37 bells. It was modified in the 19th century and heavily restored in 1926 in Art Déco style.
- The municipal theatre Jean-Vilar, built in 1844.
- The city has several beguinages, dating from the middle ages.
- The Fervaques Palace: built between 1897 and 1911, it is the home of the High Court.
- The Porte des Canonniers, a 17th-century city gate

=== Museums ===
- Butterflies' Museum which has a collection of more than 600,000 insects, displaying 20,000 of them
- Antoine Lecuyer Museum which owns the largest collection of Maurice Quentin de La Tour's pastels
- Academic Society, archaeologic museum Société Académique de Saint-Quentin

== Transport ==
The Gare de Saint-Quentin is the railway station, offering connections to Paris, Reims, Amiens, Lille and several regional destinations. The A26 motorway connects Saint-Quentin with Reims and Calais, the A29 with Amiens.

== Personalities ==
- Viviane Adjutor, basketball player
- Alexandre Avez (1858–1896), politician
- François-Noël Babeuf (1760–1797), known as Gracchus Babeuf, political agitator and journalist of the revolutionary period
- Quentin-Claude Bendier (died 1677), scholar and bibliophile
- Anthony Benezet, American abolitionist
- Xavier Bertrand (born 1965), former Minister of Labour, Social Relations, Family and Solidarity in François Fillon's second government, conservative
- Charles de Bouelles (1479–1567), philosopher, mathematician and linguist
- Édouard Lucien Briquet (1854–1905) (engineer, left Paris under siege, going to work on the construction of the Trans-Saharan Railroad, in the 1870s. He moved to Brazil in 1883, working on several railroads in the interior of the country.
- William Cliff, inventor of machine-woven tulle
- Félix Davin (1807–1836), poet and journalist
- Marc Delmas (1885–1931), Expressionist composer and biographer
- Dudo of Saint-Quentin (born c.965), historian
- Antoine Francisque (c.1570–1605), lutenist and composer
- Jules Gallay (1822–1897), lawyer and music historian
- Rudy Gobert (born 1992), professional basketball player for the Minnesota Timberwolves of the NBA; 4x Defensive Player of the Year
- Kafetien Gomis (born 1980), athlete
- Maïa Hirsch (born 2003), basketball player drafted by the Minnesota Lynx of the WNBA in 2023.
- Jean-Marie Lefèvre (born 1953), modernist and minimalist poet
- Jean Leune (1889–1944), war correspondent, writer, military officer, and member of the French Resistance
- Jeanne-Marie de Maille (1331–1414), saint
- Étienne Mendy (born 1969), footballer
- Jean Louis Marie Poiret (1755–1834), botanist and explorer
- Charles Rogier (1800–1885), Belgian statesman
- Philippe Taquet (1940–2025), paleontologist
- Andre Trocme, pacifist Protestant church leader
- Yves Velan (1925–2017), Swiss writer
- Alexis Yetna, basketball player

== Artists ==
- Pierre Berton (16th century), known as "Pierre de Saint-Quentin", stonecutter
- Mathieu (de) Bléville, born in Saint-Quentin at the beginning of the 16th century, painter on glass
- Ulysse Butin (1838–1883), painter
- John Cross, (1819–1861), English painter who studied at the Saint-Quentin School of Design
- Benoît Delépine (1958–), scriptwriter, actor
- Michel Dorigny (1617–1665), painter and printmaker, professor at the Painting Academy of Paris
- Delphine Gleize (1973–), film director
- Paul Guiramand, (1926–2007), painter and winner of the grand prix de Rome in 1953
- Édouard Hippolyte Margottet (1848–1887), painter
- Maurice Quentin de La Tour (1704–1788), pastellist, official portrait painter to Louis XV, benefactor of the city (founder of the Maurice Quentin de La Tour School of Design)
- Arthur Midy (1887–1944), painter
- Amédée Ozenfant (1886–1966), leader of Purism, an avant-garde movement of the 1920s.
- Jean-Christophe Paré, (1957–) dancer and teacher
- Julie-Marie Parmentier (1981–), actress
- Maurice Pillard dit Verneuil, (1869–1942), Art Nouveau illustrator

== French sartorial heritage ==
The city was a pivotal centre of mulquinerie.

== Incidents ==
On 30 March 2013 five children between the ages of two and ten, were killed in a house fire in the city.

Their parents had recently separated and their father was hosting the children at his new home for the first time for the weekend, as they had been spending most of their time with their mother. At 10:30pm local time on Saturday 30 March the fire started via an unknown cause. The children's father, alongside neighbours, made desperate attempts to save the children, but by the time the emergency services arrived, it was too late. The building was considered "too dangerous to enter" and the bodies of the five children were discovered once the fire was extinguished.

The children's father was seriously burned in a failed attempt to save his children's lives and jumped through a window to safety. He was hospitalised and wasn't informed until later on Sunday that his children had died.

== Twin towns and sister cities ==
Saint-Quentin is twinned with:

- Kaiserslautern, Germany
- Rotherham, Yorkshire, England
- San Lorenzo de El Escorial, Spain
- Tongzhou (Beijing), China

== See also ==
- Battle of St. Quentin (disambiguation)
- Communes of the Aisne department
- Augusta Viromanduorum

== Gallery ==
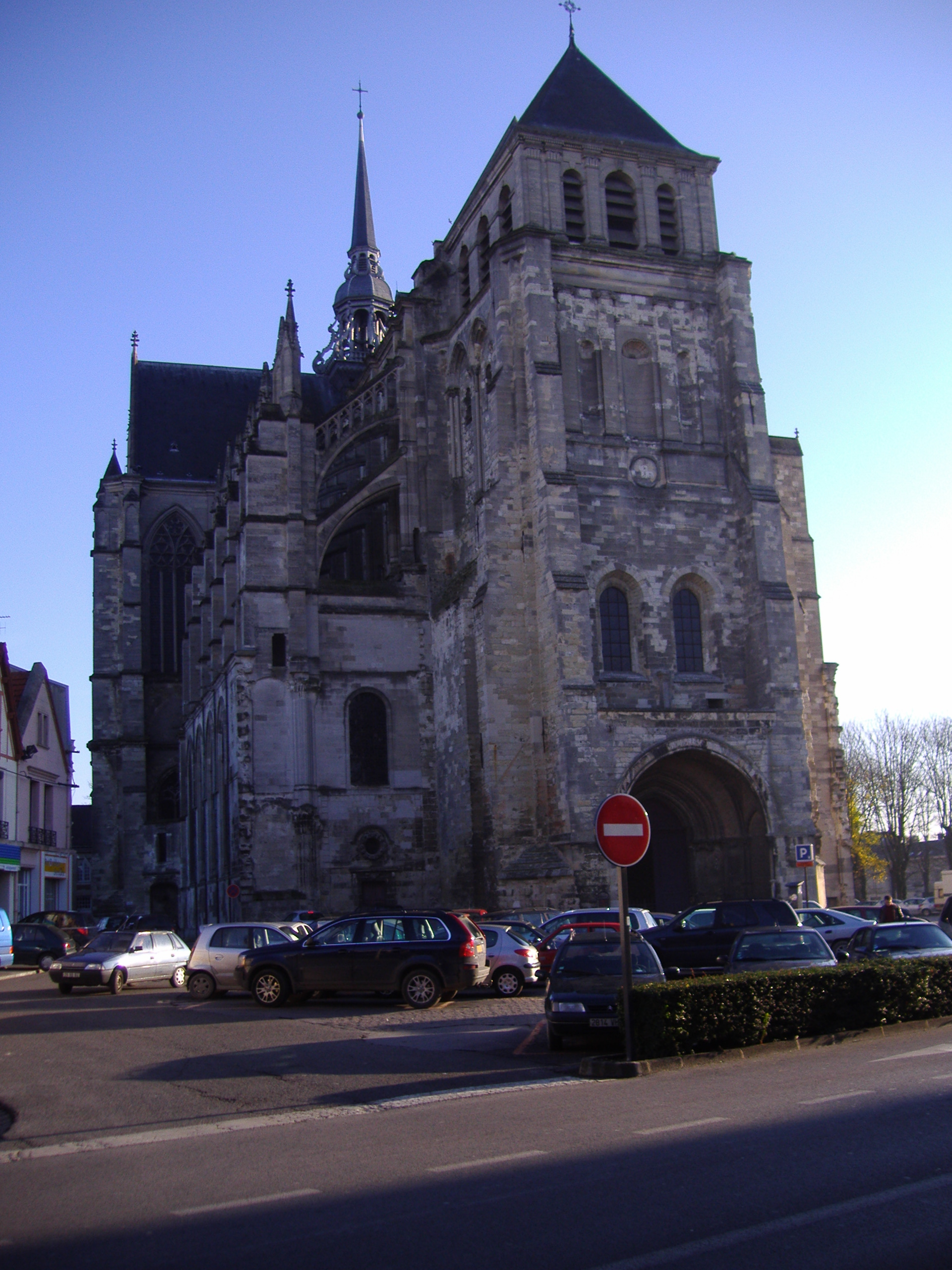
The Basilica

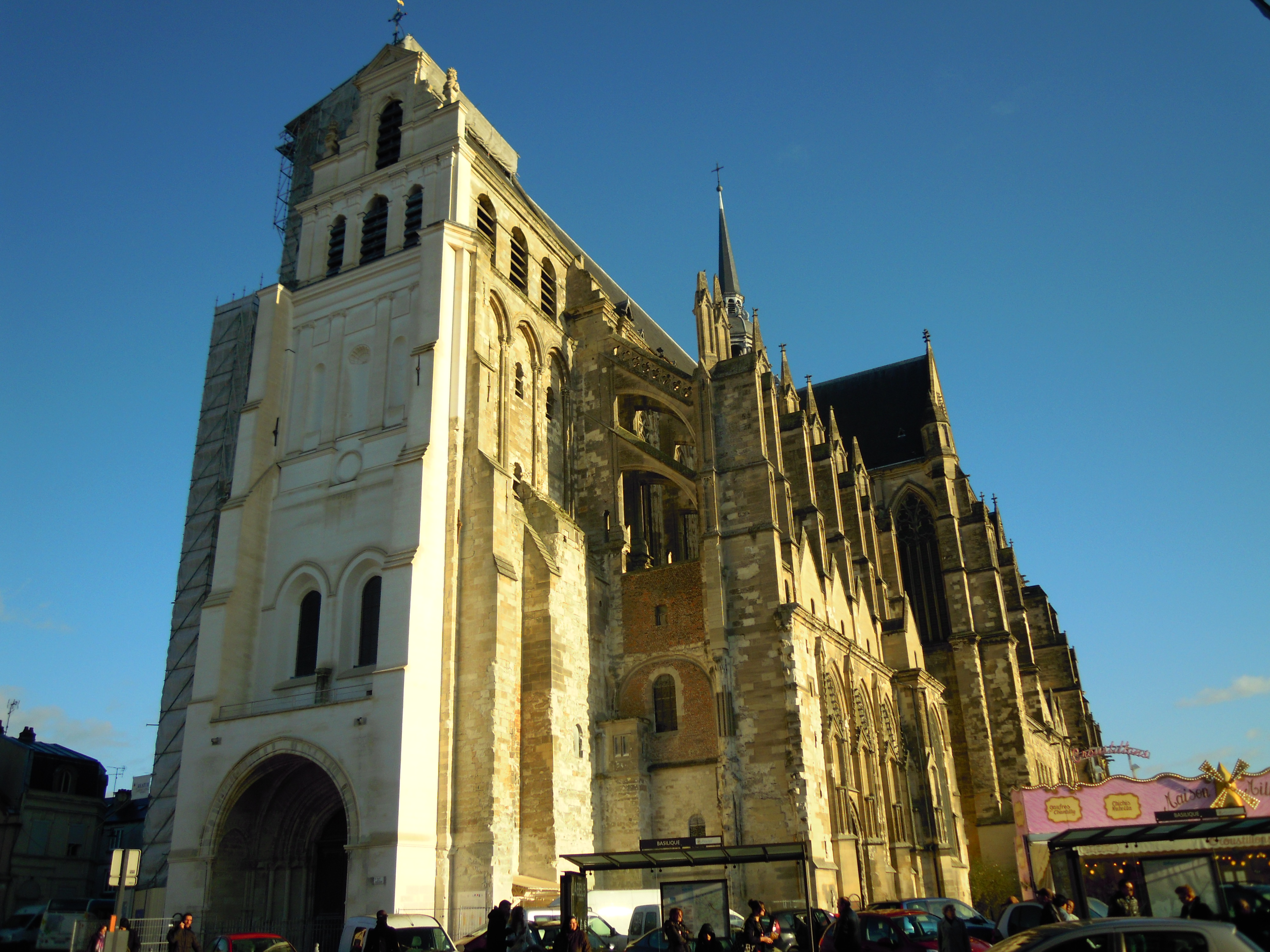
The Basilica with renovations to front entrance

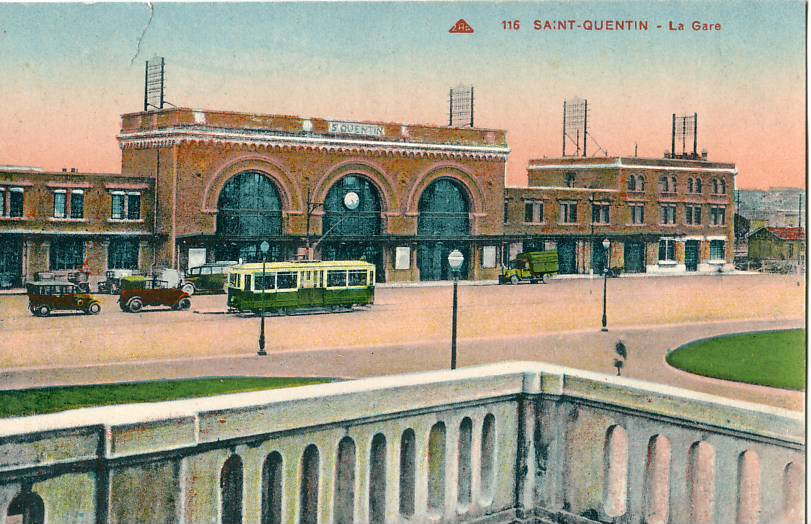
The Railway Station

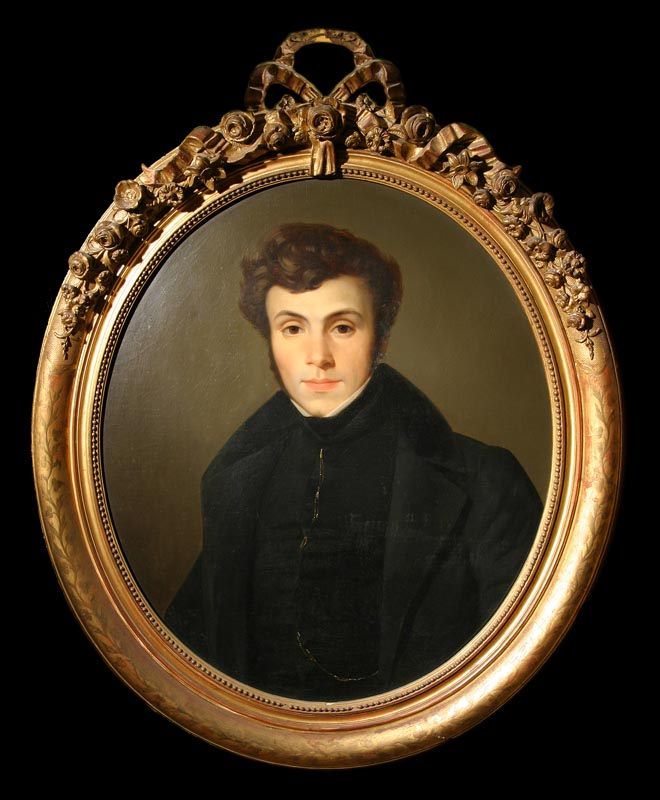
Félix Davin (1807–1836), poet and journalist

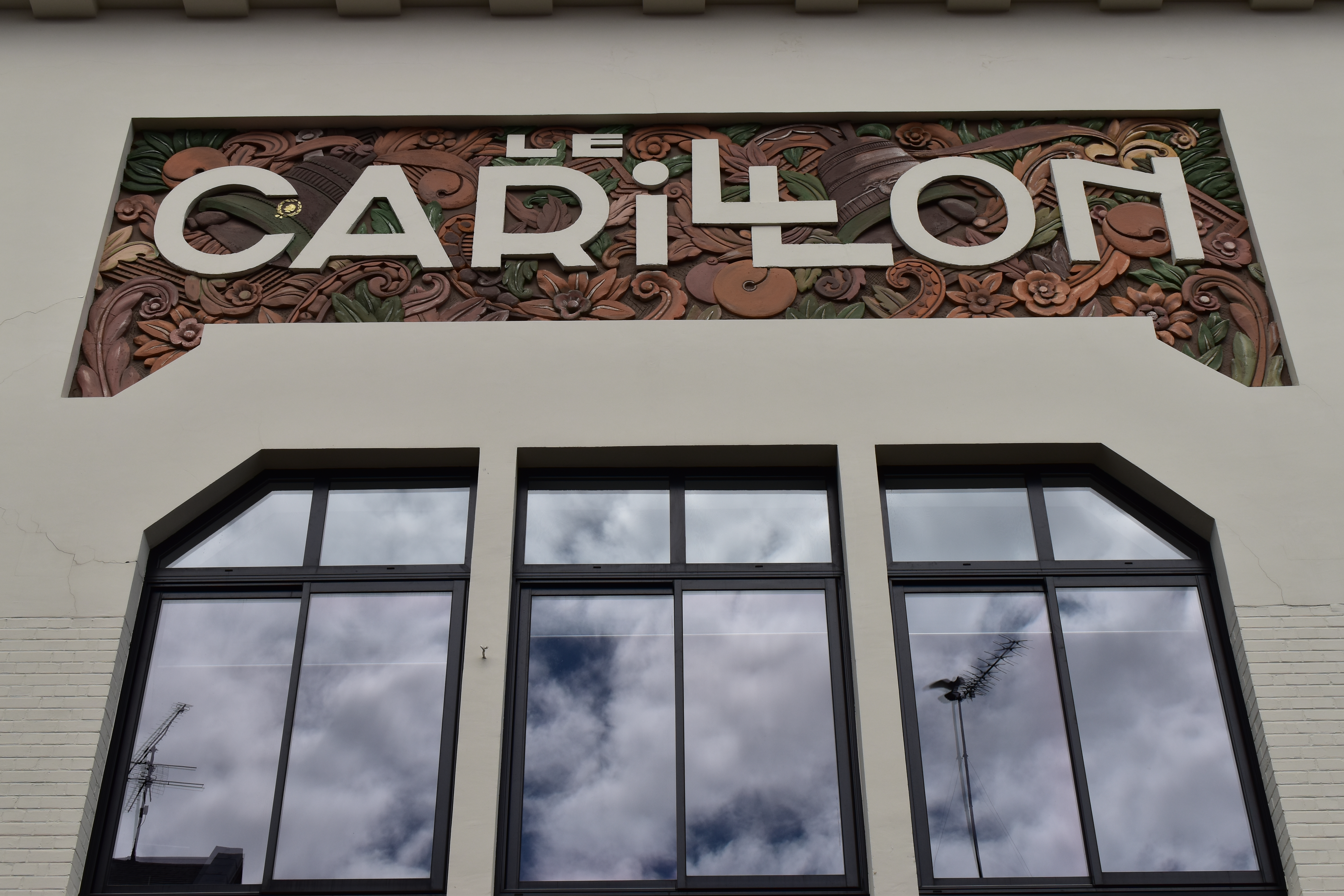
Facade of the old Carillon cinema
