= Alexandre Avez =

French politician

Alexandre Avez (16 June 1858, Saint-Quentin, Aisne - 12 January 1896) was a French politician. He belonged to the Revolutionary Socialist Workers' Party (POSR). He was a member of the Chamber of Representatives from 1893 to 1896.
