= Condren =

- Commune
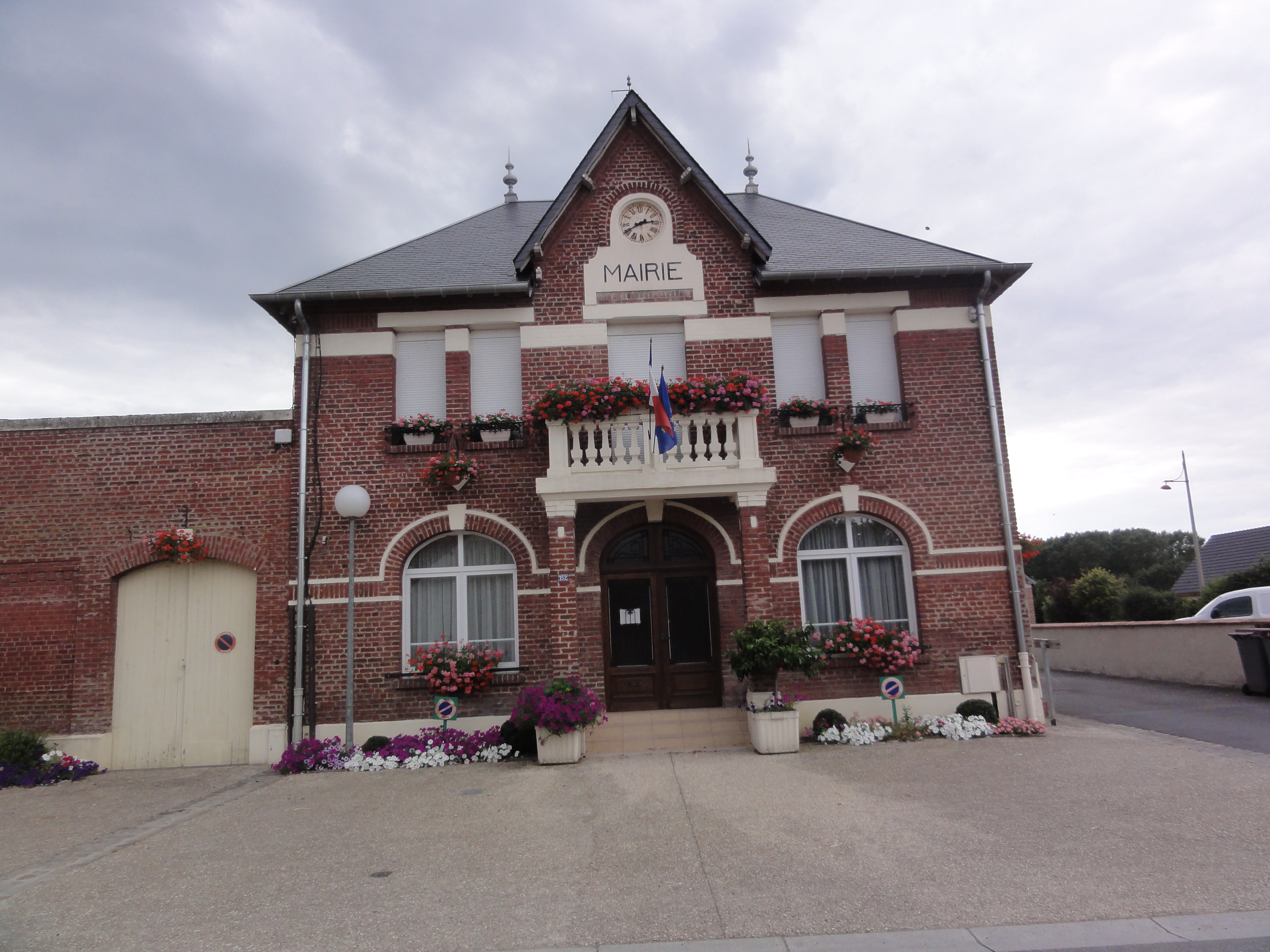
- The town hall of Condren

- Coat of arms
- Location of Condren
- Location within France Location within Hauts-de-France
- Coordinates: 49°37′55″N 3°16′54″E
- Country: France
- Region: Hauts-de-France
- Department: Aisne
- Arrondissement: Laon
- Canton: Chauny
- Intercommunality: CA Chauny Tergnier La Fère

Government
  - Mayor (2026–32): Claude Florin
- Area^{1}: 5.58 km^{2} (2.15 sq mi)
- Elevation: 51 m (167 ft)
- Highest elevation: 71 m (233 ft)
- Lowest elevation: 44 m (144 ft)
- Population (2023): 674
  - Density: 121/km^{2} (313/sq mi)
- Time zone: UTC+01:00 (CET)
  - Summer (DST): UTC+02:00 (CEST)
- INSEE/Postal code: 02212 /02700
- ^{1} French Land Register data, which excludes lakes, ponds, glaciers > 1 km^{2} (0.386 sq mi or 247 acres) and river estuaries.

Condren (French pronunciation: [kɔ̃dʁɑ̃]) is a commune in the Aisne department in Hauts-de-France in northern France.

== Population ==
Historical population
| Year | Pop. | ±% p.a. |
|---|---|---|
| 1968 | 566 | — |
| 1975 | 558 | −0.20% |
| 1982 | 732 | +3.95% |
| 1990 | 725 | −0.12% |
| 1999 | 686 | −0.61% |
| 2007 | 703 | +0.31% |
| 2012 | 709 | +0.17% |
| 2017 | 707 | −0.06% |
| 2023 | 674 | −0.79% |
Source: INSEE

== See also ==
- Communes of the Aisne department
