= Montagnac-la-Crempse =

- Commune
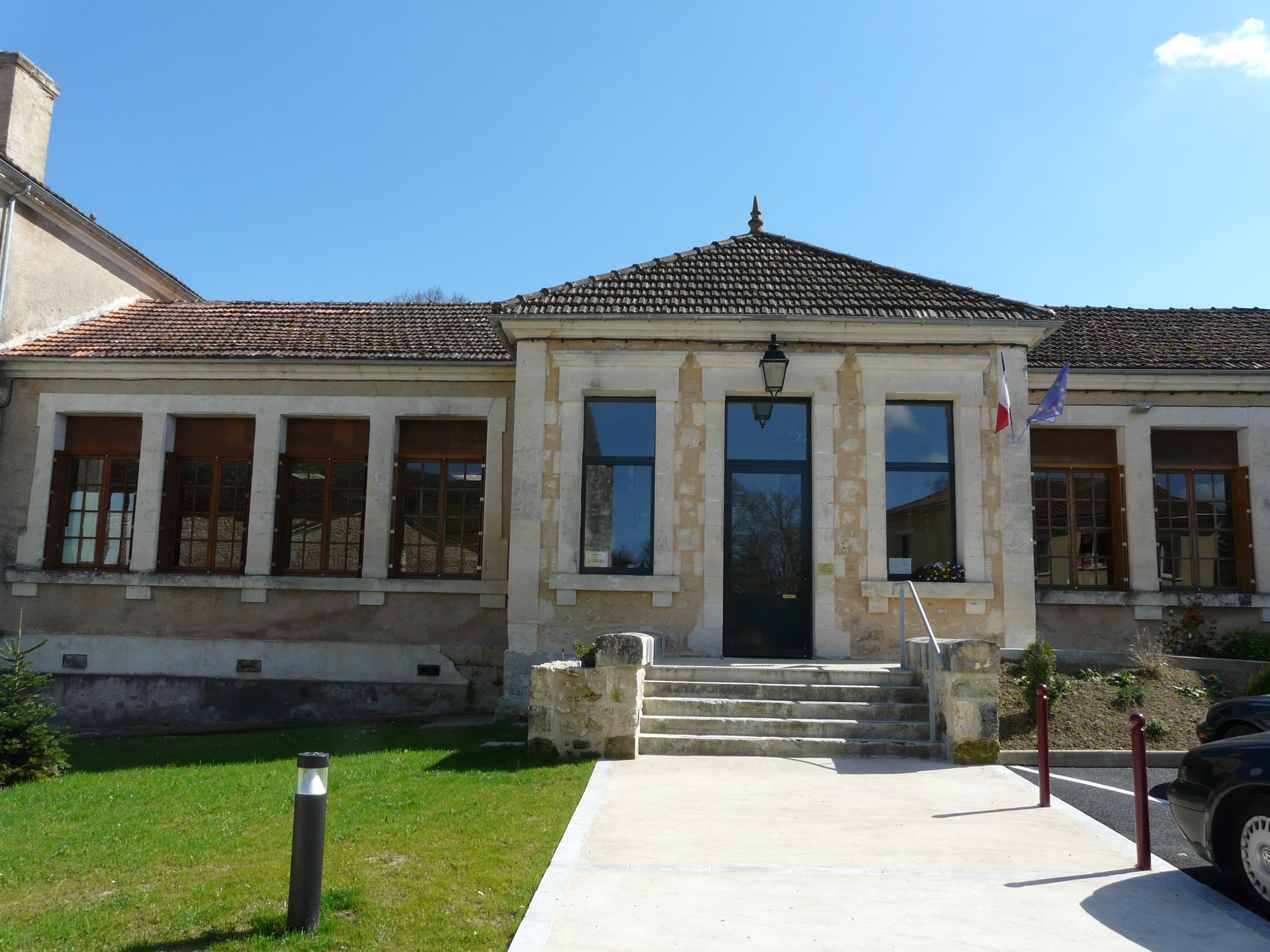
- The town hall in Montagnac-la-Crempse
- Location of Montagnac-la-Crempse
- Location within France Location within Nouvelle-Aquitaine
- Coordinates: 44°58′55″N 0°32′48″E
- Country: France
- Region: Nouvelle-Aquitaine
- Department: Dordogne
- Arrondissement: Périgueux
- Canton: Périgord Central

Government
  - Mayor (2020–2026): Jean-Claude Prevot
- Area^{1}: 25.49 km^{2} (9.84 sq mi)
- Elevation: 135 m (443 ft)
- Highest elevation: 199 m (653 ft)
- Lowest elevation: 92 m (302 ft)
- Population (2023): 378
  - Density: 14.8/km^{2} (38.4/sq mi)
- Time zone: UTC+01:00 (CET)
  - Summer (DST): UTC+02:00 (CEST)
- INSEE/Postal code: 24285 /24140
- ^{1} French Land Register data, which excludes lakes, ponds, glaciers > 1 km^{2} (0.386 sq mi or 247 acres) and river estuaries.

Montagnac-la-Crempse (French pronunciation: [mɔ̃taɲak la kʁɛ̃ps]; Occitan: Montanhac de Cremsa) is a commune in the Dordogne department in Nouvelle-Aquitaine in southwestern France.

== Population ==
Historical population
Year	Pop.	±% p.a.
1968	448	—
1975	409	−1.29%
1982	365	−1.61%
1990	363	−0.07%
1999	381	+0.54%
2007	385	+0.13%
2012	377	−0.42%
2017	392	+0.78%
2023	378	−0.60%
Source: INSEE

== See also ==
- Communes of the Dordogne department
