= Félix Davin =

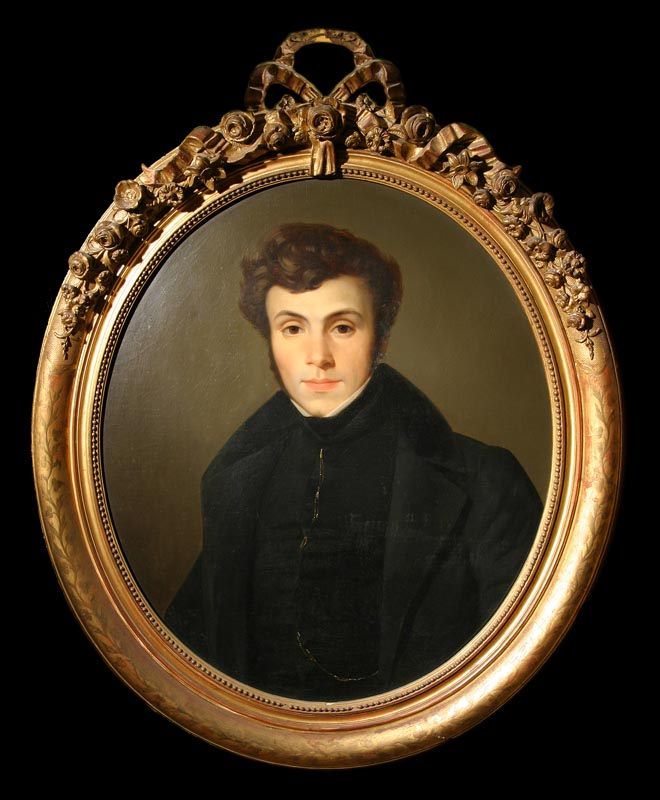
Félix Davin

Félix Davin was a 19th-century French journalist, novelist and poet.

Félix Davin was born on 24 April 1807 in Saint-Quentin, Aisne where he died on 3 August 1836.

He was educated at a boarding school in Paris, then at the Collège de Saint-Quentin. He became well known in the town after he entered a competition of the Academy of the city, and won the first prize. While the poem by his childhood friend, the future historian Henri Martin, got an honourable mention. The two friends then wrote Tower of the Wolf, a novel written in the tormented style of the period.

After school he moved to Paris, where he worked for le Figaro, alongside Léon Gozlan, Auguste Jal, Jules Janin, Alphonse Karr, Nestor Roqueplan, George Sand, Jules Sandeau. He also contributed to several journals such as the Journal des Demoiselles and The Museum of Families, and later founded the Journal Le Guetteur in Saint-Quentin.

After getting "a beautiful success of goosebumps" with a Spanish novel titled The Toad, he published a series of five novels from 1833 which he named "intimate novels", in which made observations on the provincial customs. In 1834 and 1835, he signed for Honoré de Balzac, of which he was a great admirer. His last two publications are A Natural Daughter, a historical novel after the manner of Walter Scott, and Mysteries and Fantasies, a collection of poems.

He caught tuberculosis, and returned to his home town, Saint-Quentin, Aisne, where he died at the age of 29. A street there now bears his name.

== List of Publications ==
- Poems san-quintinoises (1828)
- "Las Casas", poem in three periods (1830)
- Wolfthurm, or the Tour du loup, Tyrolean stories (2 vols., 1830)
- The Toad, Spanish novel, 1823 (2 vols., 1832)
- A Seduction, novel (1833)
- The Two Parallel Lines, (1833)
- Morals in the North of the France. That regret women (2 vols., 1834)
- Morals in the North of the France. A story about a suicide (2 vols., 1835)
- Morals in the North of the France. The House of the Angel, or the evil of the century (2 vols., 1835)
- A Natural Daughter, reign of Henri II, 1556-1557 (2 vols., 1836)
- Mysteries and Fantasies (1836)
