= Celtic onomastics =

Study of Celtic proper names

Onomastics is an important source of information on the early Celts, as Greco-Roman historiography recorded Celtic names before substantial written information becomes available in any Celtic language.

Like Germanic names, early Celtic names are often dithematic.

== Suffixes ==
- suffix -rix "ruler"
  - Ambiorix
  - Boiorix
  - Cingetorix
  - Dumnorix
  - Orgetorix
  - Vercingetorix
- suffix -maris / -marus "great"
  - Britomaris
  - Indutiomarus
  - Viridomarus

== Celtic polytheism ==
Some information on prehistoric Celtic polytheism can be drawn from names in Irish and Welsh mythology, which often continue older theonyms:

- Gwenhwyfar, from *Uindā Seibrā "White Phantom"
- Brigid, from *Brigantia "the High one"
- Lugh and Lleu, cognate with Gaulish Lugus

== Surnames ==
Many surnames of Gaelic origin in Ireland and the other Celtic nations derive from ancestors' names, nicknames, or descriptive names. In the first group can be placed surnames such as MacMurrough and MacCarthy, derived from patronymics, or O'Brien and O'Grady, derived from ancestral names.

Gaelic surnames derived from nicknames include Ó Dubhda (from Aedh ua Dubhda—Aedh, 'the dark one'), O'Doherty (from Ó Dochartaigh, 'destroyer' or 'obtrusive'), Garvery (garbh, 'rough' or 'nasty'), Manton (mantach, 'toothless'), Bane (bán, 'white', as in 'white hair'), Finn (fionn, 'fair', as in 'fair hair') and Kennedy (ceann éidigh, 'ugly head')

Very few Gaelic surnames are derived from placenames or from venerated people or objects. Among those that are included in this small group, several can be shown to be derivations of Gaelic personal names or surnames. One notable exception is Ó Cuilleáin or O'Collins (from cuileann, 'holly') as in the holly tree, considered one of the most sacred objects of pre-Christian Celtic culture. Another is Walsh (Irish: Breatnach), meaning Welsh.

In areas where certain family names are extremely common, extra names are added that sometimes follow this archaic pattern. In Ireland, for example, where Murphy is an exceedingly common name, particular Murphy families or extended families are nicknamed, so that Denis Murphy's family were called 'The Weavers" and Denis himself was called "Denis 'The Weaver' Murphy". (See also O'Hay.)

For much the same reason, nicknames (e.g. "the Fada Burkes", "the long/tall Burkes"), father's names (e.g. "John Morrissey Ned") or mother's maiden name ("Kennedy" becoming "Kennedy-Lydon") can become colloquial or legal surnames. The Irish family of de Courcy descends from Anglo-Normans who came to Ireland following the Norman Conquest; the name is of French derivation, and indicates that the family once held a manor of that name in Normandy. The de Courcy family was prominent in County Cork from the earliest days of the Norman occupation and subsequently became prominent in Ireland.

In addition to all this, Irish-speaking areas still follow the old tradition of naming themselves after their father, grandfather, great-grandfather and so on. Examples include Mike Bartly Pat Reilly ('Mike, son of Bartholomew, son of Pat Reilly'), Seán Mícheál Seán Óg Pádraic Breathnach ('John, son of Michael, son of young John, son of Pat Breathnach'), Tom Paddy-Joe Seoige ('Tom, son of Paddy-Joe Seoige'), and Mary Bartly Mike Walsh ('Mary, daughter of Bartly, son of Mike Walsh'). Sometimes, the female line of the family is used, depending on how well the parent is known in the area the person resides in, e.g. Paddy Mary John ("Paddy, son of Mary, daughter of John"). A similar tradition continues even in English-speaking areas, especially in rural districts.

=== Surname prefixes ===
- Bean: 'wife', pronounced [bʲanˠ].
- De: 'of the': a Norman-French habitational prefix used by some of the most common Irish surnames among which are De Búrca, De Brún, De Barra, De Cíosóg, Devane and de Faoite. De historically has signaled ownership of lands and was traditionally therefore a mark of prestige.
- Mac (in English also written Mc, M^{c}, M', and Mic): for most purposes, taken to mean 'son of', as in Mac Néill, 'son of Neil'. However, literally, the 'of' part does not come from the Mac prefix but from the patronymic that follows it; e.g., in the case of Mac Néill, Mac merely means 'son'; Néill (meaning 'of Neil') is the genitive form of Niall ('Neil'). In some cases, if the second word (nominal element) begins with a vowel, Mac then becomes Mag, as in Mag Eocháin.
- Mhic: [vʲɪc]. Compressed form of bean mhic ('wife of the son of') e.g. Máire Mhic Néill (Máire, the wife of Mac Néill). This is the grammatically correct form of the prefix Mac always taken by a woman after marriage (e.g. a woman marrying someone of the surname Mac Néill would become Mhic Néill). Mhig (also pronounced [vʲɪc]) is used similarly to Mag in some cases (e.g. Mag Shamhráin / Mhig Shamhráin).
- Maol: In Pagan times this was expressed as Mug, as in the case of Mug Nuadat. The literal expression of this is "slave of Nuada", i.e. "devotee of Nuada". In the Christian era the word Mael was used in its place for given names such as Mael Bridget, Mael Padraig, Mael Lagan, Mael Sechlainn, and Mael Martain. In later times, some of these given names evolved into surnames, e.g. Ó Máel Sechlainn and Mac Mael Martain or Mael Lagan, which became after the 15th century the name Milligan.
- Fitz: a Norman-French word derived from the Latin word filius ('son'). It was used in patronymics by thousands of men in the early Norman period in Ireland (e.g. fitz Stephen, fitz Richard, fitz Robert, fitz William) and only on some occasions did it become used as an actual surname, the most famous example being the FitzGerald Earls of Kildare. Yet well into the 17th and 18th century it was used in certain areas dominated by the Hiberno-Normans of Ireland in its original form, as a patronymic. The Tribes of Galway were especially good at conserving this form, with examples such as John fitz John Bodkin and Michael Lynch fitz Arthur, used even as late as the early 19th century. A number of illegitimate descendants of the British royal family were given surnames with this element: some of the illegitimate children of King Charles II were named FitzCharles or FitzRoy ("son of the King"); those of King James II were named FitzJames; those of Prince William, Duke of Clarence and St Andrews (later King William IV) were named FitzClarence. Note that Fitzpatrick is not Norman: it is actually a Normanisation of the Gaelic surname Mac Ghiolla Phádraig.
- Ó: In Old Irish as ua ('grandson', 'descendant'). E.g., the ancestor of the O'Brien clan, Brian Boru (937–1014) was known in his lifetime as Brian mac Cennéide mac Lorcán ('Brian, the son of Cennéide, the son of Lorcán'). Not until the time of his grandsons and great-grandsons was the name O'Brien used as a surname, used to denote descent from an illustrious ancestor. It has for some three hundred years been written as O', but in recent years the apostrophe is often dropped, bringing it into line with early medieval forms. The apostrophe came into existence as an error by the English, when in the process of anglicizing the surnames in Ireland, the accent above the O was mistakenly recognized as an apostrophe; it is sometimes popularly thought to be an abbreviation of of.
- Uí: This is the plural of Ó and is used in reference to a kin-group or clan, e.g. Uí Néill, in reference to the O'Neill clan. It is pronounced [i].
- Ní: This is used for women instead of Ó before a surname (e.g. Máire Ní Bhriain, "Mary O'Brien"), and comes from a shortened form of iníon, the Irish word for a daughter.
- Nic: This is used for women instead of Mac, but only if this is their maiden name, never their married name. Compressed form of iníon mhic ('daughter of the son of/Mac...'), e.g. Máire Nic Charthaigh ('Mary, daughter of McCarthy'). Nig [nʲɪc] is used in cases where the surname uses Mag e.g. Nig Shamhráin.

== See also ==
- Celtic toponymy
- Irish name
- Place names in Ireland
- Germanic name
- Scottish Gaelic name
- Scottish toponymy
- Welsh surnames
- Welsh toponymy
