= Tituria gens =

Ancient Roman family

The gens Tituria was an obscure plebeian family at ancient Rome. Few members of this gens appear in history, of whom the most famous is Quintus Titurius Sabinus, one of Caesar's legates during the Gallic Wars. Other Titurii are known from inscriptions.

== Origin ==
The nomen Titurius is listed by Chase among those gentilicia that either originated at Rome, or cannot be shown to have come from anywhere else. The surname Sabinus, borne by several members of this family, suggests that they considered themselves the descendants of the Sabines, an ancient people of central Italy, many of whom were said to have settled at Rome beginning in the time of Romulus.

== Praenomina ==
The main praenomina of the Titurii were Lucius and Gaius, the two most common names at all periods of Roman history. Other praenomina occurring in this gens include Titus, Quintus, Marcus, and Decimus, of which only Decimus was relatively distinctive. The filiation of one early member of this family indicates that they also used the praenomen Vibius, which was decidedly uncommon at Rome.

== Members ==
This list includes abbreviated praenomina. For an explanation of this practice, see filiation.

- Lucius Titurius L. f. Sabinus, one of the triumviri monetales at some point between about 89 and 84 BC. He might be the same person as the legate who brought fifteen cohorts of Pompeius to their winter quarters in Celtiberia in 75 BC.
- Quintus Titurius Sabinus, one of Caesar's legates during the Gallic Wars. He put down an uprising in 56 BC, but two years later was slain by Ambiorix, along with Lucius Aurunculeius Cotta.
- Tituria Zosima, buried at Brundisium in Calabria, aged forty-five, at some point between 20 BC and AD 30.
- Tituria Ɔ. l. Synetia, a freedwoman buried at Rome early in the first century, along with the freedwoman Tituria Xyne and the freedman Quintus Caesius Artemo.
- Tituria Ɔ. l. Xyne, a freedwoman buried at Rome early in the first century, along with the freedwoman Tituria Synetia and the freedman Quintus Caesius Artemo.
- Lucius Titurius V. f. Sabinus, named along with the freedwoman Cornelia Chila in a sepulchral inscription from Rome, dating from the first half of the first century.
- Gaius Titurius Festus, a centurion in the fourteenth cohort of the praetorian guard at Iuvavum in Noricum in AD 69.
- Gaius Titurius C. l. Felix, a freedman, built a tomb at Casinum in Latium, dating between the beginning of the first century and the middle of the second, for the freedwoman Decitia Fortunata, and his former master, Gaius Titurius Sabinus.
- Gaius Titurius C. f. Sabinus, buried at Casinum, in a tomb built by his freedman, Gaius Titurius Felix, dating between the beginning of the first century and the middle of the second.
- Tituria Ɔ. l. Chrysis, a freedwoman, donated one pound, ten ounces of silver to Venus at Sentinum in Umbria, at some point between the middle of the first century and the end of the second.
- Titus Titurius, named in an inscription from Vercellae in Gallia Narbonensis, dating between the late first century and the middle of the second.
- Lucius Titurius Sabinus, dedicated a monument at Rome, dating from the first half of the second century, for the family of Marcus Valerius Dius.
- Marcus Titurius C. f., a soldier in the third cohort of the Legio II Traiana Fortis, dedicated a sepulchre at Alexandria, dating from between AD 120 and 150, for himself and his wife.
- Gaius Titurius Valens, a native of Patavium in Venetia and Histria, was a soldier in the century of Proculus, in the sixth cohort of the praetorian guard, stationed at Rome between AD 135 and 137.
- Lucius Titurius Maxurius, one of the magistri fontis at Rome in AD 140.
- Gaius Titurius Secundus, a native of Vercellae, was a soldier in the century of Proclus, in the fourteenth urban cohort. He was buried in a second-century tomb at Rome, having served for seventeen years, with a monument from his brother.
- Titurius Proculus, a centurion in the Legio XXII Primigenia, during the government of Marcus Bassaeus Astur in Arabia Petraea, toward the end of the second century.
- Tituria Veneria, buried at Cirta in Numidia in the late second or early third century.
- Titurius [...]ulanus, named in a fourth-century sepulchral inscription from the site of modern Ferentillo in Umbria.
- Tituria Rufina, buried at Albulae in Mauretania Caesariensis, aged about twenty-three, on the fourth day before the Nones of October (Note: October 4, by modern reckoning.) in AD 499 or 500.

=== Undated Titurii ===
- Titurius, a potter whose maker's mark was found at Aquileia in Venetia and Histria.
- Titurius, a potter whose maker's mark has been found on pottery from various sites in Gallia Belgica.
- Titurius, a potter whose maker's mark has been found on pottery from Britannia.
- Lucius Titurius, a potter whose maker's mark was found on potter from Latium or Campania.
- Titurius Festus, buried at Madaurus in Africa Proconsularis, aged forty, along with a younger man named Lucius Titurius Festus, and Titurius Maurus.
- Lucius Titurius Festus, Madaurus, aged twenty-one, along with an older Titurius Festus, and Titurius Maurus.
- Titus Titurius T. f. Mamercus, named in a sepulchral inscription from Rome, along with Titus Titurius Sabinus and Tituria Sabina.
- Titurius Maurus, buried at Madaurus, along with Titurius Festus, and a younger man named Lucius Titurius Festus.
- Tituria Sabina, named in a sepulchral inscription from Rome, along with Titus Titurius Mamercus and Titus Titurius Sabinus.
- Titurius Sabinus, a potter whose maker's mark was found on pottery from an uncertain province.
- Titus Titurius T. f. Sabinus, named in a sepulchral inscription from Rome, along with Titus Titurius Mamercus and Tituria Sabina.
- Quintus Titurius Saturninus, buried at Mactaris in Africa Proconsularis, aged eighty-five, with a monument from one of his children.
- Decimus Titurius Secundus, named in an inscription from Concordia in Venetia and Histria.
- Tituria Ser[...], a girl buried at Carmo in Hispania Baetica, aged ten.
- Lucius Titurius C. f. Sura, buried at Ateste in Venetia and Histria, with a monument from the freedwoman Acutia Auga.
- Tituria Tuenda, dedicated a tomb at Aquileia for the freedman Quintus Cervius Treptus and Quintus Cervius Pudens.

== See also ==
- List of Roman gentes

== Bibliography ==
- Gaius Julius Caesar, Commentarii de Bello Gallico (Commentaries on the Gallic War).
- Gaius Sallustius Crispus (Sallust), Historiae (The Histories).
- Dionysius of Halicarnassus, Romaike Archaiologia (Roman Antiquities).
- Titus Livius (Livy), History of Rome.
- Gaius Suetonius Tranquillus, De Vita Caesarum (Lives of the Caesars, or The Twelve Caesars).
- Lucius Annaeus Florus, Epitome de T. Livio Bellorum Omnium Annorum DCC (Epitome of Livy: All the Wars of Seven Hundred Years).
- Lucius Cassius Dio, Roman History.
- Eutropius, Breviarium Historiae Romanae (Abridgement of the History of Rome).
- Paulus Orosius, Historiarum Adversum Paganos (History Against the Pagans).
- Dictionary of Greek and Roman Biography and Mythology, William Smith, ed., Little, Brown and Company, Boston (1849).
- Theodor Mommsen et alii, Corpus Inscriptionum Latinarum (The Body of Latin Inscriptions, abbreviated CIL), Berlin-Brandenburgische Akademie der Wissenschaften (1853–present).
- Ettore Pais, Corporis Inscriptionum Latinarum Supplementa Italica (Italian Supplement to the Corpus Inscriptionum Latinarum), Rome (1884).
- René Cagnat et alii, L'Année épigraphique (The Year in Epigraphy, abbreviated AE), Presses Universitaires de France (1888–present).
- George Davis Chase, "The Origin of Roman Praenomina", in Harvard Studies in Classical Philology, vol. VIII, pp. 103–184 (1897).
- Paul von Rohden, Elimar Klebs, & Hermann Dessau, Prosopographia Imperii Romani (The Prosopography of the Roman Empire, abbreviated PIR), Berlin (1898).
- Stéphane Gsell, Inscriptions Latines de L'Algérie (Latin Inscriptions from Algeria), Edouard Champion, Paris (1922–present).
- Inscriptions Grecques et Latines de la Syrie (Greek and Latin Inscriptions of Syria), Paris (1929–present).
- La Carte Archéologique de la Gaule (Archaeological Map of Gaul, abbreviated CAG), Académie des Inscriptions et Belles-Lettres (1931–present).
- T. Robert S. Broughton, The Magistrates of the Roman Republic, American Philological Association (1952–1986).
- Hispania Epigraphica (Epigraphy of Spain), Madrid (1989–present).
