= Cingetorix (Gaul) =

Gallic king who led the Treveri during the Gallic Wars

King of the Treveri (disputed)
- 1st reign: Spring 54 BC – Winter 54 BC
- 2nd reign: 53 BC – Unknown
- Contender: Indutiomarus
- Born: c. 1st century BC; Gaul

Cingetorix was a Gallic aristocrat who served as king of the Treveri (a people who resided around present-day Trier) during Julius Caesar's conquest of Gaul (58–50 BC).

In 54 BC, Cingetorix competed with his father-in-law, the anti-Roman Indutiomarus, for rulership of the Treveri. Due to Caesar's intervention, Cingetorix succeeded and became king but in the winter later that year, Indutiomarus instigated a revolt and forced him into exile. Cingetorix informed Caesar's legate Titus Labienus who then defeated and killed Indutiomarus in a cavalry engagement though resistance continued. In 53 BC, the revolt was finally crushed and Cingetorix was restored to power.

== Etymology ==
In the Gaulish language, the name Cingetorix means 'king of warriors' or perhaps 'marching king'. It is a compound of the root cingeto- ('warrior, hero') and the suffix -rix ('king'). The root cingeto- is itself derived from the verb *cinge- possibly meaning 'to go, to advance'. Both words appear in a similar form in the name Vercingetorix. The name is also attested among the Britons in the name of the Cantiacan king Cingetorix.

== Biography ==
=== Background ===
Cingetorix belonged to the Treveri, a Celto–Germanic people who were part of the Belgic confederation and resided along the Moselle river, near the present-day city of Trier, in the 1st century BC. By the mid-first century BC, the Treveri had developed an oligarchic system of government wherein a council of aristocrats ruled and would appoint political leaders. Cingetorix belonged to the noble class and at some point married the daughter of Indutiomarus, another influential noble who would later be his rival.

=== Rivalry with Indutiomarus ===
In 58 BC, Julius Caesar would begin the Roman conquest of Gaul and the Treveri were initially allies of the Romans, sending cavalry to serve as auxiliaries during his conquest among the Belgae in 57 BC. Opposition to the Romans grew, however, and pro-Roman and anti-Roman factions had coalesced by 54 BC. Cingetorix led the pro-Roman faction, encouraging further cooperation with Rome while Indutiomarus led the anti-Roman faction, urging war with the Romans while already making his own preparations.

Shortly before Caesar departed on his second invasion of Britain in early 54 BC, the two became locked in a bitter struggle for power over the state that only ended when Caesar marched personally to the Treveri territory and many of Indutiomarus's supporters deserted him for Cingetorix whose power was secured.

=== Belgic Revolt ===
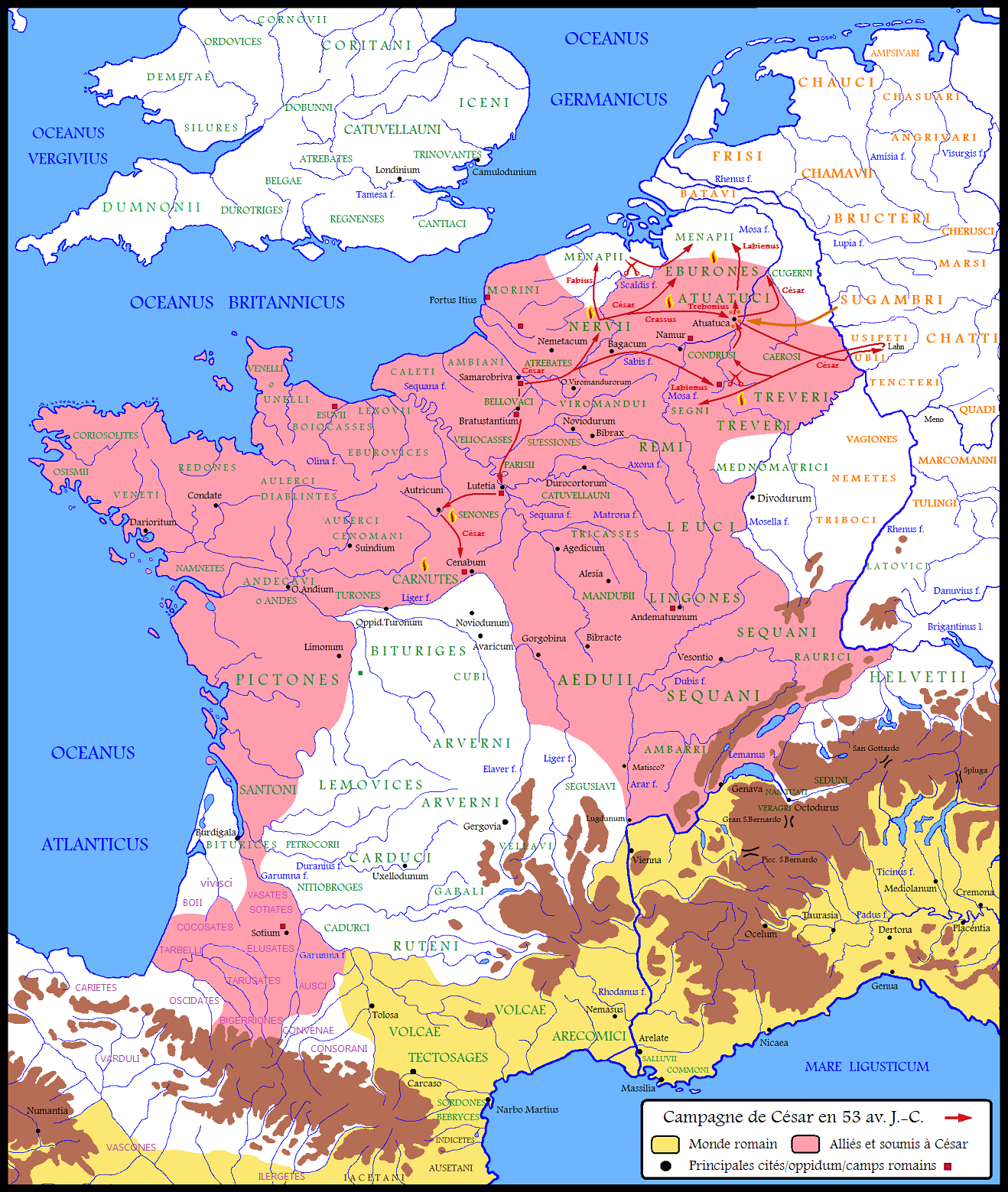
Campaign map of 53 BC. Revolting tribes are shown with flame icons. Note Labienus's campaign against the Treveri.

Though temporarily sidelined, Indutiomarus continued to plot against the Romans and over the winter of 54–53 BC, he colluded with Ambiorix and Cativolcus of the Eburones to revolt, triggering Ambiorix's revolt, while assembling his own force and making overtures to the Germanic tribes across the Rhine to join. After calling for an armed convention in the Treveran territory, Indutiomarus seized power, exiled Cingetorix and his family, and seized his property before embarking on a campaign against the Roman legate Titus Labienus who encamped in the lands of the Remi. Cingetorix and his kin traveled to Labienus' camp ahead of them and warned him, allowing him to assemble cavalry from the neighboring territories. In the ensuing battle, Indutiomarus was killed.

Even after Indutiomarus's death, members of his family continued to lead the Treveri in revolt as part of their alliance with Ambiorix. In the spring of 53 BC, Labienus would lead an offensive that successfully drove them from Treveran territory, after which they fled across the Rhine. After securing the allegiance of the Treveran state, Cingetorix was re-stated as king. He is not mentioned again in any subsequent writings.

== See also ==
- Vercingetorix

== Bibliography ==
- Julius Caesar, De Bello Gallico 5:3-4, 6:8
- Metzler, Jeannot (2003). "Le Luxembourg avant le Luxembourg". In Gilbert Trausch (ed.). Histoire du Luxembourg : Le destin européen d'un " petit pays " (in French). Toulouse: Éditions Privat. ISBN 2-7089-4773-7.
  - Delamarre, Xavier (2003). Dictionnaire de la langue gauloise. Errance. ISBN 9782877723695. OCLC 236333533.
