= Aurunculeia gens =

Ancient Roman plebeian family

The gens Aurunculeia was a plebeian family at Rome. None of the members of this gens ever obtained the consulship; the first who obtained the praetorship was Gaius Aurunculeius, in 209 BC.

== Origin ==
The nomen Aurunculeius is probably derived from the name of the Aurunci, a race of people from rural Campania, conquered by the Romans in 314 BC, during the Second Samnite War. The Aurunculei may have been of Auruncan origin, or perhaps less probably, descendants of the colonists sent to the towns of the Aurunci beginning in 313.

== Branches and cognomina ==
The only cognomen associated with the Aurunculeii is Cotta.

== Members ==
- Gaius Aurunculeius, praetor in 209 BC, during the Second Punic War, had the province of Sardinia.
- Gaius Aurunculeius, tribunus militum for the third legion in 207 BC.
- Lucius Aurunculeius, praetor urbanus in 190 BC, and one of ten commissioners sent to arrange the affairs of Asia at the conclusion of the war with Antiochus the Great, in 188.
- Gaius Aurunculeius, one of three ambassadors sent into Asia in 155 BC, to prevent Prusias II of Bithynia from making war upon Attalus.
- Lucius Aurunculeius Cotta, one of Caesar's legates in Gaul, slain in battle with Ambiorix in 54 BC.

== See also ==
- List of Roman gentes
