= Gaius Aurunculeius (praetor 209 BC) =

Ancient Roman nobleman of the 3rd century BCE

Gaius Aurunculeius was a nobleman of ancient Rome, of the Aurunculeia gens. He served as praetor in 209 BC, during the Second Punic War, and had the Roman province of Sardinia as his command. He was assigned the legions of Publius Manlius Vulso. He was also given 50 warships that Scipio Africanus had brought from Hispania.
