= Carentan =

Commune in Manche, France

- Delegated commune of Carentan-les-Marais
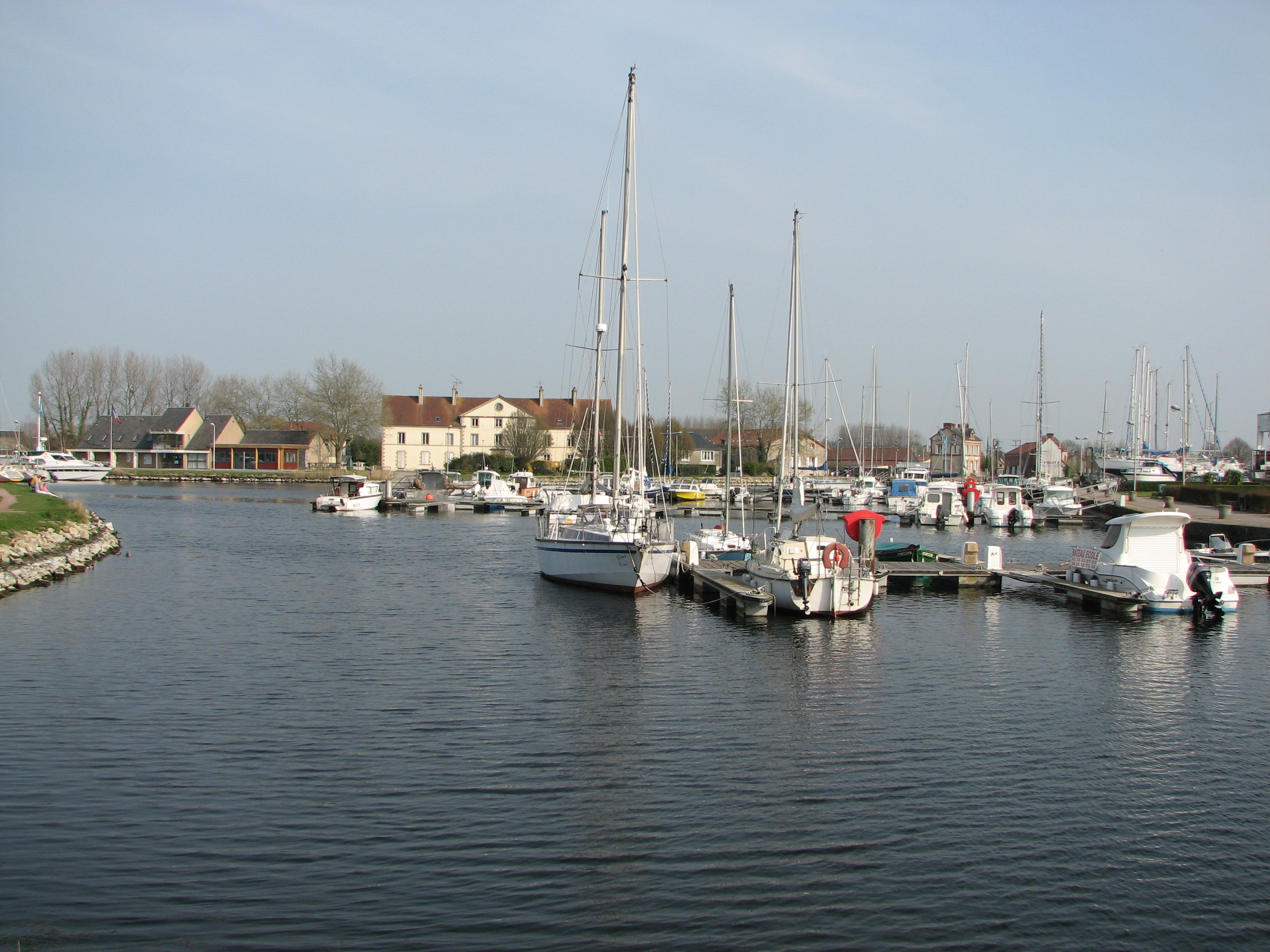
- Port

- Flag Coat of arms
- Location of Carentan
- Location within France Location within Normandy
- Coordinates: 49°18′N 1°15′W
- Country: France
- Region: Normandy
- Department: Manche
- Arrondissement: Saint-Lô
- Canton: Carentan
- Commune: Carentan-les-Marais
- Area^{1}: 15.66 km^{2} (6.05 sq mi)
- Elevation: 6 m (20 ft)
- Highest elevation: 30 m (98 ft)
- Lowest elevation: 0 m (0 ft)
- Population (2022): 6,024
  - Density: 384.7/km^{2} (996.3/sq mi)
- Time zone: UTC+01:00 (CET)
  - Summer (DST): UTC+02:00 (CEST)
- Postal code: 50500
- ^{1} French Land Register data, which excludes lakes, ponds, glaciers > 1 km^{2} (0.386 sq mi or 247 acres) and river estuaries.

Carentan (French pronunciation: [kaʁɑ̃tɑ̃]) is a small rural town near the north-eastern base of the French Cotentin Peninsula in Normandy in north-western France, with a population of about 6,000. It is a former commune in the Manche department. On 1 January 2016, it was merged into the new commune of Carentan-les-Marais. The town was a strategic early goal of the World War II landings as capturing the town was necessary to link the lodgements at Utah Beach and Omaha Beach which were divided by the Douve river estuary (nearby fields were flooded by the Germans up to the town's outskirts). The town was also needed as an intermediate staging position for the capture of the cities of Cherbourg and Octeville, with the critically important port facilities in Cherbourg.

== History ==
Carentan is close to the site of the medieval Battle of Formigny, fought in 1450 during the Hundred Years' War. The town is also likely the site of the historical references to the ancient Gallic port of Crociatonum (documented by Roman sources), a possession of the Unelli (or Veneli or also Venelli) tribe (Greek: Οὐένελοι) situated on the river Douve slightly inland from the beaches at Normandy. The gently sloping terrain in the nearby river valley was favorable for boat construction.

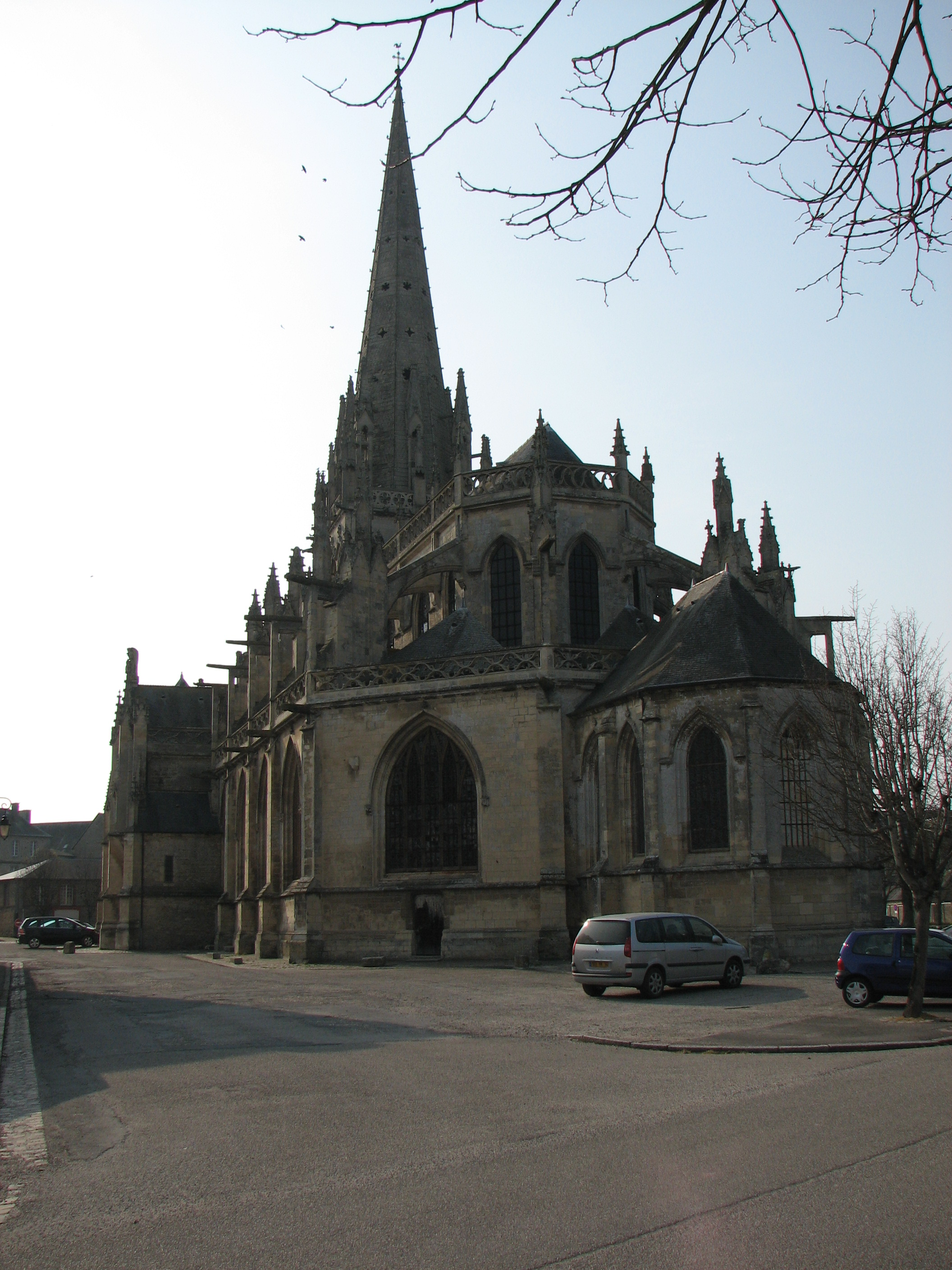
Carentan church

=== World War II ===
In the early hours of June 6, 1944, the U.S. 82nd Airborne and 101st Airborne divisions landed at the base of the Cotentin Peninsula. Although the landings were scattered, they nevertheless secured most of the routes by which the U.S. VII Corps would advance from Utah Beach, the right (west) flank of the Allied forces separated from the landings at Omaha and the other beachheads by the river Douve. The U.S. 4th Infantry Division landed on Utah Beach shortly after dawn with few casualties, and began staging for a move against Cherbourg, a fortified port critical to future Allied operations.

In the immediate aftermath of the landings, the priority for the Allies at Utah Beach was to link up with the Allied landings further east. This job was assigned to the 101st Airborne, who had landed in the area and had been both conducting raids against inland targets (such as artillery emplacements) and securing and cutting off the area from German reinforcements.

By June 9, the 101st Airborne had reorganized sufficiently from the haphazard scattering of its units. It managed to cross the flooded Douve using a few causeways across the flooded fields. The next day Carentan fell to the 101st in the Battle of Carentan. Beginning with a dawn assault, it was an all-day, hard-fought, house-to-house battle against German troops embedded in strongly prepared positions. The capture of the town gave the Allies a continuous front joining Omaha to Utah Beach and the other three lodgments to the east of Omaha. US forces maintained possession of the town despite a German armor-reinforced counterattack on June 13 just to the southwest of town known as the Battle of Bloody Gulch.

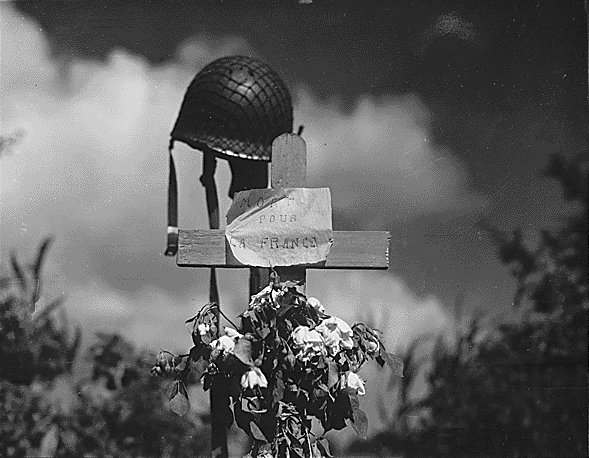
French civilians erected this silent tribute to an American soldier who fell in the effort to liberate France from German occupation, June 17, 1944

On 15 June, engineers of the Ninth Air Force IX Engineering Command began construction on a combat advanced landing ground for fighter aircraft south of the town. Declared operational on 25 June, the airfield was designated, "A-10". It was used by P-47 Thunderbolts of the 50th Fighter Group until mid-August, then as a support airfield for supplies and evacuation of wounded personnel until its closure in November. Today, a small private airfield is located on part of the wartime facility.

=== 101st Airborne March ===
The "101st Airborne March" was composed by Daniel Bourdelès, a Norman composer, for the celebration of the liberation of Carentan, in June 1944. This march created in Carentan is extracted from the CD "Carentan, the sky memory" (1994), produced by the town. It is regularly used as a musical illustration for the Normandy liberation films on France3 regional TV.

=== Heraldry ===
Arms of Carentan	The arms of Carentan are blazoned : Argent, an eagle displayed within 9 billets in orle gules, on a chief azure, 3 fleurs de lys Or.

== Sister cities ==
- Selby, United Kingdom
- Waldfischbach-Burgalben, Germany
- Hopkinsville, Kentucky, United States (since 2019)

== See also ==
- Battle of Carentan
- Communes of the Manche department
- Crociatonum
- Château de Carentan
