= Viridovix =

1st-century-BC Gallic chief

King of the Venelli

Personal details
- Born: c. 1st century BC
- Military career
- Allegiance: Unelli-led coalition
- Conflicts: Gallic Wars

Viridovix (fl. 56 BC) was the chief of Unelli, a Gallic tribe that resided on the Cotentin peninsula in what is now Normandy, in the 1st century BC. During the Roman conquest of Gaul (58–50 BC), Viridovix would lead a revolt against the Romans in 56 BC.

Legate Quintus Titurius Sabinus was sent by Caesar with three legions to crush the revolt. Sabinus would lure Viridovix into attacking his camp directly which was placed atop a hill. When the Gallic army reached the camp, exhausted from the march, the Romans sallied out and drove them back. Unprepared for the attack, the Gauls were massacred with Viridovix's fate following the battle unknown.

== Gallic Wars ==
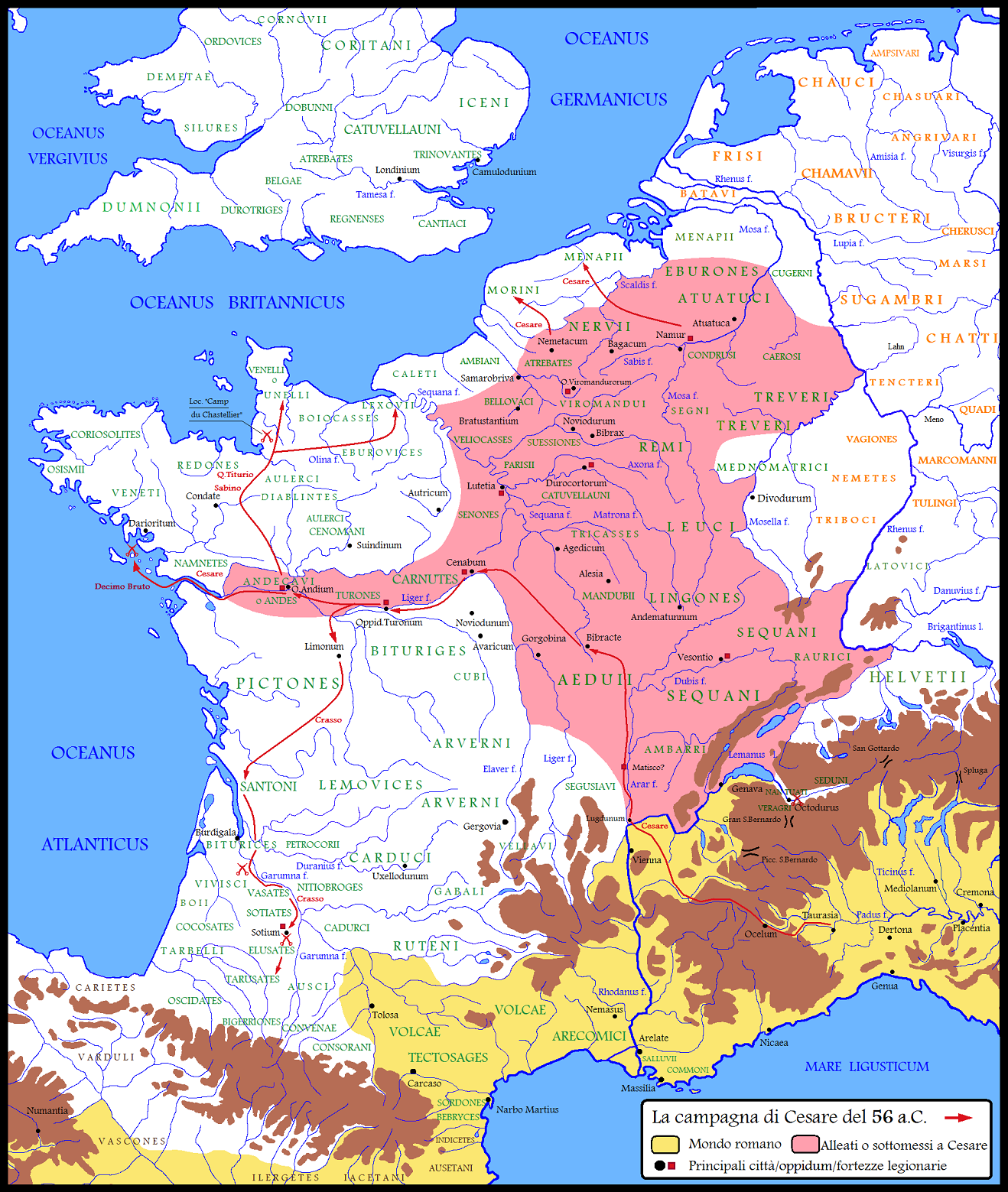
Campaign map of 56 BC. Note Quintus Titurius Sabinus's campaign against the Unelli in the northwest.

=== Background ===
In the 1st century BC, the Cotentin peninsula was inhabited by a Gallic people known as the Venelli or Unelli. In 57 BC, the second year of the Roman conquest of Gaul, Julius Caesar dispatched Publius Licinius Crassus on a campaign to conquer the various Gallic tribes who lived along the English Channel and the Unelli would ultimately submit.

=== Revolt of the Maritime Gauls ===
In 56 BC, resentment over being forced to quarter the Roman legions over the winter and desire for independence caused a series of revolts to erupt across maritime Gaul. Viridovix, who ruled as king of the Unelli at the time, would be given command of the revolting states and Caesar would dispatch Quintus Titurius Sabinus with three legions to pacify the region while he dealt with the Veneti. Viridovix would be joined by the Lexovii, Eburovices, the Aulerci, and a number of irregular infantry.

After entering the land of the Unelli, Sabinus would establish an encampment atop a hill where he confined himself and his men as he refused to attack without a significant advantage or the presence of Caesar. Viridovix would establish his own encampment two miles away and led his forces out daily to challenge Sabinus to battle but after several days without response, he and the Gauls came to consider Sabinus a coward.

After convincing the Gauls of his cowardice, Sabinus instructed a Gaul from one of his auxiliaries to defect to the enemy and falsely tell them that he intended to secretly retreat the next night to aid Caesar against the Veneti. After the false deserter did so, the Gallic forces pressured Viridovix and the Gallic leaders to assault the Roman camp and force a rout. After marching a mile uphill carrying bundles of wood to fill trenches, the Gallic forces arrived exhausted. At that moment, the Roman forces sallied out to attack the tired Gauls and forced them back downhill where they killed a great number of them and dispersed the rest with cavalry. Whether Viridovix survived the battle is unknown.

== In popular culture ==
One of the main characters of the fantasy novel series The Misplaced Legion (also known as The Videssos Cycle or The Legion Cycle) by Harry Turtledove is a Gaulish chief named Viridovix. While he comes from the same time period as the historical Viridovix, he is stated to be Lexovii rather than Unelli, and has other differences in his biography, making it likely that he is a composite character, loosely based on the historical figure.

== Sources ==
- Commentarii de Bello Gallico, Book 3, 17—19
