= Lucius Aurunculeius =

Ancient Roman nobleman of the 3rd century BCE

Lucius Aurunculeius was a nobleman of ancient Rome, of the Aurunculeia gens. He was praetor urbanus in 190 BCE. He was one of the ten commissioners sent to arrange the affairs of the Roman province of Asia at the conclusion of the war with Antiochus III the Great in 188 BCE.
