= Venelli =

Gallic tribe

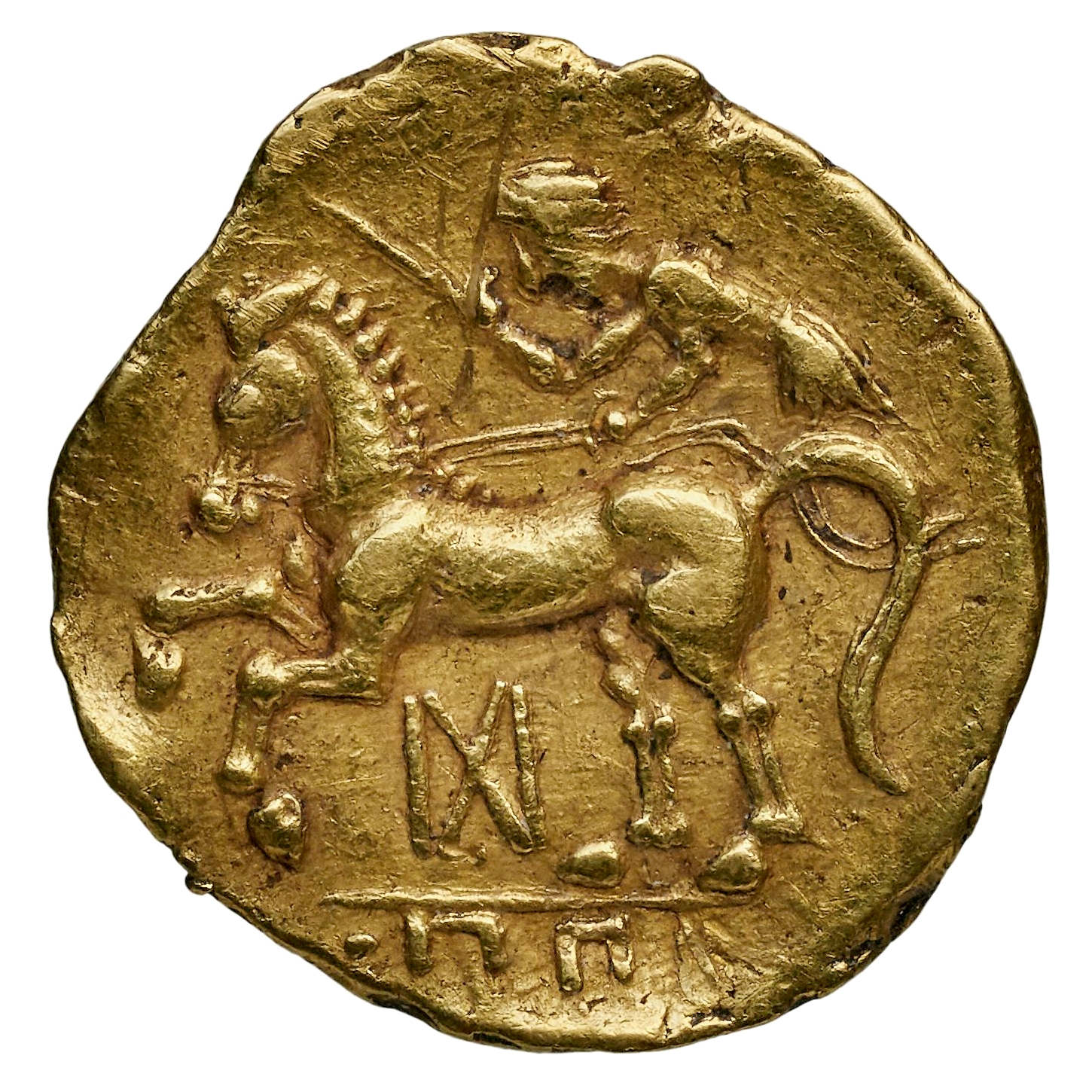
Gold quarter-stater of the Unelli depicting a charioteer driving a horse

The Venelli or Unelli (Gaulish: *Uenellī) were a Gallic tribe dwelling on the Cotentin peninsula, in the northwest of modern Normandy, during the Iron Age and the Roman period.

In 57 BC, they capitulated to Caesar's legate Publius Licinius Crassus, but rebelled the following year and sent troops to help the Gallic coalition against Rome during the Battle of Alesia (52 BC).

== Name ==
They are named in Latin as V[e]nelli by Caesar (mid-1st c. BC) and Venelli by Pliny (1st c. AD), and in Greek as Oủenéllōn (Οủενέλλων, var. Οủενeλῶν) and Oủénelloi (Οủένελλοι, var. Οủένελοι) by Ptolemy (2nd c. AD) and Oủenellous (Οủενελλους) by Cassius Dio (3rd c. AD).

The etymology of the ethnonym is obscure. It may derive from the Gaulish stem *ueni- ('clan, family, lineage').

== Geography ==
Probable evolution of the Venelli territory (Unelles on the map): during the Early Empire, it may have been divided between a northern civitas centred on Alauna (Valognes) and a southern one on Cosedia (Coutances), later Constantia; by the 4th century AD, both were merged into a single civitas Constantia.

The pre-Roman chief town of the Venelli was probably the oppidum of Mont Castre (Plessis-Lastelle, near Montsenelle). It has been identified with the stronghold of the Venelli mentioned during Sabinus's campaign against the tribe in 56 BC. The site comprises two defensive enclosures, the main one surrounding 20–30 hectares with ramparts and ditches extending over more than 2 km. Limited finds, including a Gallic coin, indicate occupation in the late Iron Age and Gallo-Roman period.

During the early Roman Empire, several settlements may have served as their capital.

The first capital was likely Crociatonum (Kroukiatonnon), mentioned by Ptolemy in the 2nd century AD and attested by a 1st–early 2nd-century milestone found at Sainte-Mère-Église. The place also appears in the Antonine Itinerary and the Peutinger Table, though these sources do not confirm that it kept it status as a civitas capital. Its precise location remains uncertain, with Carentan or Saint-Côme-du-Mont most often proposed.

At an uncertain date, evidence suggests that the area came to be divided into two civitates: a northern district centred on Alauna (Valognes), mentioned as the starting point of an Antonine itinerary, and a southern district administered from Cosedia (Coutances), which later became Constantia in the Notitia Dignitatum.

After Diocletian's administrative reforms in the early 4th century AD, both civitates were merged, and a single civitas Constantia was administered from Constantia (Coutances), which served as both a military prefecture and an episcopal see. The capital had been renamed from Cosedia to Constantia; a medieval tradition reported by Orderic Vitalis (12th c. AD) links this change to Constantius Chlorus's campaigns along the Channel coast. Unusually, the surrounding territory took its name from the capital, becoming the pagus Constantinus (modern Cotentin), first attested in the 9th-century Vita of Saint Marculf.

== History ==
Caesar mentions them with the Veneti, Osismi, Curiosolitae, and other maritime states. The Unelli and the rest submitted to Publius Licinius Crassus in 57 BC; but in 56 BC it was necessary to send a force again into the country of the Unelli, Curiosolitae, and Lexovii. Quintus Titurius Sabinus had the command of the three legions who were to keep the Unelli and their neighbours quiet. The commander of the Unelli was Viridovix, and he was also at the head of all the forces of the states which had joined the Unelli, among whom were the Aulerci Eburovices and the Lexovii. The force of Viridovix was very large, and he was joined by desperate men from all parts of Gallia, robbers and those who were 'too idle to till the ground'. The Roman general entrenched himself in his camp, and made the Galli believe that he was afraid and was intending to slip away by night. The trick deceived the Galli, and they attacked the Roman camp, which was well placed on an eminence with a sloping ascent to it about a mile (1.6 km) in length. On the Galli reaching the Roman camp exhausted by a rapid march up the hill and encumbered with the fascines which they carried for filling up the ditch, the Romans sallied out by two gates and punished the enemy well for their temerity. They slaughtered an immense number of the Galli, and the cavalry pursuing the remainder let few escape. This feat of arms is told clearly in the Commentaries.

The Unelli sent a contingent of 6000 men to attack Caesar at the siege of Alesia in 52 BC. (B. G. vii. 75.)
