= Crociatonum =

Ancient Roman town in Normandy, France

Crociatonum (Greek: Κροκιάτονον, Ptol. ii. 8) or Cronciaconnum, is a place included on the Tabula Peutingeriana in the present-day Normandy region of France. Ptolemy makes it a port of the Unelli or Veneli, a Gallic nation that occupied part of Armorica. The Peutinger Table contains a route from Alauna to Caesarodunum (modern Tours), in which the next station to Alauna is Cronciaconnum, distant 10½ Roman miles (milia passuum, or M. P. ("1,000 paces")) from Alauna. Its position, therefore, depends on that of Alauna. Crociatonum lies between Alauna and Augustodorus (modern Bayeux), from which it is 31½ M. P. distant. D'Anville, who places Alauna at the Moutiers d'Alonne, fixes Crociatonum at Valognes, in the department of Manche. Accordingly, he considers that there is an error in Ptolemy, for the place is called a port in one manuscript at least. But if Alauna is at or near Valognes, as most modern geographers contend, Crociatonum must be looked for elsewhere. Walckenaer places it at the village of Turqueville, west of Audouville-la-Hubert, at the entrance of the Bay of Isigny. There may have been both a town and a port of the same name. Some geographers, including the editors of the Barrington Atlas of the Greek and Roman World would fix Crociatonum at Carentan, west of Isigny-sur-Mer.

Crociatonum appears to be a composite of Crocq (spur of land), i (of) aton (place name), um (town). Coutances is usually given as the town of the Unelli; it is also the correct distance ratios from Moutiers d'Alonne and Bayeux. To the west of Coutances, north of the Sienne estuary, is a spur of land (Crocq) ending at Pointe Agon; it would appear that Crociatonum (Crociagonum) ought to be the port on the Sienne estuary serving Coutances.
