= Château de Carentan =

Former French castle

Château de Carentan (French pronunciation: [ʃato də kaʁɑ̃tɑ̃]) was a castle in Carentan, Manche, France.

A castle has existed at Carentan since the 11th century. The castle was besieged by Jean de Vienne in July 1375, with the English garrison surrendering. King Henry IV of France gave orders to destroy the fortifications and the castle in 1595.
