= Ambiorix's revolt =

Belgae rebellion against Julius Caesar, winter 54 BCE – 53 BCE

- Part of the Gallic Wars
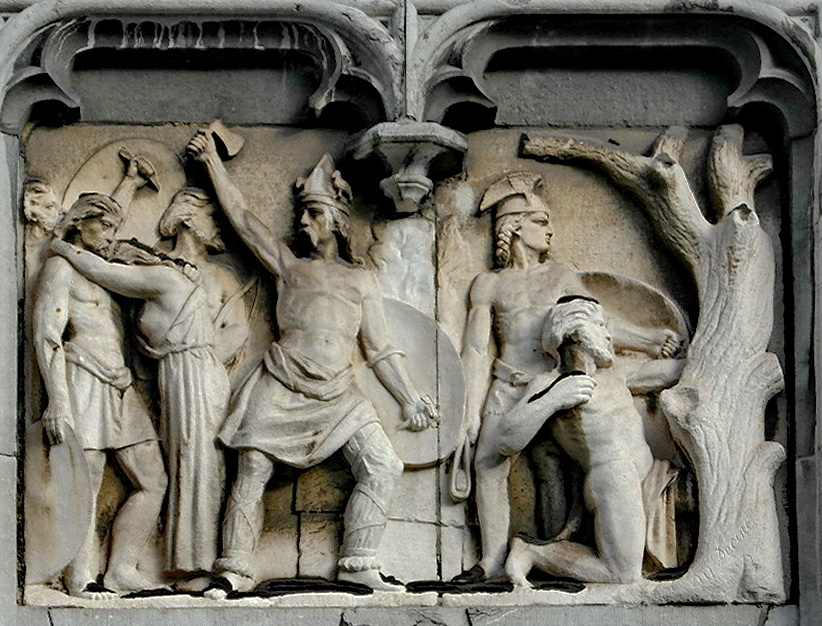
- Ambiorix attacking Roman soldiers, relief at the Liège Provincial Palace
| Date | 54 BCE – 53 BCE |
| Location | Atuatuca Tungrorum (modern Tongeren, in Belgium), |
| Result | Roman victory |

Belligerents
| Roman Republic, Julius Caesar | Eburones |

Commanders and leaders
| (Julius Caesar); Aurunculeius Cotta †; Quintus Sabinus (executed) | Ambiorix; Catuvolcus |

Units involved
| Legio XIV | Eburones warriors |

Strength
| 6,000–9,000 | 6,000–9,000 men. |

Casualties and losses
| 6,000–9,000 killed some escaped | unknown |

Ambiorix's revolt was a rebellion of the Eburones tribe, triggered by the occupation of their territory by a part of Caesar's army. The uprising took place in the winter of 54–53 BCE and is part of Caesar's Gallic Wars. The tribe had appointed two war-leaders to command their warriors during their insurrection: Ambiorix and Catuvolcus. The revolt was afterwards named after Ambiorix, who played a more prominent role in the rebellion.

Discontent among the subjugated Gauls prompted a major uprising amongst the Belgae against Julius Caesar in the winter of 54–53 BCE, when the Eburones of north-eastern Gaul rose in rebellion. Fifteen Roman cohorts were wiped out at Atuatuca (modern Tongeren in Belgium) and a garrison commanded by Quintus Tullius Cicero narrowly survived after being relieved by Caesar in the nick of time. The rest of 53 BCE was occupied with a punitive campaign against the Eburones and their allies, who were said to have been all but exterminated by the Romans.

== Prelude ==
In 58–56 BCE Julius Caesar conquered most of Gaul including the territory of the Belgae tribes (Note: Modernday Northern France, Belgium, the Netherlands south of the Rhine and the north-western portion of North Rhine-Westphalia, Germany.). At the Battle of the Axona Caesar dispersed a large coalition of Belgae tribes. In the Battle of the Sabis Caesar defeated the Nervii, Viromandui, Aduatuci and Atrebates. After this he turned against the Atuatuci, captured their stronghold, and sold the entire tribe into slavery. After these defeats most Belgae tribes were cowed into compliance with Rome.

At the end of the campaigning season of 54 BCE Caesar returned from his invasion of Britain, he called the leaders of the Gallic tribes to a meeting to settle the affairs of Gaul and then supervised the movement of his army into winter quarters. The harvest had been poor forcing Caesar to split up his army and disperse his legions over a wide area. Most were quartered among the Belgae tribes whose alliance with Rome remained uncertain. Fifteen cohorts were sent to winter in the territory of the Eburones at a place called Atuatuca. This force included the entire Fourteenth legion, five (independent) cohorts. (Note: It is not clear whether these cohorts were detached from other legions or were independent units – Caesar was to raise at least 20 cohorts in Transalpine Gaul, where recruits did not have Roman or Latin status and could therefore not be formed into a legion.), some Iberian cavalry and there may have been some other auxiliaries as well, the force probably numbered 6,000–9,000 men. (Note: There is some debate about the size of the force under Sabinus and Cotta. We don't know whether the 14th legion and the cohorts were at full strength – probably not. We also don't know the size of the auxiliary units that accompanied them. Therefore we should use 6,000–9,000 range for the force's strength numbers.) It was commanded by two of Caesar's legates, Quintus Titurius Sabinus and Lucius Aurunculeius Cotta, both of whom had held independent commands in the past and had proved reasonably competent. Caesar does not mention who held the overall authority, but his narrative implies they were jointly in command.

== The Revolt of the Eburones ==
=== First Attack and deception ===
According to Caesar, Ambiorix and his warband were equal in number to Sabinus' and Cotta's men. They attacked and killed several Roman soldiers who were foraging for wood in the vicinity of their camp. The survivors fled back to their comrades, followed by Ambiorix and his men. The Romans counterattacked from their camp and drove off the Eburones warriors. Ambiorix came forward and set up a parley with the Romans. He claimed he had been forced to go to war by his people. He also told them about a conspiracy throughout Gaul for each tribe to attack the legions quartered in their territory on this set day. He admitted his debt to Caesar who had taken his side in certain disputes but said that, because of the limited strength of the Eburones, he was compelled to take action under pressure from the other tribes who were determined to win their freedom from the yoke of Rome.

He claimed that a huge force of Germans, greatly angered by Caesar’s successes against the Belgae and his defeat of Ariovistus, were about to cross the Rhine and offered to give the Romans safe passage to the forts of either of two nearby legions (Note: Quintus Tullius Cicero was encamped with his legion among the Nervii, while Titus Labienus was encamped with his legion among the Treveri – these Belgae tribes all lived near the Eburones.) to better resist this Germanic force.

=== Debate ===
The Roman representatives, Quintus Junius and Gaius Arpineius, took the news back to the beleaguered fort. A council of war, attended by the leading officers and centurions, was formed. During this council, two opposing opinions took form. Speaking first, Cotta argued that they should not move without an order from Caesar. He pointed out that experience had shown them that Germans could be resisted from behind their fortifications, that they had plenty of supplies, were within easy reach of assistance from nearby legions and that they should take at face value neither the news nor the advice of an enemy.

Denying that he was motivated by fear, Quintus Titurius Sabinus said that he believed that Caesar was on his way to Italy, that the Germans were about to add to the number of the besieging Eburones and that it seemed that they were about to face the combined wrath of grudge-ridden Germans and Gauls — for surely the militarily weak Eburones would not dare to face a Roman legion otherwise.

Moreover, he said it would be better to make for a nearby legion and face the trouble with their comrades than to risk famine through a prolonged siege. The officers told their commanders that whichever view prevailed was not as important as coming to a unanimous decision. Cotta was finally forced to give way and Sabinus prevailed.

=== Roman defeat ===
The Romans spent the night in disarray, putting together their belongings and preparing to march out of the fort once morning came. The enemy heard the hubbub in the fort and prepared an ambush. When dawn broke, the Romans, in marching order (long columns of soldiers with each unit following the other), more heavily burdened than usual left the fort. When the greater part of the column had entered a ravine, the Gauls assaulted them from either side and sought to harry the rearguard and prevent the vanguard from leaving the ravine.

Caesar notes that Sabinus lost his mind, running from cohort to cohort and issuing ineffectual orders. Cotta, by contrast, kept his cool and did his duty as a commander, in action his duty as a soldier. Due to the length of the column, the commanders could not issue orders efficiently so they passed word along the line to the units to form into a square. The troops fought bravely though with fear and in clashes were successful.

Thus, Ambiorix ordered his men to discharge their spears into the troops, to fall back if attacked by a group of Romans and chase back the Romans when they tried to fall into rank. During the engagement, Cotta was hit full in the face by a sling-shot.

Then Sabinus sent word to Ambiorix to treat for surrender, a proposal which was acceded to. Cotta refused to come to terms and remained steadfast in his refusal to surrender, while Sabinus followed through with his plan to surrender.

However, Ambiorix, after promising Sabinus his life and the safety of his troops, distracted him with a long speech, all the while slowly surrounding him and his men and then slaughtering them; The Belgae charged down en masse onto the waiting Romans where they killed Cotta, still fighting, and the great majority of the troops. The remainder fell back to the fort where, despairing of help, they killed each other. Only a few men slipped away and made it to the camp of Titus Labienus and informed him of the disaster. Overall, one legion, five cohorts and several auxiliary units, some 6,000–9,000 men were killed on the Romans side. Belgae casualties are unknown.

== Aftermath ==
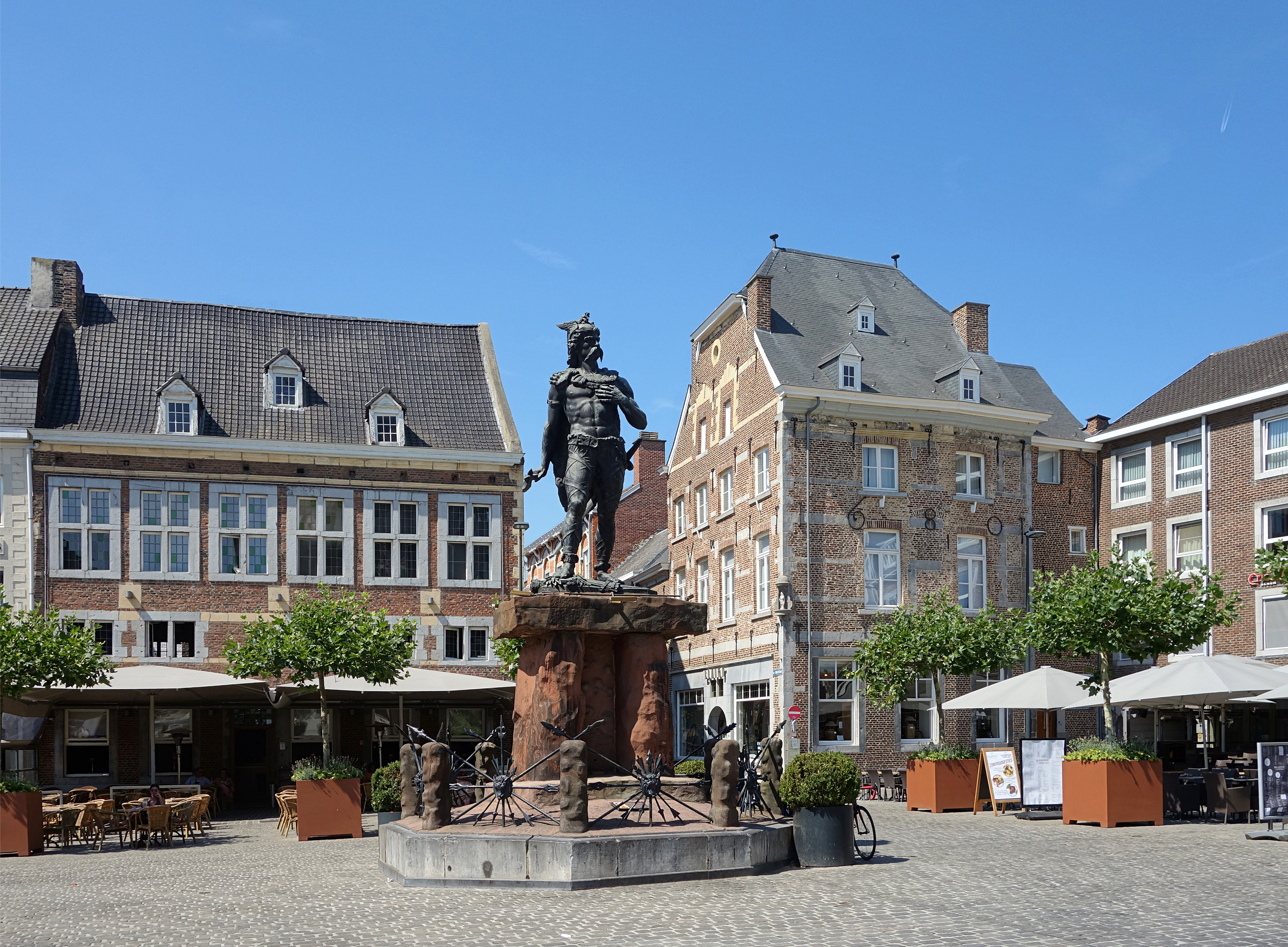
Statue of Ambiorix in Tongeren (a fanciful interpretation, rather than an archaeological reconstruction, of his possible appearance)

After defeating Cotta and Sabinus, Ambiorix tried to raise a general revolt of the Belgae peoples. A Belgae attack on Quintus Tullius Cicero (younger brother of the orator Cicero), then stationed with a legion in the territory of the Nervii, led to a siege of the Roman camp during which Ambiorix unsuccessfully tried to repeat his earlier bluff. The attack ultimately failed due to the timely appearance of Caesar who dispersed the Belgae attackers. (Note: Caesar lured the Nervii and their allies away from Cicero’s camp. He then goaded them into attacking his own camp, counterattacking once they were fully committed.)

Titus Labienus, who was stationed in the southern Ardennes with his legion, discovered that Indutiomarus and the Treveri were rebelling as well. The Treverian leader called for aid from the Senones and Germanic tribes east of the Rhine. Labienus's legion withstood the siege and Indutiomarus was killed after an unsuccessful attack. (Note: For days the Treveri formed up for battle, but Labienus repeatedly declined to leave the safety of his defences. One day as the Treveri once again dispered after unsuccessfully challenging the Romans to battle, Labienus sent out his cavalry. His men were ordered to ignore everyone but Indutiomarus. He was caught and beheaded. Without their leader, his warriors gave up and went home.) His relatives made their escape across the Rhine.

Over the winter Caesar rebuilt and enlarged his army; he raised double the number of troops he had lost. Two new legions were recruited in Cisalpine Gaul, a new Fourteenth to replace the massacred unit and the Fifteenth. He requested the First legion from his fellow triumvir, his former son-in-law, Pompey. (Note: The First legion had been raised by Caesar for his triumviral colleague Pompey and been intended to form part of Pompey's army on the Iberian Peninsula. The First had taken an oath to Pompey; hence its number came from a different sequence. Not planning any major campaign of his own, Pompey agreed to 'loan' the new legion to Caesar 'for the good of the Republic and out of personal friendship'.) Caesar now had ten legions.

Before targeting the Eburones themselves, Caesar first attacked Ambiorix's allies, forcing them to promise that they would not help the tribe who had destroyed Cotta and Sabinus. The Nervii were the first victims of the Roman retaliation. During that winter a force of four legions laid waste the fields, took a great many cattle and prisoners. (Note: The Romans had a word for laying waste to the enemy's territory, vastatio, which is the root for the English word devastation (de-vastatio-n), with the verb vastare for the process.) The Menapii were then attacked by five legions to deprive Ambiorix of potential help. Five legions were sent because, according to Caesar, they, alone of all the tribes of Gaul, had never sent ambassadors to him to discuss terms of peace, and had ties of hospitality with Ambiorix. A renewed campaign of devastation finally forced them to submit, and Caesar placed his ally Commius of the Atrebates in control of them.

Before the final phase of his campaign to punish the rebellious tribes (the assault on the Eburones), Caesar built a bridge across the Rhine and campaigned in Germania to punish the German tribes who had aided the Treveri. The Suebi withdrew away from the Rhine, further into their heartland and started gathering their forces. The Ubii quickly sent envoys telling Caesar that they had stayed faithful to their alliance with Rome. Caesar decided against a campaign in Suebi territory, returned to the west bank of the Rhine and demolished the bridge behind him. The legions now marched against the Eburones and started what was essentially a genocide. (Note: In our day Caesar's action would meet the criteria of a genocide; there was definite intend to destroy the Eburones as a people – Caesar declared that the "stock and name of the tribe" (stirps ac nomen civitatis) should be destroyed. In Caesar's day, however, such actions were often seen as legitimate retribution. Roman ideology justified mass violence against rebellious peoples. This is not to justify what Caesar did, merely to place it into context.)

Caesar sends his cavalry ahead of the main army. They catch the Eburones by surprise; no coordinated resistance is put up. Caesar then starts devastating the tribe's lands with nine legions divided in three columns. He also issues a decree throughout Gaul, granting permission for anyone to plunder the Eburones and their allies. Many Gallic and Germanic warriors respond to the call and soon several warbands arrive and start plundering the tribes's territory. The Eburones ceased to exist following the campaign.

Eventually, Caesar's campaigns against the Belgae lasted several years, but ultimately the tribes were no match for 50,000 well-trained, well-equipped Roman soldiers. (Note: Caesar declared Gaul pacified at the end of 51 BCE. Although the Bellovaci would rise again in 46 BCE and had to be suppressed.)

The fate of the leaders of the revolt is different but neither was taken to walk in Caesar's triumphal parade. Cativolcus was now old, weak and unable to endure the hardships of flight. He solemnly cursed Ambiorix for instigating the conspiracy, and then committed suicide by poisoning himself with yew. Ambiorix and his men, however, managed to cross the Rhine and disappeared without a trace.

== Bibliography ==
=== Modern literature ===
- Delbrück, Hans. History of the Art of War Vol I. ISBN 978-0-8032-6584-4
- Goldsworthy, Adrian, Caesar: The Life of a Colossus, Weidenfeld & Nicolson an imprint of Orion Books Ltd, 2007. ISBN 978-0-7538-2158-9
- Hock, Adrien. Etudes sur quelques campagnes de Jules César dans la Gaule-Belgique. Vue d'après nature, carte et plans. Namur, publisher: Ad. Wesmael-Charlier, 1897. Pages 75–97. available on line

=== Ancient sources ===
- Cassius Dio xl. 7-11;
- Gaius Julius Caesar, The Gallic War, Loeb Edition, 2004.
