= Quintus Titurius Sabinus =

1st century BC Roman legate

- Died: 54 BC; Atuatuca, Gaul
- Cause of death: Killed in an ambush by Gallic forces led by Ambiorix
- Occupation: General
- Office: Legate c. 57–54 BC
- Military career
- Allegiance: Roman Republic
- Branch: Roman Army
- Commands: Legio XIV Gemina
- Conflicts: Gallic Wars; Revolt of Viridovix; Ambiorix's revolt †

Quintus Titurius Sabinus (Latin: Quīntus Titūrius Sabīnus, Classical Latin pronunciation: [ˈkᶣiːn.tʊs tɪˈtuː.ri.ʊs saˈbiː.nʊs]; died 54 BC) was a Roman legate who served under Julius Caesar during the Roman conquest of Gaul. He is known primarily though Caesar's Commentarii de Bello Gallico where he is credited with participating in Caesar's campaign against the Belgae in 57 BC and leading a successful campaign to crush the revolt of Viridovix in 56 BC.

In the winter of 54–53 BC, Sabinus and Lucius Aurunculeius Cotta would be stationed along with the Fourteenth legion at Aduatuca in the land of the Eburones, a Belgic tribe, where they would be massacred during a revolt led by Ambiorix.

== Gallic Wars ==
=== Early campaigns ===
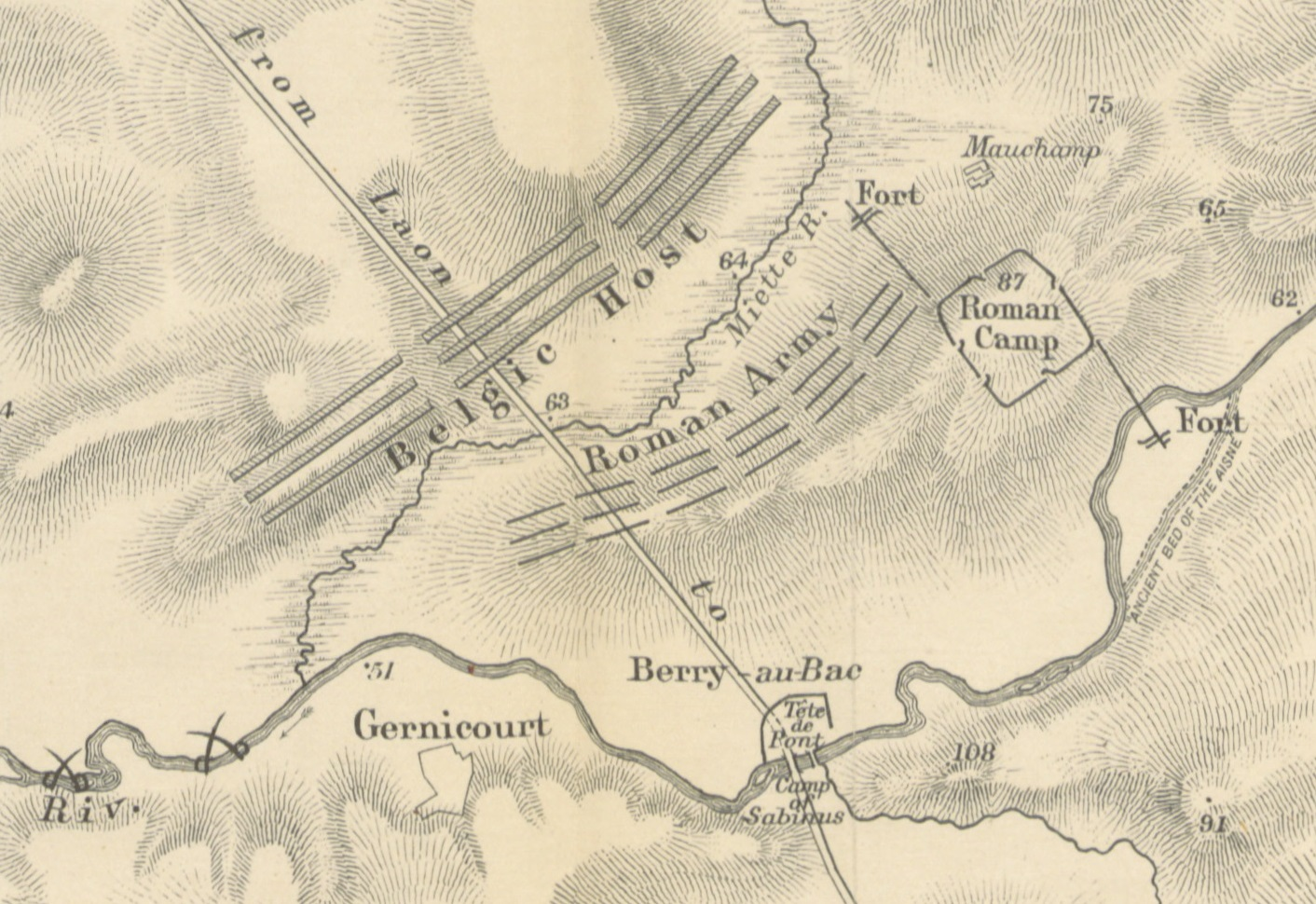
Map of troop placements at the Battle of the Axona. Note Sabinus' troops stationed at the bridge.

Sabinus is first mentioned in Book II of Commentarii de Bello Gallico during Caesar's campaign against the Belgae in 57 BC when he was ordered to guard a bridge over the Axona river in the lands of the Remi as Caesar moved to relieve the siege of Bibrax. When Belgic forces crossed the Axona elsewhere in an attempt to attack Caesar's camp during the Battle of the Axona, Sabinus reported this movement to Caesar which allowed him to thwart the maneuver and forced the Belgae to retreat.

In 56 BC, three tribes of maritime Gaul: the Venelli, Curiosolitae, and Lexovii rose up in revolt against the Roman occupiers under the leadership of Viridovix and Sabinus would be dispatched with three legions to quell the uprising. After establishing a camp atop a hill and enduring several days of raids, he ordered one of his Gallic allies to falsely defect to the enemy and convince them that he was cowardly and intended to flee that night. Upon hearing this, the Gallic rebels launched an immediate assault on the encampment. After the Gauls marched over a mile uphill to the camp, Sabinus ordered the legionnaires to sally out where they drove the surprised and exhausted Gauls back and routed them completely, crushing the revolt.

=== Revolt of the Eburones ===
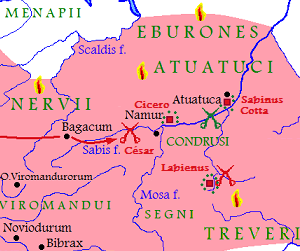
Campaign map of Ambiorix's revolt (54–53). Note Sabinus and Cotta's defeat at Atuatuca

In late 54 BC, Caesar ordered Sabinus and Lucius Aurunculeius Cotta to move the Fourteenth legion and five additional cohorts into the territory of the Eburones, a Belgic tribe who resided between the Rhine and the Meuse, to quarter for the winter. They were received by the Eburonian kings, Catuvolcus and Ambiorix, and would construct an encampment near the town of Atuatuca. According to Caesar, Catuvolcus and Ambiorix would receive a message around this time from the anti-Roman Indutiomarus encouraging them to revolt. Sabinus and Cotta had only been in the country for about a fortnight when they were suddenly attacked by Ambiorix and his forces. After a brief skirmish, Ambiorix met with the legates and claimed that he was forced to go to war with them by his people and that an army of Germanic warriors were moving to cross the Rhine and attack.

Sabinus and Cotta debated how to respond to the news with Sabinus arguing that the they should move to the Rhine and face the Germans there while Cotta argued that they should remain where they are and fight the Germans from their current fortifications. Ultimately, Cotta relented and the Romans made preparations to depart. As the Roman forces were marching through a ravine, the Gauls led by Ambiorix ambushed them from either side and prevent the vanguard and rearguard from exiting the ravine.

In Caesar's description of events Sabinus is said to have lost his mind, running from cohort to cohort and issuing ineffectual orders while Cotta remained cool-headed. Due to the length of the column, the commanders could not issue orders efficiently so they passed word along the line to the units to form into a square. After hours of fighting, Sabinus attempted to parley with Ambiorix to negotiate a surrender while Cotta refused and continued to resist. After throwing down their weapons, Sabinus and his party began to discuss terms with Ambiorix but the Gauls slowly surrounded them before rushing forward and slaughtering them all. Cotta and the majority of troops would be killed in the ensuing massacre. A few legionnaires escaped and made their way to the camp of Titus Labienus where they informed him of the disaster.

== Sources ==
- Caes. B. G. ii. 5, iii. 11, 17—19, v. 24—37
- Dion Cass. xxxix. 45, xl. 5, 6
- Suet. Caes. 25
- Livy EpiL 106
- Florus iii. 10
- Orosius vi. 10
- Eutropius vi. 14
