= Cativolcus =

Eburonian king (died 53 BC)

Catuvolcus

King of the Eburones
- In office ?? BC – 53 BC Serving with Ambiorix

Personal details
- Died: 53 BC Belgic confederation
- Military career
- Allegiance: Eburones
- Conflicts: Gallic Wars; Ambiorix's revolt ‡‡

Cativolcus or Catuvolcus (died 53 BC) was one of the two kings of the Eburones, a Belgic tribe that resided between the Meuse and Rhine rivers in what is now Belgium. Cativolcus shared the kingship with Ambiorix and in the winter of 54–53 BC, the two would lead an insurrection against the Romans.

For the rest of 53 BC, the Roman legions would devastate the territories of the Eburones in a punitive retaliatory campaign. The elderly Cativolcus, unable to endure the labors of war, would commit suicide by either hanging himself from a yew tree or drinking the tree's poison.

== Name ==
The Gaulish personal name Catu-uolcos ('war-Wolf, battle-Wolves') is a compound formed with the stem catu- ('battle') attached to uolcos ('battle, wolf'). The Eburonian name has an exact parallel in the Middle Welsh cadwalch ('hero, champion, warrior'), both stemming from a Proto-Celtic form *katuwolkos. It is cognate with the Gaulish ethnonym Volcae.

== Biography ==
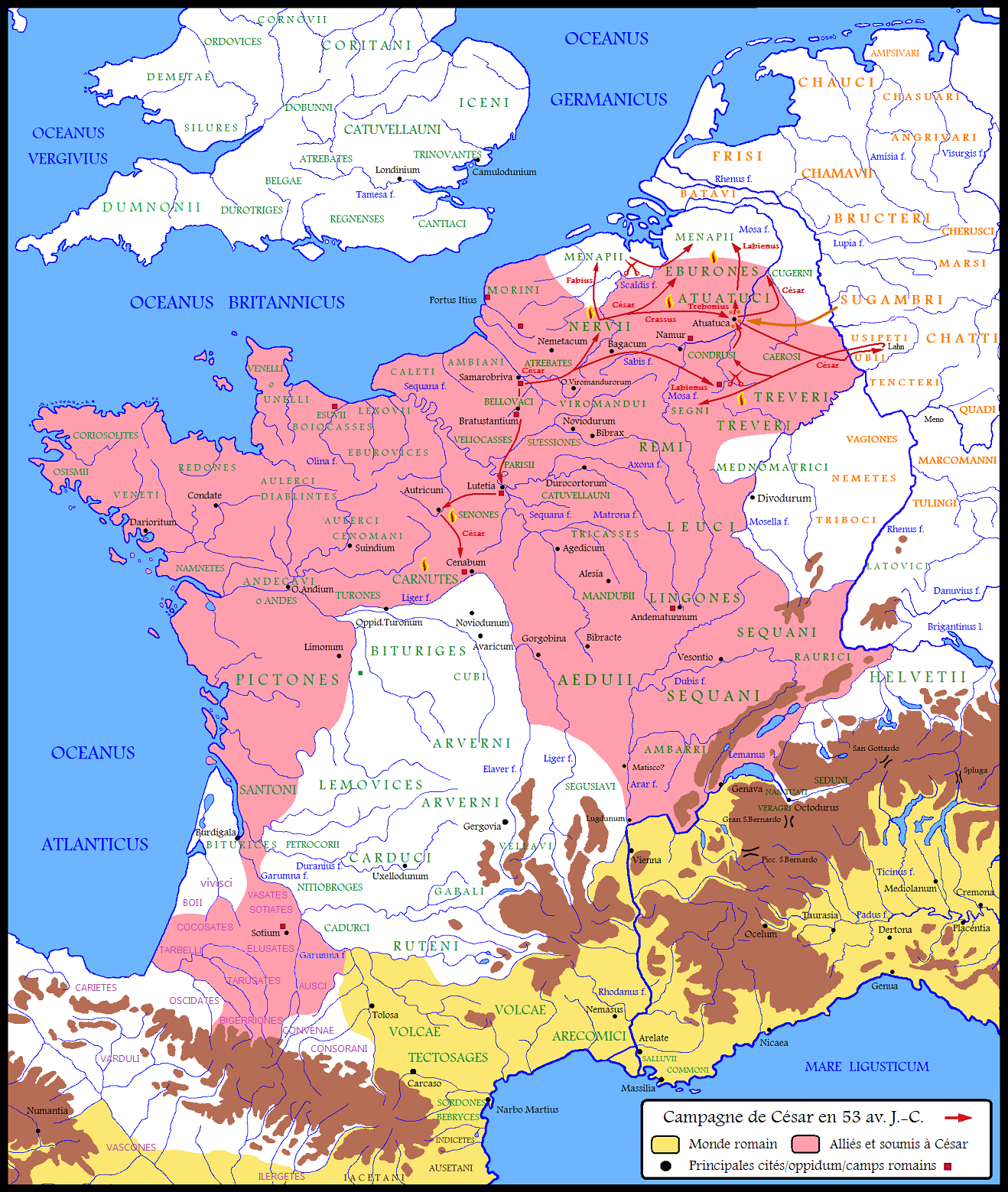
Campaign map of 53 BC. Revolting tribes are shown with flame icons.

Little of Cativolcus's life before the Gallic Wars is known. In 58 BC, Julius Caesar would begin his conquest of Gaul and the following year, his forces would invade and occupy the lands of the Belgae, a confederation of tribes who resided in northern Gaul between the English Channel, the west bank of the Rhine, and the north bank of the Seine. Among the Belgic tribes were the Eburones to which Cativolcus belonged.

=== Revolt of the Eburones (54–53 BC) ===
Upon returning from his second invasion of Britain in late 54 BC, Caesar would send 15 cohorts commanded by Quintus Titurius Sabinus and Lucius Aurunculeius Cotta to winter in Atuatuca among the Eburones who were co-ruled by Catuvolcus and Ambiorix. According to Caesar, Ambiorix and Catuvolcus would receive messages from Indutiomarus of the Treveri encouraging them to revolt. About a fortnight later, Ambiorix would lead an attack on the Roman camp that would be repulsed before meeting with Cotta and Sabinus where he claimed that he'd been forced to go to war by his people and that a large German force was moving to cross the Rhine. As Cotta and Sabinus moved to meet the alleged threat, Belgic forces led by Ambiorix would ambush them, massacring the Roman force and killing both.

Over the winter, Caesar would rebuild his forces and launch a new campaign to pacify the Belgae. Following punitive campaigns against Ambiorix's allies among the Menapii, the Nervii, and the Suebi, the Romans would devastate the Eburones with Lucius Minucius Basilus scattering Ambiorix's men with a cavalry attack that struck before the Gauls had time to assemble. Caesar claims that following this defeat, Cativolcus committed suicide by either hanging himself from a yew tree or drinking the tree's poison as he was too old to endure the effort of retreat or further conflict, and that he did so while cursing Ambiorix for instigating the revolt.
