= Cingetorix =

Cingetorix, meaning "marching king" or "king of warriors", is a Celtic name borne by two chieftains of the 1st century BC, as related by Julius Caesar in his De Bello Gallico:

- Cingetorix (Gaul), one of the two chieftains struggling for the supremacy of the Treveri of Gaul.
- Cingetorix (Briton), one of the four kings of Kent during Caesar's second expedition to Britain in 54 BC, alongside Segovax, Carvilius and Taximagulus.
