= Lucius Aurunculeius Cotta =

1st century BC Roman legate

- Died: 54 BC; Atuatuca, Gaul
- Cause of death: Killed in an ambush by Gallic forces led by Ambiorix
- Occupation: General
- Office: Legate c. 58–54 BC
- Military career
- Allegiance: Roman Republic
- Branch: Roman Army
- Commands: Legio XIV Gemina
- Conflicts: Gallic Wars; Ambiorix's revolt

Lucius Aurunculeius Cotta (Latin: Lūcius Aurunculēius Cotta, Classical Latin pronunciation: [ˈɫuː.ki.ʊs au̯.rʊŋ.kʊˈɫeː.i.ʊs ˈkɔt.ta]; died 54 BC) was an officer in the Gallic army of Gaius Julius Caesar. The little we know of Cotta is found in Book V of Caesar's De Bello Gallico. In 54 BC, when Caesar returned to Gaul from his second expedition to Britain, he found food in short supply. He therefore spread out his eight legions amongst a larger number of Gallic states from which to draw their sustenance during the winter. To the eighth legion, which had recently been raised from across the Po (trans Padum) he added another five cohorts, appointing Quintus Titurius Sabinus and Lucius Aurunculeius Cotta as the legati commanding them.

== Revolt of the Eburones ==
=== Initial attack and deception ===
The troops of Sabinus and Cotta were sent by Caesar into the country of the Eburones, in Belgica, most of which lies between the Meuse and the Rhine where they set up Fort Aduatuca in which to winter. The Eburones tribe was under the rule of Ambiorix and Catuvolcus. These two, instigated by the Treveri, collected their men and after a fortnight, fell on a detachment of Romans who were collecting wood. The marauding Eburones went on to assault the Roman fort. The Roman infantry mounted the ramparts and despatched a squadron of Spanish horse which, falling on the flank of the enemy, routed them in that engagement.

Then, Ambiorix set up a parley with the Romans in which he admitted his debt to Caesar who had taken his side in certain disputes with other Gallic tribes but said that, despite the limited strength of the Eburones, he was compelled to take action by pressure from the other tribes who were determined to win their freedom from the yoke of Rome. He pointed out that a huge force of Germans, greatly angered by Caesar's successes, were rampaging across the Rhine and offered to give the Romans safe passage to the fort of either of two nearby legions.

=== Debate ===
The Roman representatives, Quintus Junius, a Spaniard and Gaius Arpineius, took the news back to the beleaguered fort. A council of war, attended by the leading officers and NCOs, was formed. During this council, two opposing opinions took form. Speaking first, Cotta argued that they should not move without an order from Caesar. He pointed out that experience had shown them that Germans could be resisted from behind Roman fortifications, that they had plenty of supplies, were within easy reach of assistance from nearby legions and that they should not take at face value either the news or the advice of an enemy.

Sabinus took a grimmer view. Denying that he was motivated by fear, he said that he believed that Caesar was on his way to Italy, that the Germans were about to add to the number of the besieging Eburones and that it seemed that they were about to face the combined wrath of grudge-ridden Germans and Gauls, as surely the militarily weak Eburones would not dare face a Roman legion otherwise. Moreover, he said it would be better to make for a nearby legion and face the trouble with their comrades than to risk famine through a prolonged siege. The officers told their commanders that whichever view prevailed was not as important as coming to a unanimous decision. Cotta was eventually forced to give way and Sabinus prevailed.

=== Ambush and defeat ===
The Romans spent the night in minor disarray, putting together their belongings and preparing to march out of the fort once morning came. The enemy heard the sound of the Romans packing up from outside and prepared an ambush. When dawn broke, the Romans, in marching order (long columns of soldiers with each unit following the other), more heavily burdened than usual, departed the fort. When a large part of the column had entered a nearby ravine, the Gauls assaulted them from the front and back to both tie up the rearguard and prevent the vanguard from leaving the ravine.

Caesar notes that Sabinus lost his mind, running from cohort to cohort and issuing ineffectual orders. Cotta, by contrast, kept calm and "did his duty as a commander, in action his duty as a soldier". Due to the length of the column, the commanders could not issue orders efficiently so they passed word along the line to form a square. The troops fought bravely and in most of the clashes came out on top, even though fear and panic was close to overcoming them. Thus, Ambiorix ordered his men to throw javelins into the troops, to fall back if met with heavy resistance and harass the Romans if they tried to fall into rank. During the engagement it is said Cotta was hit in the head by a sling stone.

Sabinus sent word to Ambiorix to parlay for a Roman surrender. Ambiorix acceded to the request and even though he was wounded, Cotta refused to come to terms and said he'd never contemplate surrendering. Sabinus followed through with his plan to meet with Ambiorix, who after promising Sabinus his life and the safety of his troops, had him surrounded and cut down. The Gauls then charged the remaining Romans who had their guard lowered as they were waiting on word from Sabinus' meeting. Even though the wounded Cotta continued to fight bravely, he and the majority of his legionaries were quickly undone by the unexpected enemy charge. A small contingent who managed to escape fell back to the fort where in utter despair they decided to commit suicide. A handful of men slipped away in another direction and proceeded to find Titus Labienus, a legate of a nearby legion and inform him of the disaster.

== Other mentions ==
Caesar mentions Cotta a few other times in the Commentarii de Bello Gallico. In book II; 11, During the Belgic campaign, Caesar appointed Cotta and Quintus Pedius to command the cavalry. In book IV; 22, Caesar left Cotta and Sabinus in command of the legions in Gaul to suppress the Menapii and the Morini if they caused trouble while Caesar was carrying out his first invasion of Britain. In Book IV; 38, after the invasion of Britain, Caesar notes that while Labienus was sent to quell the Morini, Cotta and Sabinus returned from devastating the territories of the Menapii who fled into the densest forests in their territory. Caesar recounts, in Book V; 52 how he learnt of the death of Cotta and Sabinus from prisoners captured by the besieged garrison of Quintus Tullius Cicero, another Lieutenant-General, whose force was the next to be attacked after the disaster. In Book VI; 32, Caesar en passant notes that the name of the fort, in which Cotta and Sabinus had been encamped during their last days fighting the Eburones was called Aduatuca. In Book VI; 37, Caesar tells how later, a garrison of soldiers at Aduatuca, themselves besieged, were fearful of their being stationed in the same fort which the legion of Cotta and Sabinus had occupied before their destruction.

== See also ==
- Aurunculeia gens
