= Atuatuca =

Roman-era settlement in modern Belgium

Atuatuca (or Aduatuca) is the name of two ancient fortified settlements located in the eastern part of modern Belgium, between the Scheldt and Rhine rivers. The oldest one, Atuatuca Eboronum, attested during the Gallic Wars (58–50 BC), was the stronghold of the Eburones. The other one, Atuatuca Tungrorum (modern Tongeren), founded around 10 BC, was the Roman-era capital of the Civitas Tungrorum, inhabited by the Tungri.

== Name ==
=== Attestations ===
==== Atuatuca Eburonum ====
The place name Atuatuca is first mentioned in the mid-first century BC by Julius Caesar to designate the stronghold of the Eburones: "...he [Caesar] concentrated the baggage of all the legions at Aduatuca. That is the name of a fort (castellum) situated almost in the middle of the territory of the Eburones."

Whether Atuatuca or Aduatuca is the original form is uncertain. In the earliest surviving manuscript of Caesar's Gallic War, dated to the early 9th c. AD, the name is given as Aduatuca. The reason for the spelling variation has been debated. Maurits Gysseling has proposed that Atuatuca was the original form, which later gave way to Aduatuca under the influence of Romance languages. Lauran Toorians argues on the contrary that the original Gaulish prefix ad- was changed to at- as the result of a hypercorrection by medieval copyists, who may have thought that the ad- form had emerged under the influence of the Old French phonology during the first millennium AD.

==== Atuatuca Tungrorum ====
The ancient name of the city of Tongeren, founded ex-nihilo by the Romans around 10 BC, is rendered as Atuatuca Tungrorum on the basis of written sources from the beginning of the Common Era: the settlement is known as Atouatoukon ca. 170 AD (Ptolemy), Tungri in the late 4th c. AD (Ammianus Marcellinus), civitas Tungrorum (Notitia Galliarum), Aduaga Tungrorum (Antonine Itinerary), and as Atuaca (Tabula Peutingeriana).

=== Etymology ===
The meaning of the name Atuatuca remains unclear. According to Xavier Delamarre, it may be formed with the Gaulish suffix ad- ('towards') attached to the stem uātu- ('Vāti, soothsayer, seer, prophet') and the suffix -cā (most likely a feminine variant of -āco-, denoting the provenance or localization). An original Gaulish form *ad-uātu-cā ('place of the soothsayer, where one goes to prophesy') has thus been proposed.

The meaning 'the fortress' has also been postulated by Alfred Holder in 1896, by reconstructing the name in Gaulish as *ad-uatucā and comparing the second element to the Old Irish faidche ('the free place, the field near a dún [fortress]' < *uaticiā). This proposition has been debated as linguistically untenable in recent scholarship.

The name Atuatuci, borne by a Gallic-Germanic tribe dwelling near the Eburones, is linguistically related to the place name Atuatuca, although the settlement cannot be historically linked to the tribe with certainty. Willy Vanvinckenroye has argued that the Eburones did not have their own strongholds and used instead the fortress of the Atuatuci to house troops since they were tributary to them.

== Geography ==
=== Atuatuca Eburonum ===
The exact location of Eburonean stronghold remains uncertain, but it is almost certainly not the same as Tungrorum since no evidence of human settlement before the end of the first century BC have been found there. The location of the stronghold has been highly debated among scholars since the middle of the 20th century. In the words of Edith Wightman, "changes which took place after Caesar, involving new folk from across the Rhine and reorganization of existing peoples, make localization difficult."

Caesar describes Atuatuca as a castellum ('fort, stronghold, shelter') located in the middle of the Eburonean territory, between the Meuse and the Rhine rivers. However, one cannot exclude a location west of the Meuse, since Caesar also states that the land of the Eburones bordered on that of the Menapii, and that there were Eburones living close to the "Ocean", which may suggest that a number of them lived west of this river.

Vanvinckenroye has proposed the plateau of Caster at Kanne, situated between the Meuse and the Jeker river, around 15 km east of Tongeren, as the most likely place for the Eburonean stronghold. An excavation of the place revealed that fortifications had twice been made in the 1st century BC. This may explain why the old name of the central place of the Eburones, Atuatuca, was adopted by the newly founded Roman civitas of the Tungri, Atuatuca Tungrorum, located nearby.

=== Atuatuca Tungrorum ===
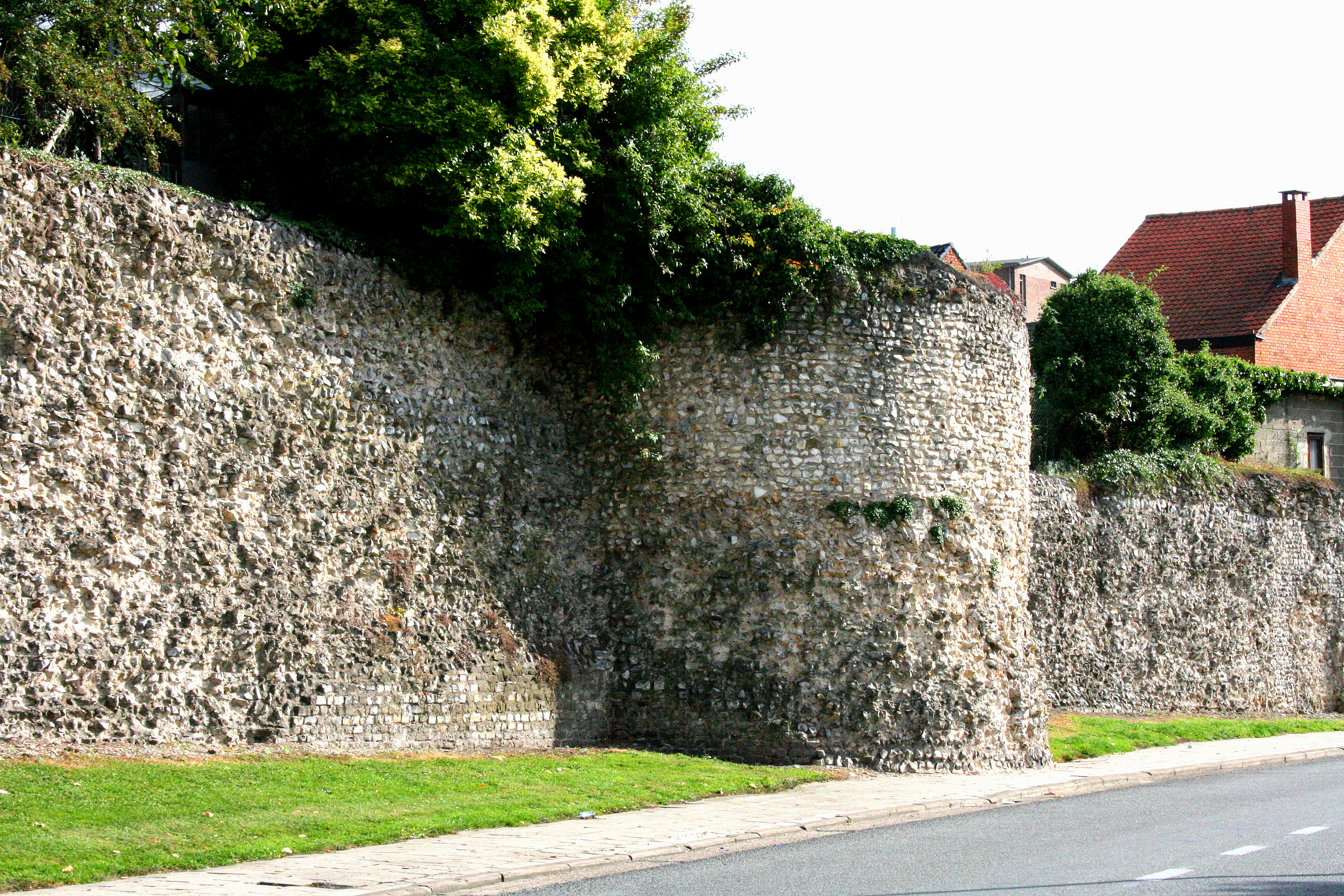
Roman city wall at Atuatuca Tungrorum, modern Tongeren (Belgium).

The Roman-era Atuatuca Tungrorum was located in the Jeker valley, between the Scheldt and the Meuse basins. The settlement is estimated to have reached 60ha during the pre-Flavian era, around 100ha in the 2nd and 3rd centuries AD, then around 50ha during the 4th and 5th centuries.

A first wall, dated to the mid-2nd century AD, had a perimeter of 4,544 m, and a second, built in the early 4th century, had a perimeter of 2,604m and a thickness of 3.20m. Horrea were located southwest of Tungrorum, just outside the first wall, and depended on the Roman army rather than on the city.

== History ==
=== Atuatuca Eburonum ===
Atuatuca Eboronum was besieged by the armies of Julius Caesar during the revolt of Ambrorix in the winter of 54–53 BC. The stronghold also played an important role in Caesar's subsequent attempts to annihilate the tribe in 53 and 51 BC.

=== Atuatuca Tungrorum ===
Atuatuca Tungrorum was founded around ca. 10 BC as a Roman military base. The city appears to be an ex-nihilo Roman creation, since there are no trace of Iron Age settlement. According to the traditional view, the camp was abandoned under Tiberius (14–37 AD), then civilians from the neighbouring canabae took possession of the base, which ultimately became the capital of the Tungrian civitas. A more recent theory, proposed by Vanderhoeven, states that the Romans actually designated it as the capital as early as 10 BC. Shortly after its the creation, elements of the local population may have settled in the new town. The second generation then replaced the native 'state houses' with Romanized courtyard houses, at a period when the Roman armies had left for a long time.

Three different fires, evidenced by archaeological findings, led to the quasi-destruction of the settlement: a first one, traditionally linked to the Batavian revolt (69–70), a second dated the mid-2nd century (of unknown cause), and a third from the 3rd century (also of unknown cause, perhaps linked to Frankish invasions).

Although Ammianus Marcellinus still described Tungrorum as a "wealthy and populous" city by the late 4th century AD, the settlement entered into a slow decline during the 4th and 5th centuries, in a context of insecurity caused by Germanic migrations from the other side of the Rhine, and due to changes in regional and inter-regional trade. From the early 4th century onward, a new outer wall surrounded the city. Since Tungrorum was located on the route linking Boulogne to Cologne, the decline of road transportation in favour of rivers during this period led to the rise of the neighbouring Maastricht, washed by the Meuse river. This shift of regional power is symbolized by the fact that Servatius (d. 384), a bishop of Tungrorum, was buried in Maastricht.

== Debates ==
Apart from later mentions of this placename which clearly refer to Tongeren, Caesar's commentaries on his wars in Gaul are the only surviving source of information. His first mention of "Aduatuca" by name, during discussion of his suppression of an Eburone rebellion, and subsequent involvement by Sigambri from Germany, says that it "is the name of a fort. [Id castelli nomen est. This could also mean it is the name for a fort.] This is nearly in the middle of the Eburones, where Titurius and Aurunculeius had been quartered for the purpose of wintering." He was referring to earlier sections of the commentaries where Q. Titurius Sabinus and L. Aurunculeius Cotta were slain during the start of this rebellion of the Eburones. These two lieutenants of Caesar had been ordered to winter amongst the Eburones after a drought year, which was a cause of the rebellion, although Aduatuca had not been named in the earlier discussion.

Unfortunately, although Caesar says the fort was in the middle of the territory of the Eburones, there is no consensus on the boundaries of the Eburone territory. At one point Caesar says that the chief part of the territory of the Eburones was between the Mosa (Maas or Meuse) and the Rhine. But it is generally agreed that the Eburone territory also included land between the Scheldt and the Maas, including all or most of the low-lying "Campine".

Caesar described the surrounding area as a place where the Eburones were able to disperse dangerously; some, including the Eburone leader Ambiorix, apparently into remote parts of the Ardennes, and others towards tidal islands in the Ocean. There was "no regular army, nor a town, nor a garrison which could defend itself by arms; but the people were scattered in all directions. Where either a hidden valley, or a woody spot, or a difficult morass furnished any hope of protection or of security to any one, there he had fixed himself".

Several arguments have been given for interpreting the name Atuatuca to mean fortress, and not to be the same as Tongeren.

- Caesar's remark mentioned above, id castelli nomen est, can be interpreted not only to mean "that is the name of a fort", but also alternatively "this is the name for a fort".
- A neighbouring tribe, whose settlements are not named, are called the Atuatuci, and had settled and defended themselves from a strongly fortified settlement (which is not named by Caesar). Their name, "Aduatuci" has therefore been interpreted as "fortress people".
- The site of Tongeren, the later Atuatuca of the region, has given no strong archaeological evidence of having been occupied before the Romans established it along their important military route between Bavay and Cologne.
- The geography of Tongeren, while hilly, is not as hilly as Caesar seems to describe. What he describes appears to be more typical of regions to the south of Tongeren, towards the Ardennes in modern Wallonia. Wightman remarks that the "only topographical detail" concerning the Atuatuca of the Eburones was a "narrow defile suitable for ambush" not too far to the west. But this "is too common a feature of the Ardennes landscape to be of assistance".

Apart from Tongeren, proposals concerning the location of this earlier Atuatuca of the Eburones include the small village of Berg, just outside Tongeren, Spa (at a place called Balmoral) and Caestert at the place Kanne, just south of Maastricht, and reasonably close to Tongeren. Dendrochronological evidence was once thought to count against this proposal, but more recent review of the evidence has reinvigorated the idea.

Other proposed sites in the nearby Liège Province include Battice, Limbourg, Dolembreux, northeast of Esneux and Chaudfontaine; as well as Thuin, in Hainaut province. In Germany, Atsch in Stolberg, near Aachen, as well as the Ichenberg hill near Eschweiler have also been proposed.

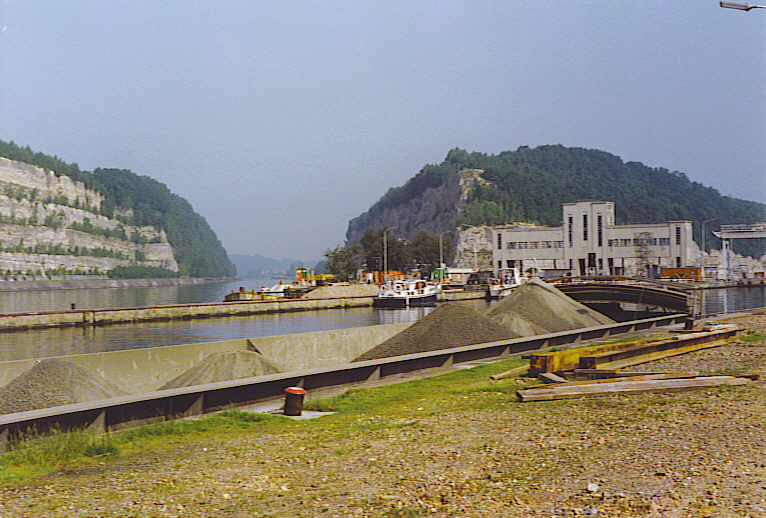
The plateau of Caestert looking northwest, from just south of Maastricht, north of Visé near the point where Wallonia, Flanders and the Netherlands meet. Caestert is on a ridge called Mount Saint Peter. Today this ridge is split by the modern Albert Canal, which runs just south of the Caestert archaeological site upon the ridge.
