= Indutiomarus =

Gallic prince, died 53 BC in Gallic Wars

- Born: c. 1st century BC
- Died: 53 BC
- Occupation: Aristocrat
- Known for: Leading aristocrat of the Treveri
- Relatives: Cingetorix (son-in-law)
- Military career
- Conflicts: Gallic Wars †

Indutiomarus (died 53 BC) was a leading aristocrat of the Treveri (the people of the area around present-day Trier) at the time of Julius Caesar's conquest of Gaul. He was the head of the anti-Roman party and the political rival of his pro-Roman son-in-law Cingetorix for "supreme power" in the state.

== Biography ==
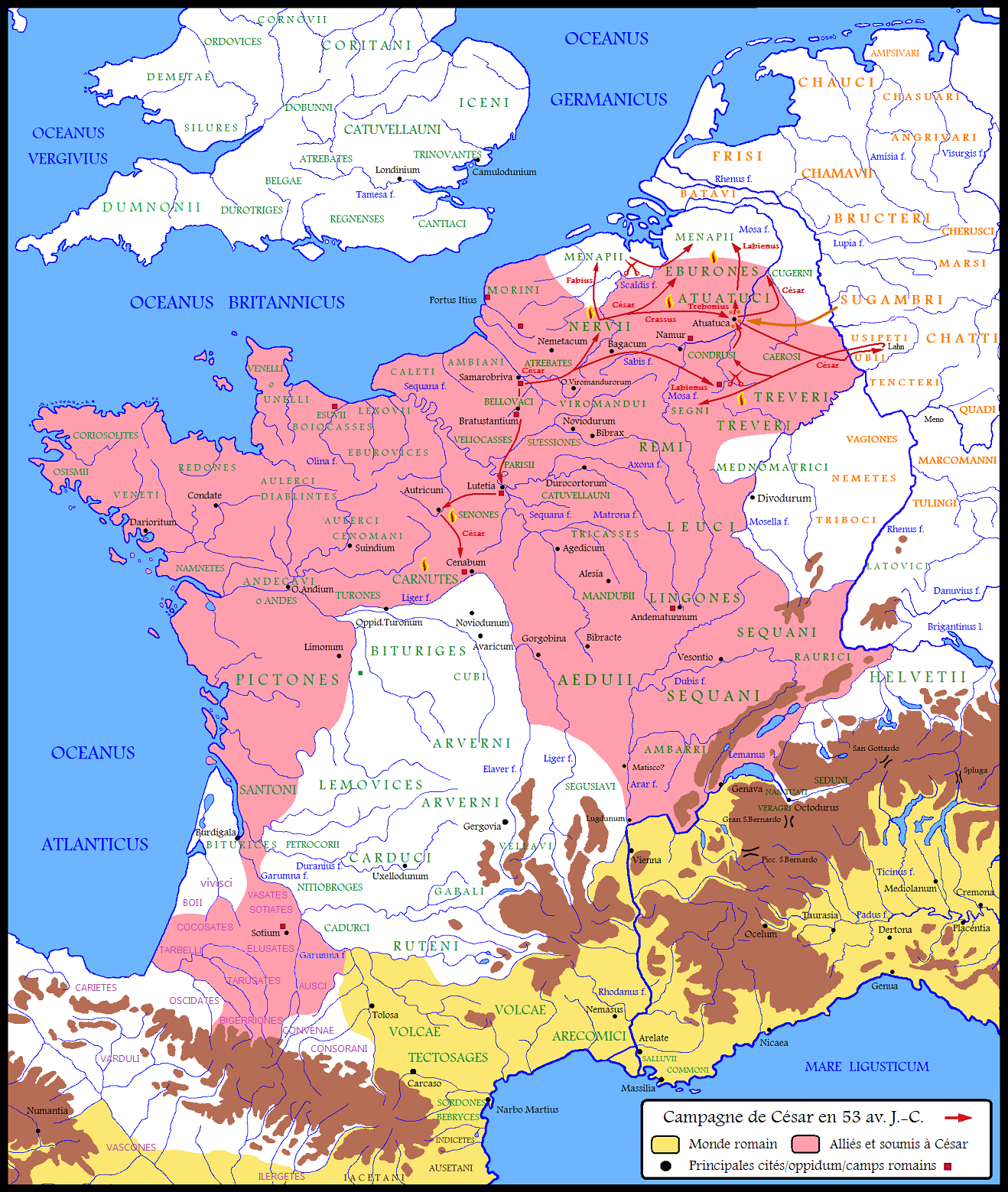
Campaign map of 53 BC. Revolting tribes are shown with flame icons. Note Labienus's campaign against the Treveri.

=== Initial loss of power ===
In 54 BC, Indutiomarus made preparations for war against the Romans and evacuated non-combatants to the Ardennes. However, when Caesar arrived in the territory of the Treveri en route to Britain, Indutiomarus was deserted by many of his leading supporters and submitted to Caesar in the hopes of preserving his position. Caesar accepted his submission, taking 200 hostages including several of Indutiomarus' close family members, but he also took the opportunity to promote Cingetorix to power among the Treveri at Indutiomarus' expense.

=== Belgic revolt (54–53 BC) ===
Deprived of much of his power, Indutiomarus became all the more bitter an enemy of the Romans, and waited for a favorable opportunity to take his revenge which arrived in the winter later that year. To ensure adequate food supplies, Caesar had separated his troops into winter quarters dispersed in different parts of Gaul. Indutiomarus encouraged Ambiorix and Cativolcus, chiefs of the Eburones, to attack the Roman legion stationed in their country. He himself soon afterwards marched against Titus Labienus, who was encamped among the Remi, immediately west of the Treveri. Forewarned of Caesar's victory over the Nervii, Indutiomarus withdrew his forces into Treveran country and raised fresh troops. He also spent the winter sending ambassadors to the Germans in search of allies. Other peoples began sending ambassadors to Indutiomarus of their own accord as well – these included the Senones, the Carnutes, the Nervii and the Aduatuci.

Now emboldened, Indutiomarus declared Cingetorix an enemy of the state and confiscated his property. He marched against Labienus again and surrounded the Roman camp. Indutiomarus took to riding around the camp with his cavalry force almost daily, both to reconnoitre and to intimidate the Romans within. Labienus snuck a large contingent of auxiliary cavalry into the Roman camp, and during one of these exercises the auxiliaries surprised the Treveran force with a sudden sally. Indutiomarus himself was killed in the rout while crossing a river.

== Sources ==
- C. Julius Caesar (c. 52 BC), De Bello Gallico.
- Cassius Dio (c. 229 CE), Roman History.
