= Ambiorix =

Eburonian king

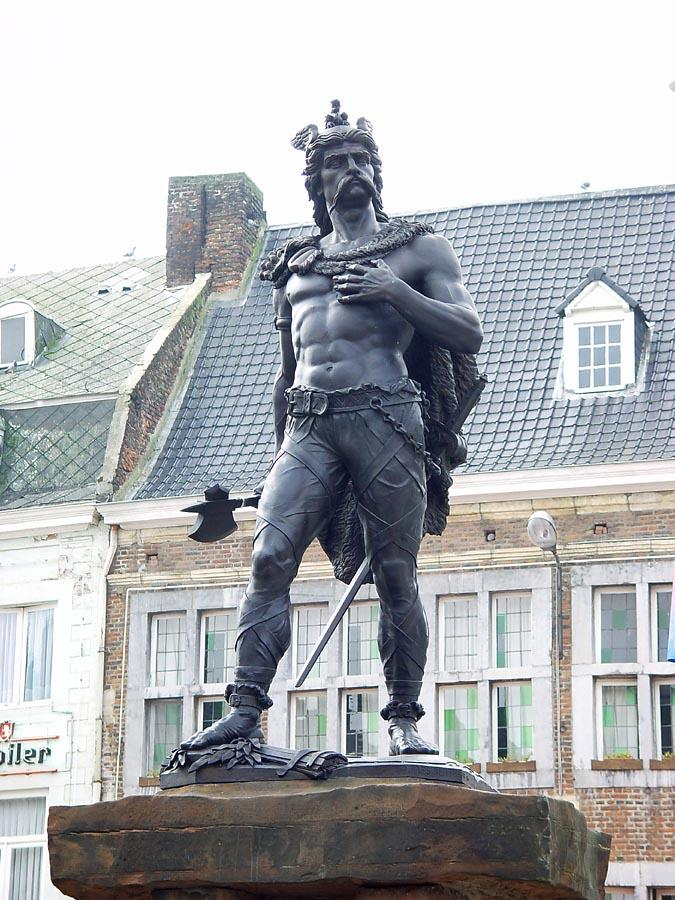
- Statue of Ambiorix in Tongeren, Belgium.

King of the Eburones
- In office ?? BC – 53 BC Serving with Cativolcus

Personal details
- Born: c. 1st century BC Belgic confederation
- Military career
- Allegiance: Eburones
- Conflicts: Gallic Wars; Ambiorix's revolt

Ambiorix (Gaulish "king of the surroundings", or "king-protector") (fl. 54–53 BC) was, together with Cativolcus, prince of the Eburones, leader of a Belgic tribe of north-eastern Gaul (Gallia Belgica), where modern Belgium is located. In the 19th century, Ambiorix became a Belgian national hero because of his resistance against Julius Caesar, as written in Caesar's Commentarii de Bello Gallico.

== Name ==
It is generally accepted that Ambiorix is a Gaulish personal name formed with the prefix ambio- attached to rix ('king'), but the meaning of the first element is debated. Some scholars translate Ambiorix as the 'king of the surroundings' or 'king of the enclosure', by interpreting ambio- as a thematized form of ambi- ('around, on both sides') meaning 'surroundings' or else 'enclosure' (cf. Old Irish imbe 'enclosure'). Alternatively, Fredrik Otto Lindeman renders Ambiorix as the 'protector-king', by deriving ambio- from the Proto-Indo-European compound *h₂mbhí-péh₂ ('protector'; cf. Old Indic adhi-pá- 'protector, ruler, master, king').

== Biography ==
=== Early history ===
In 57 BCE, Julius Caesar conquered parts of Gaul and also Belgica (Belgium, modern-day Northern France, Luxembourg, part of present-day Netherlands below the Rhine River; and the north-western portion of North Rhine-Westphalia, Germany). There were several tribes in the country who fought against each other frequently. The Eburones were ruled by Ambiorix and Catuvolcus. In 54 BCE, Caesar's troops urgently needed more food, and so the local tribes were forced to give up part of their harvest, which had not been good that year. Understandably, the starving Eburones were reluctant to do so and Caesar ordered that camps be built near the Eburones' villages. Each centurion was ordered to make sure the food supplies were delivered to the Roman soldiers. This created resentment among the Eburones.

Although Julius Caesar had freed him from paying tribute to the Atuatuci, Ambiorix joined Catuvolcus in the winter of 54 BCE in an uprising against the Roman forces under Quintus Titurius Sabinus and Lucius Aurunculeius Cotta.

=== Resisting the Romans ===
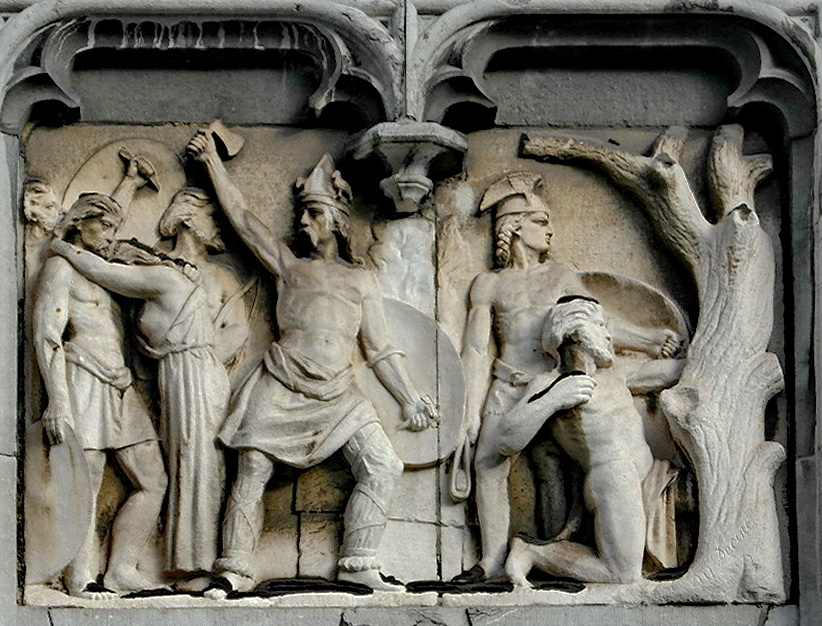
Ambiorix attacking Roman soldiers, relief at the Liège Provincial Palace

Because a drought had disrupted his grain supply, Caesar was forced to winter his legions among the rebellious Belgic tribes. Roman troops led by Sabinus and Cotta were wintering among the Eburones when they were attacked by them, led by Ambiorix and Cativolcus. Ambiorix deceived the Romans, telling them the attack was made without his consent, and further advised them to flee as a large Germanic force was preparing to cross the Rhine. Trusting Ambiorix, Sabinus and Cotta's troops left the next morning. A short distance from their camp, the Roman troops were ambushed by the Eburones and massacred.

Elsewhere, another Roman force under Quintus Tullius Cicero, younger brother of the orator Marcus, were wintering amongst the Nervii. Leading a coalition of rebellious Belgic tribes, Ambiorix surrounded Cicero's camp. After a long while, a Roman messenger was finally able to slip through the Belgic lines and get word of the uprising to Caesar. Mobilizing his legions, Caesar immediately marched to Cicero's aid. As they approached the besieged Roman camp, the Belgae moved to engage Caesar's troops. Vastly outnumbered, Caesar ordered his troops to appear confused and frightened, and they successfully lured the Belgae to attack them on ground favourable to the Romans. Caesar's forces launched a fierce counterattack, and soon put the Belgae to flight. Later, Caesar's troops entered Cicero's camp to find most of the men wounded.

Meanwhile, Indutiomarus, a leader of the Treveri, began to harass Labienus's camp daily, eventually provoking Labienus to send out his cavalry with specific orders to kill Indutiomarus. They did so, and routed the remnants of Indutiomarus's army. Caesar personally remained in Gaul for the remainder of winter due to the renewed Gallic threat.

=== Caesar's revenge ===
When the Roman Senate became aware of the latest events, Caesar swore to destroy all the Belgic tribes. Ambiorix had killed fifteen cohorts. A Belgic attack on Cicero, then stationed with a legion in the territory of the Nervii, failed due to the timely appearance of Caesar. The Roman campaigns against the Belgae took a few years, but eventually the tribes were slaughtered or driven out and their fields burned. The Eburones disappeared from history after this genocidal event. According to the writer Florus, Ambiorix and his men succeeded in escaping across the Rhine and vanished from history.

== Legacy ==
Caesar wrote about Ambiorix in his commentary about his battles against the Gauls, De Bello Gallico. In this text he also famously wrote: "Of these [three regions], the Belgae are the bravest." ("... Horum omnium fortissimi sunt Belgae ...").

Ambiorix remained a relatively obscure figure until the nineteenth century. The independence of Belgium in 1830 spurred a search for national heroes. In Caesar's De Bello Gallico, Ambiorix and his deeds were rediscovered. In 1841, the Belgian poet Joannes Nolet de Brauwere Van Steeland wrote a lyrical epic about Ambiorix. Furthermore, on 5 September 1866 a statue of Ambiorix was erected on the main market square in Tongeren, Belgium, referred to by Caesar as Atuatuca, i.e. Atuatuca Tungrorum.

Today, Ambiorix is one of the most famous characters in Belgian history. Many companies, bars and friteries have named themselves after him, and in many Belgian comics such as Suske en Wiske and Jommeke he plays a guest role. There was also a short-lived comic called Ambionix, which featured a scientist teleporting a Belgic chief, loosely based on Ambiorix, to modern-day Belgium.
