= Colonia Ulpia Traiana =

Roman city located in modern Xanten, Germany

- Castra Vetera; Roman-German civilian settlement
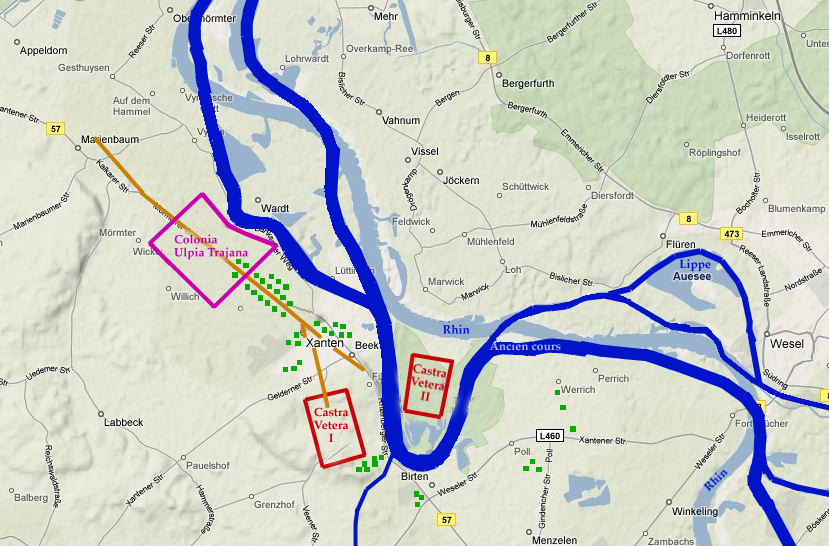
- Colonia Ulpia Traiana (with Castra Vetera I & II) was created near the old course of the Rhine river (dark blue color)

- Location within Germany
- 51°39′44″N 06°27′14″E
- Location: Xanten, Germany

History
- Founded: ca. 13 BC (Vetera I); 110 AD: colonia
- Built: (Augustus: Vetera I & II) Trajan
- Abandoned: ca 440 AD

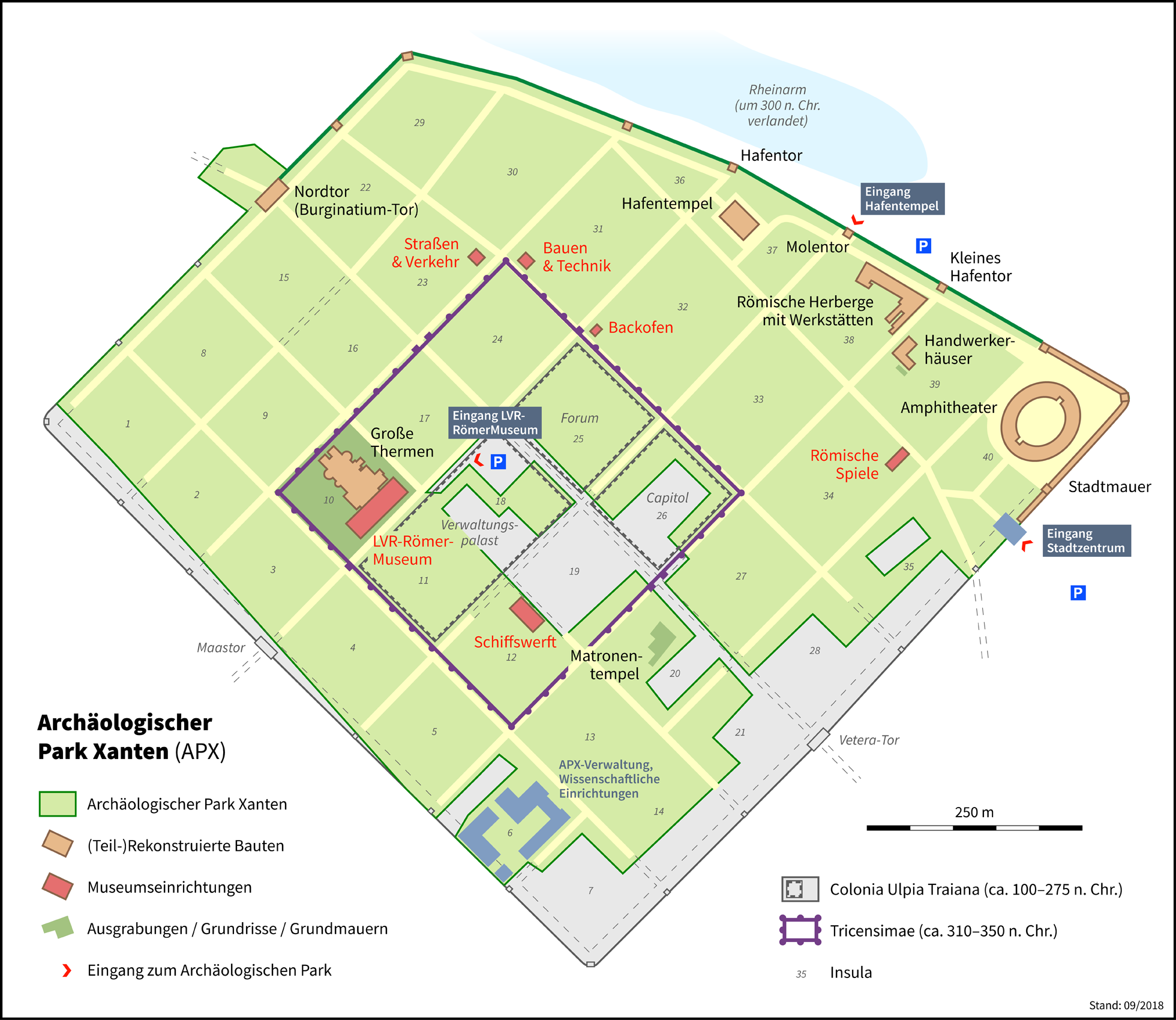
Map of Colonia Ulpia Traiana in the present-day Archaeological Park Xanten (as of 2018); the late antique fortification is marked by a black line

The Colonia Ulpia Traiana (CUT) was a Roman city (colonia) located in the area of present-day Xanten, North Rhine-Westphalia, Germany. It existed approximately from 100 to 275 CE and was a major center of the province of Germania Inferior. Today, the site is occupied by the Xanten Archeology Park and the LVR-RömerMuseum. The archaeological remains are gradually being excavated and studied.

The Colonia Ulpia Traiana was founded by Emperor Trajan and named after him. As a colonia, it was one of approximately 150 cities in the Roman Empire that held this legal status, granting its inhabitants Roman citizenship and serving as a "miniature Rome." Ulpia Traiana was the third-largest Roman city in present-day Germany, after Colonia Claudia Ara Agrippinensium (modern Cologne) and Augusta Treverorum (modern Trier). Its public buildings reflected the city's high status as a central hub for the surrounding region.

== Pre-Colonia settlements ==
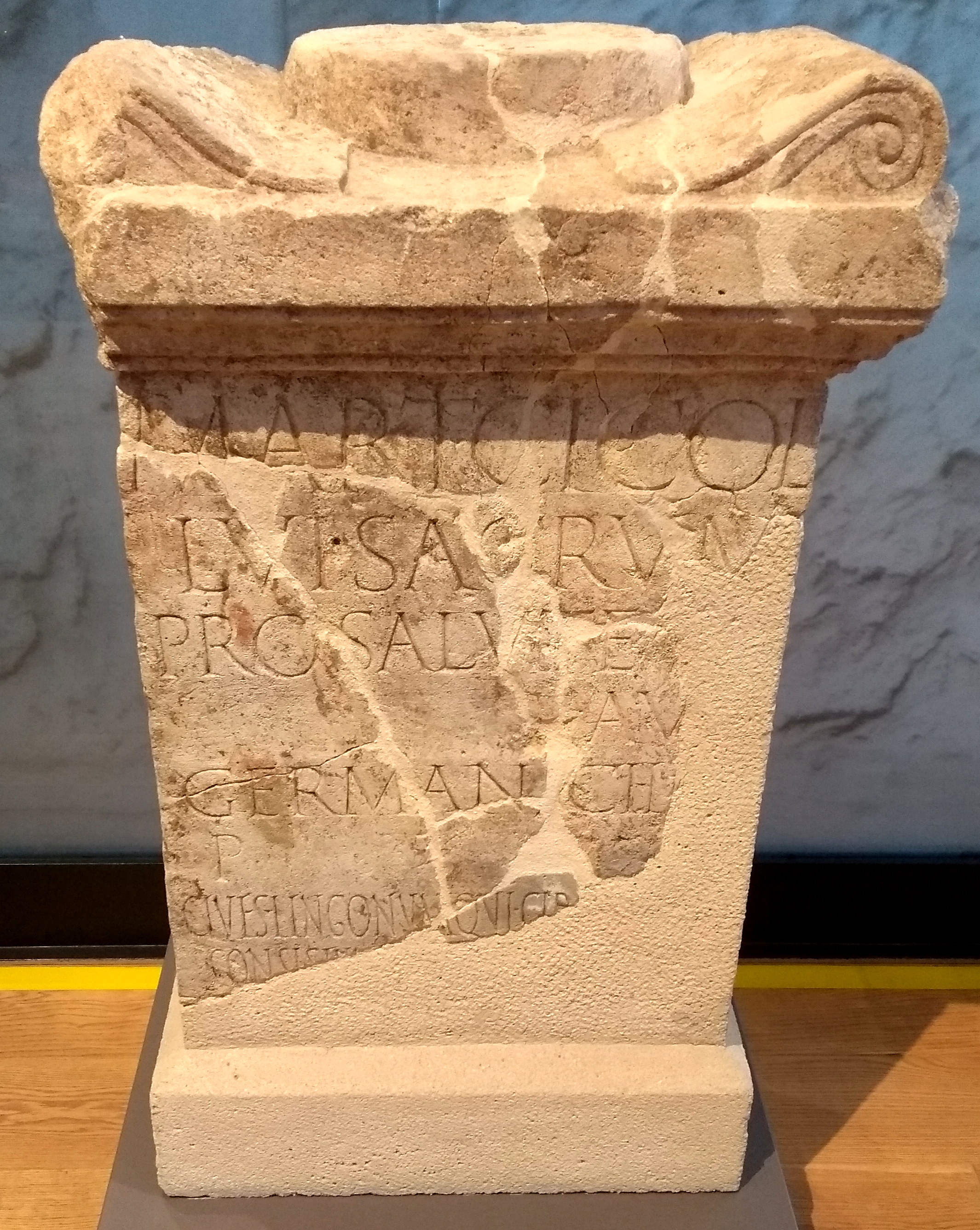
Preserved fragments of the Mars-Cicollus dedicatory stone in the LVR-RömerMuseum Xanten, with remnants of the Cugerner settlement's name at the right end of the penultimate preserved line

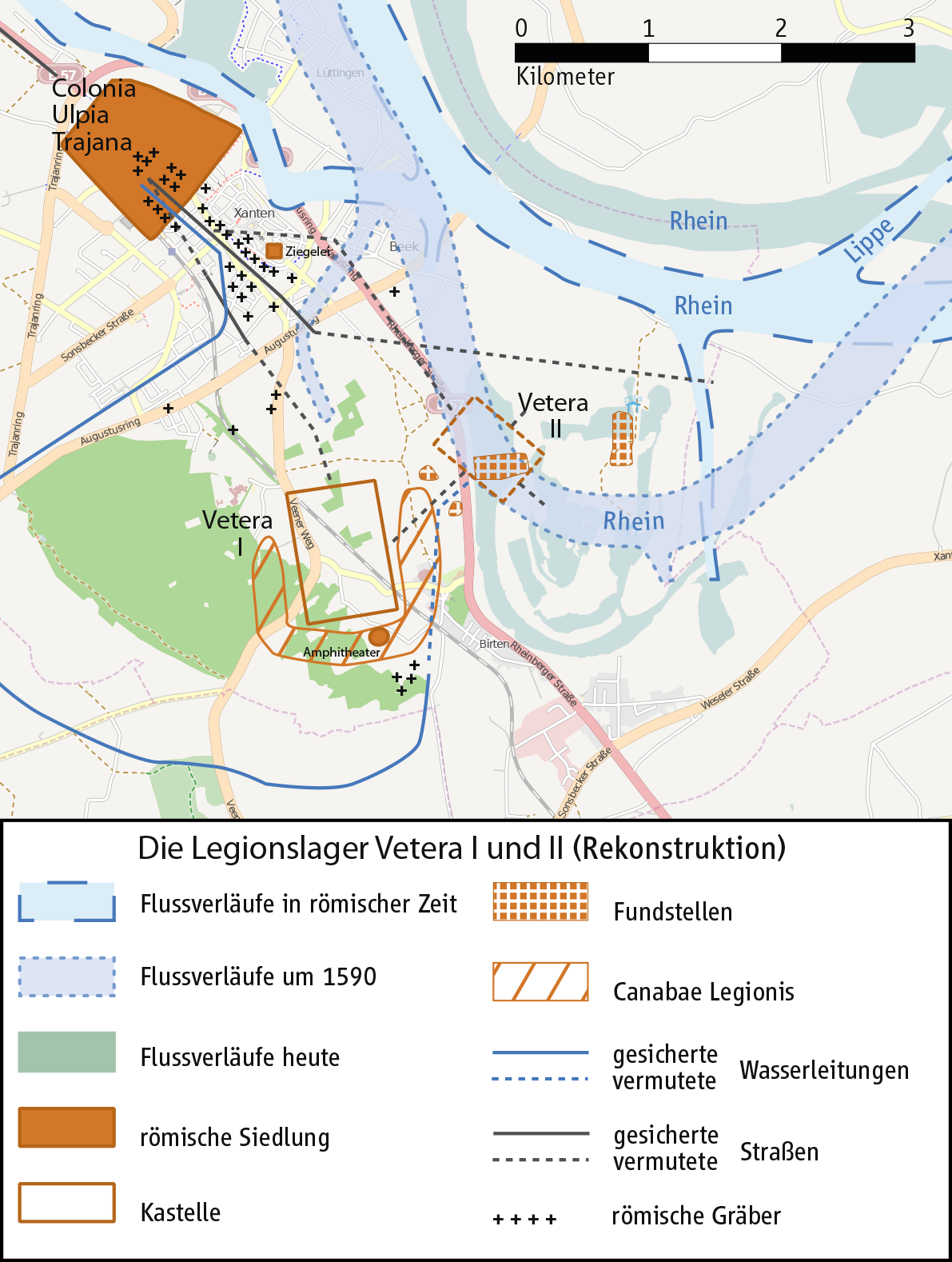
Area around present-day Xanten with the Colonia Ulpia Traiana and the two Vetera I and II forts

Archaeological evidence traces the origins of the settlement back to the 4th century BCE. Additional finds date to the 3rd century BCE, but there is no evidence of continuous occupation in the 2nd and 1st centuries BCE. In 13/12 BCE, the Roman general Drusus established the legionary camp Vetera on the nearby Fürstenberg, which served as a base for campaigns into the right-bank Germanic territories (Drusus' campaigns). After a victorious campaign in 8 BCE, Drusus resettled 40,000 Germans, primarily Sugambri, to the left bank of the Rhine. He controlled the Rhine river: it was mainly a fluvial fleet, although it also operated in the North Sea. After 30 AD, the fleet moved its main base to the castrum of Alteburg, some 4 km south of Colonia Claudia Ara Agrippinensium (modern Cologne). These Germans, now known as Cugerni, formed the population of the settlement that would later become the Colonia Ulpia Traiana.

The name of this pre-colonia settlement is not recorded. One hypothesis suggests it was called Cugernorum, analogous to the Batavian capital Batavorum (modern Nijmegen). A clue to the possible name comes from a fragmentary votive inscription to Mars Cicollus from the 60s CE, which likely preserves the first three letters of the place name (read as "Cib," "Cip," "Cir," "Gib," "Gip," or "Gir"). Julianus Egidius Bogaers proposed reconstructing this as "Cibernodurum," derived from the tribal name of the Cugerni (also spelled Cuberni).

Due to its proximity to Vetera I, Cugernorum/Cibernodurum developed into a relatively prosperous trading center within a few years. However, it likely shared the fate of Vetera during the Batavian Revolt of 70 CE, when it was probably burned down. Evidence includes a burn layer in the eastern part of the later colonia, where the Mars-Cicollus altar, apparently deliberately smashed in antiquity, was found. With the reestablishment of the military camp Vetera II in 71 CE, the settlement was also rebuilt. It featured a well-developed harbor and consisted mainly of timber-framed houses made from local materials.

== Colonia Ulpia Traiana ==
Around 100 CE, Emperor Trajan elevated the settlement to the status of a colonia, naming it Colonia Ulpia Traiana after his full name, Marcus Ulpius Traianus. Initial construction included (at least partial) erection of the city wall and the expansion of the existing street grid in a rectangular pattern (Hippodamian plan). Major new constructions within the city are only documented from the reign of Emperor Hadrian (117–138 CE), leaving it unclear whether Trajan's founding involved demolishing existing settlement structures. In the following decades, the colonia was equipped with aqueducts, a sewer system, temples (notably the Capitoline of Colonia Ulpia Traiana) , a forum, and an amphitheater. Previously undeveloped areas were also built up, leading to the discovery of graves within the colonia, despite cemeteries typically being located outside Roman settlements. Within its walls, the 73-hectare city housed approximately 10,000 people, consisting of Romanized Gauls and Germans. With the city's elevation, veterans from the legions stationed at Vetera, among other places, received land grants, forming a wealthy resident class.

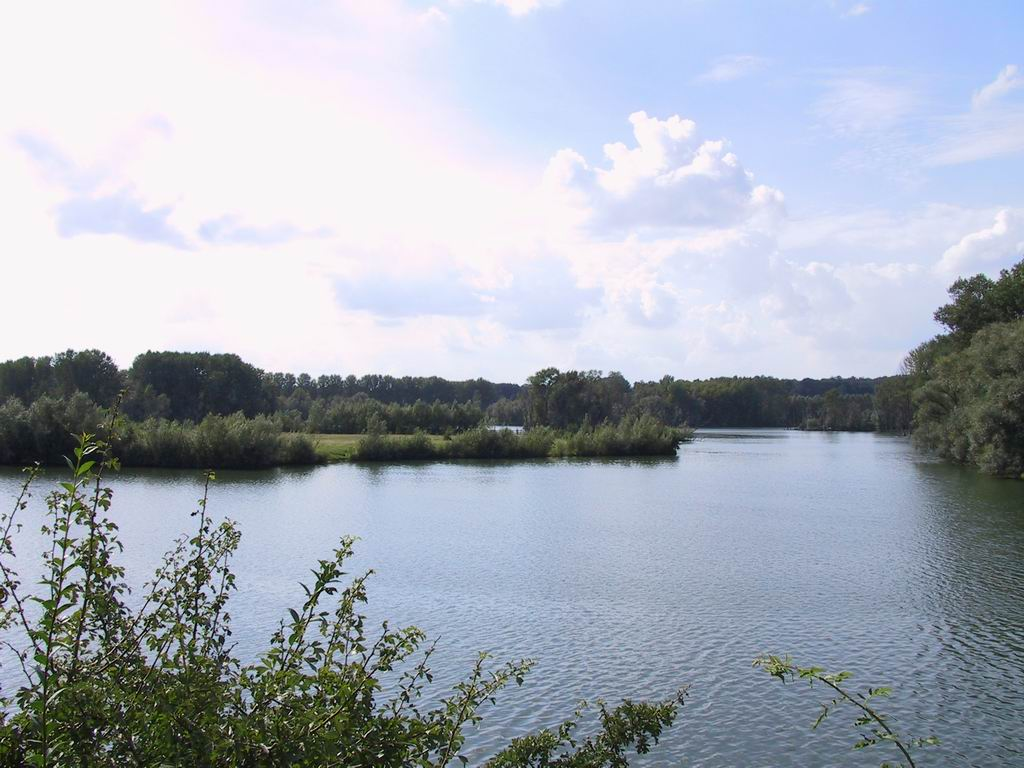
the actual "Bislicher insel", used as a port in Roman times

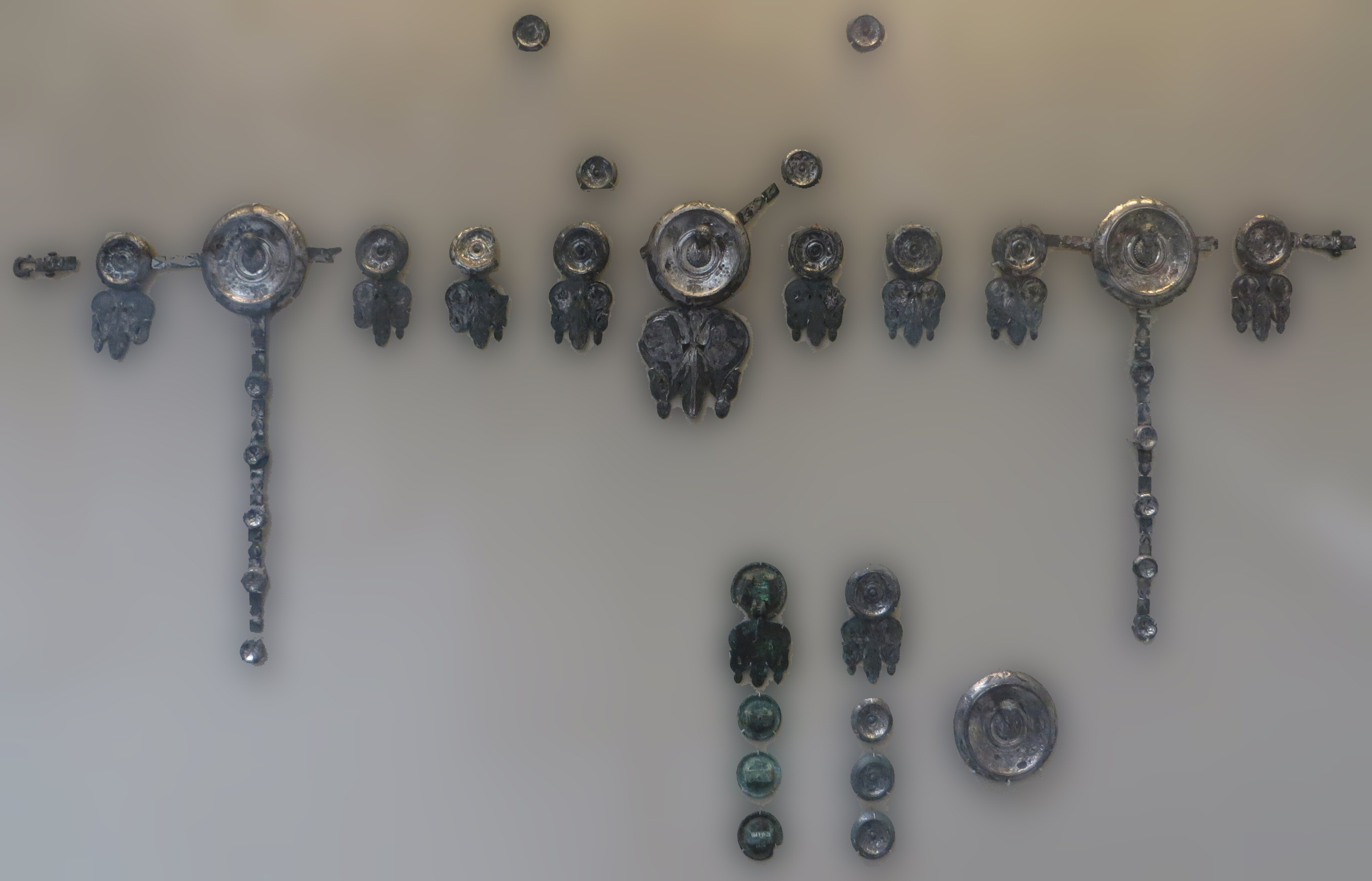
Set of Roman silvered-bronze horse trappings from Colonia Ulpia Traiana

The colonia was a completely new town with a huge defensive wall and other important buildings, like an amphitheater. For this town the old castrum settlement was completely abandoned. The colonia became the second most important commercial post in the province of Germania Inferior, surpassed only by Colonia Agrippinensis (today's Cologne). In 122 AD, Vetera II became the camp of Legio XXX Ulpia Victrix, replacing VI Victrix which had moved to Britannia. Colonia Ulpia Traiana was defended by huge walls 3.4 km long and with 22 towers

During the whole 2nd and the first half of the 3rd century this Roman colony was involved into a continuing process of urbanization and architectural improvement. The Roman Baths were built by Hadrian around 125 AD, with a big Port Temple. But the huge complex of Thermae (that comprised hot, warm and cold baths, changing rooms, and saunas) was destroyed in 275 AD.

Various trades are attested in the city. In 1993, excavations at the harbor uncovered numerous layers of Roman pottery, mostly misfired pieces, indicating a local pottery workshop. Additional pottery waste found under the Matronae sanctuary in Insula 20 confirms local ceramic production in the pre-colonia period. In Insula 39, metalworking workshops were excavated, primarily processing silver.

Archaeological evidence suggests that the settlement of Colonia Ulpia Traiana declined throughout the 3rd century, often linked to Germanic raids in the Germanic and Gallic provinces during this period (Crisis of the Third Century). In the second half of the century, the Rhine arm in front of the city silted up, removing a natural defensive barrier. The only clear archaeological evidence for a possible destruction of the city comes from the fill of a cellar in the Roman inn, where a burnt layer containing a silver coin of Emperor Aurelian (r. 270–275) was found. This has led to the assumption that the historically documented extensive raids by the Franks in 275/276 caused the city's destruction. However, Bernd Liesen and Marcus Reuter concluded from their analysis of the inn's cellar excavations that this single find is insufficient to link the destruction of the entire colonia to the Frankish raids or to confirm a violent destruction of the inn itself.

== Post-Colonia settlement ==
In the late 3rd century, a strong fortification encompassing nine insulae was built in the central areas of the colonia. This was initially dated to around 310 CE, leading to assumptions of a prolonged settlement interruption following the presumed destruction around 275 CE. However, it is now evident that the fortification was likely constructed in the last quarter of the 3rd century. It remains debated whether this settlement can be identified with Tricensimae, a place mentioned in late antique sources and named after the Legio XXX Ulpia Victrix, the main legion of the nearby Vetera II camp since around 120 CE. This raises the question of whether Vetera II was abandoned in the 3rd century, with the remaining legionaries relocating to the new fortification within the Colonia Ulpia Traiana.

In 352 CE, the settlement was captured by the Franks. Rebuilt from 359 CE, it was finally abandoned in the first half of the 5th century.

== Post-Roman era ==
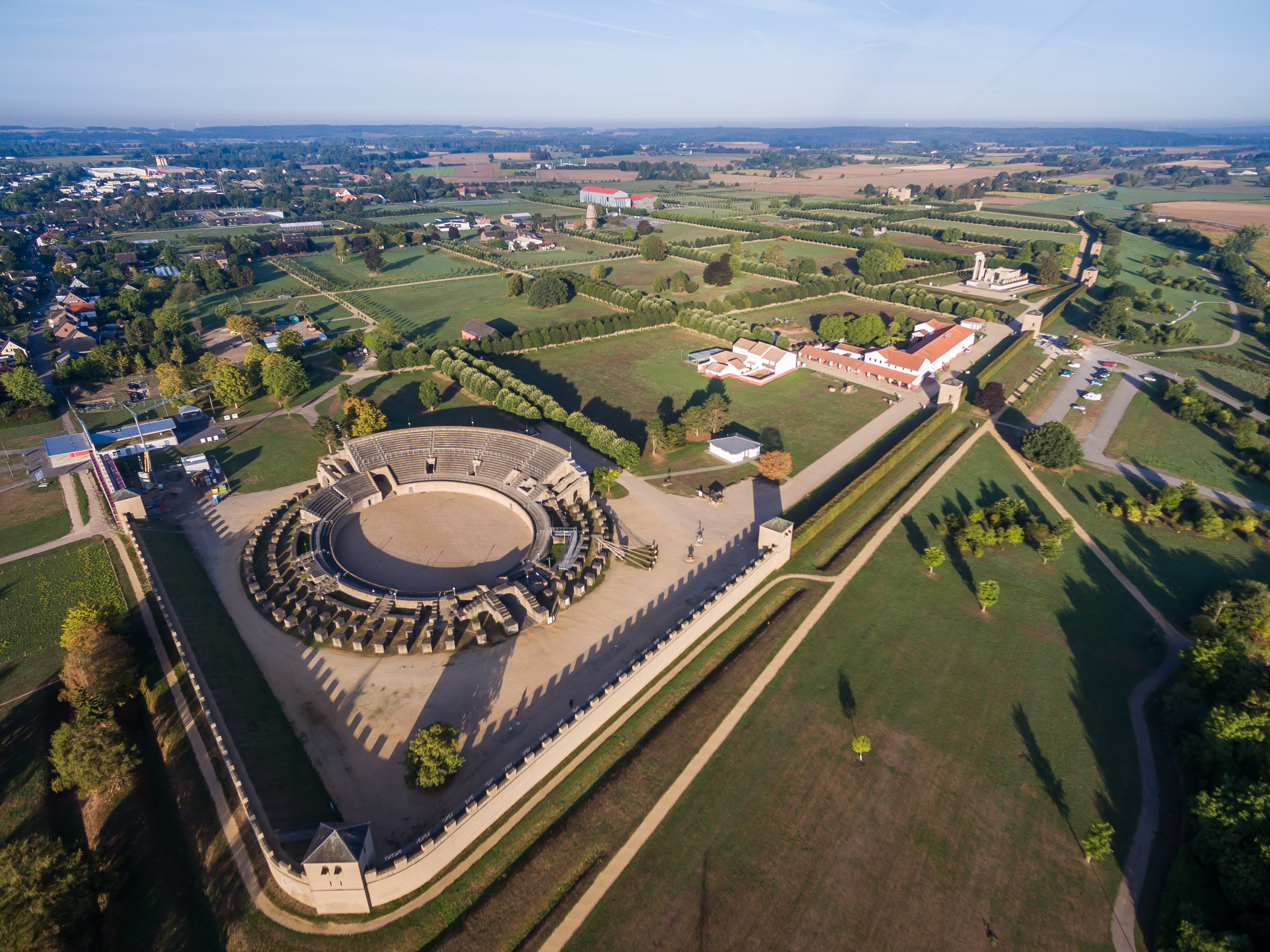
Partial reconstructions of the city wall, amphitheater, and other structures of Colonia Ulpia Traiana in the Archaeological Park Xanten

Around 440 AD the city was definitively abandoned by the Roman Empire, who moved most of the remaining inhabitants to the area of Augusta Treverorum. In the second half of the fifth century, the Franks began to settle in the area (mixing with the small surviving Romanized population), but no urban settlements have been found from this time as the Franks did not build in stone, unlike the Romans.

The buildings initially remained intact, but the decaying colonia increasingly served as a quarry with the onset of medieval construction. Usable materials were repurposed for the construction of the church and the town of Xanten or sold to Holland, causing the Roman city to gradually disappear from the surface. Only the Capitol remained a visible ruin until after 1839. After the stones were cleared and the subsurface searched for more, as evidenced by access holes in the remains of the large baths, the area was converted to farmland.

Since the modern town of Xanten was built on the Roman cemetery, the Roman structures, unlike those in Cologne or Trier, were preserved and only affected by stone quarrying.Systematic excavations began in the 19th century by the Lower Rhine Antiquarian Society, continued in the 1930s during the construction of the Bundesstraße 57, and furthered in the 1950s and 1960s, bringing the Roman city back into focus. From the 1970s, individual buildings were reconstructed as part of the Archaeological Park Xanten, which now encompasses nearly the entire former city.

== Structures ==
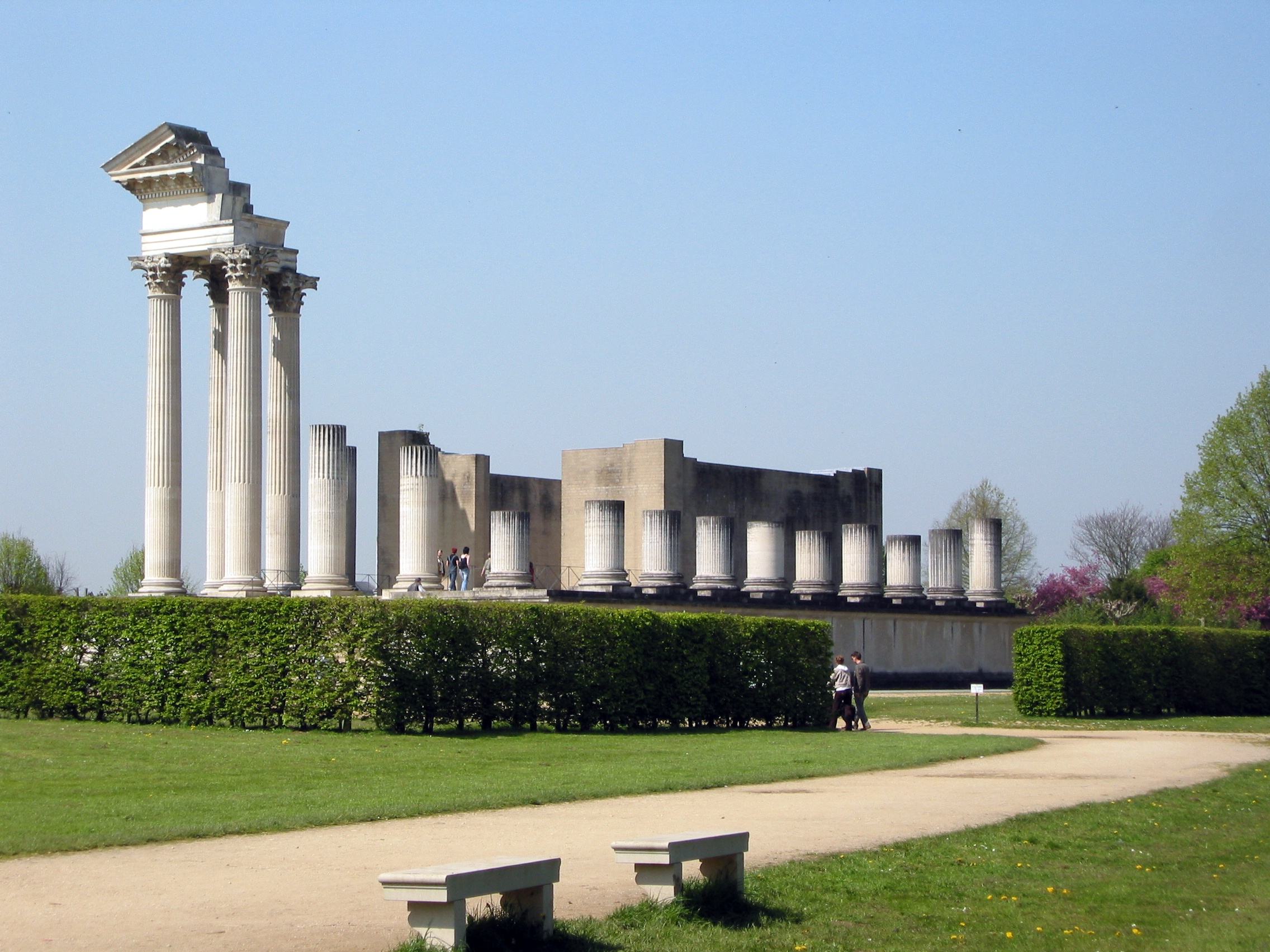
The partially reconstructed Hafentempel in the northeastern city area

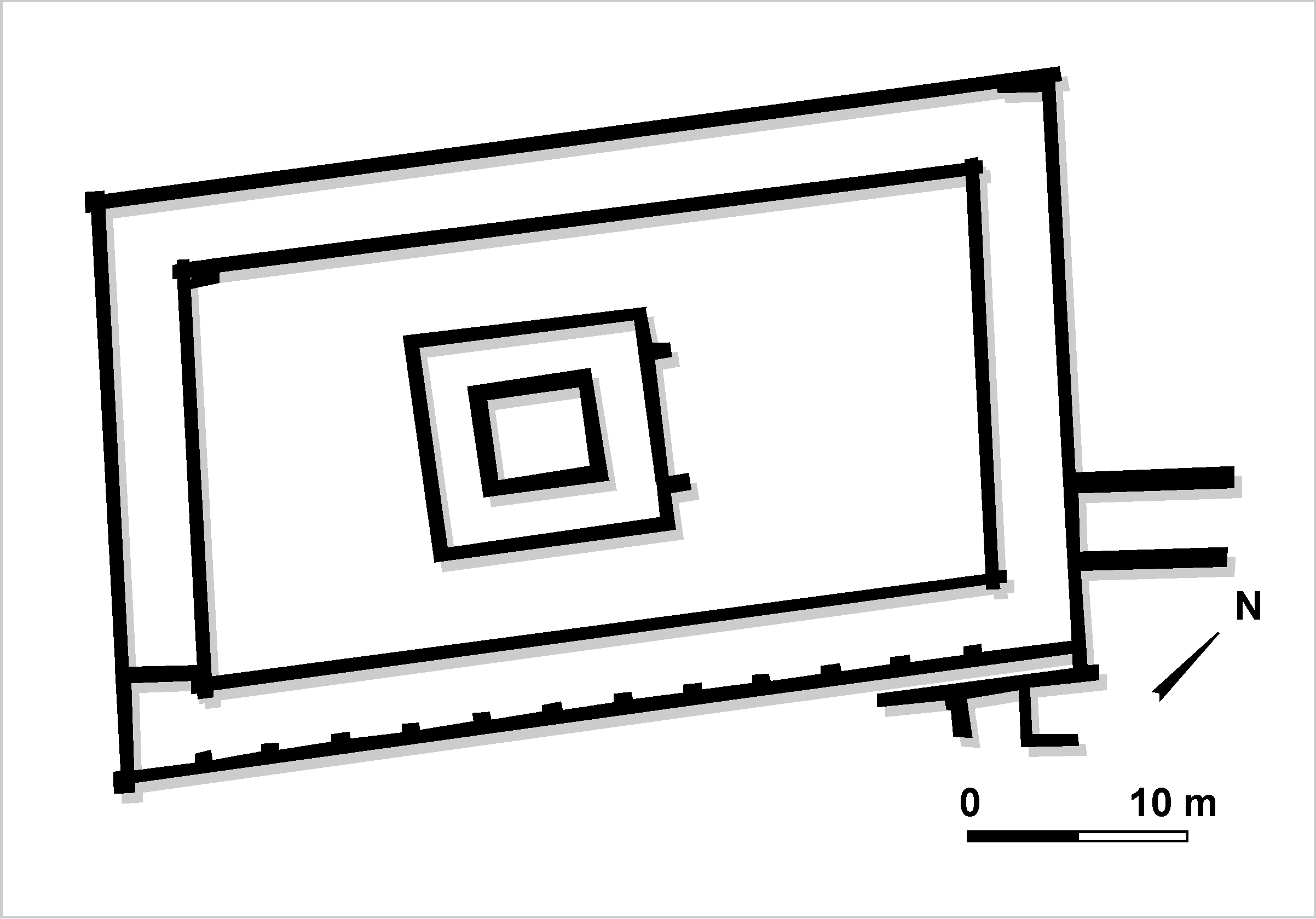
Reconstructed plan of the Matronae Temple as a Gallo-Roman ambulatory temple (the Matronae sanctuary)

The city wall of Colonia Ulpia Traiana enclosed the 73-hectare city over a length of 3.4 km. The settlement was divided into insulae by a grid of perpendicular streets, numbered modernly from 1 to 40. At the city's center (Insula 25) was the forum, occupying an entire insula.

South of the forum, Insula 26 housed the Capitol. Like other major structures of the CUT, it was built in the 2nd century, on an area previously densely packed with houses, some richly decorated with paintings. The Capitol spanned a large district, with the temple oriented northeast toward the Rhine. Only foundations remain, though ruins were visible until the early 19th century, when initial excavations took place.

Northwest of the forum were the thermae, occupying Insula 10. The so-called administrative palace, whose function remains unclear, spanned three insulae (4, 11, and 17) west of the forum. Other significant public buildings included the Amphitheater of Colonia Ulpia Traiana in the southern part of the city (Insula 40) and the large Harbor Temple (Insula 37). A smaller Matronae sanctuary, the Matronae Temple, was excavated within the residential area (Insula 20). In Insula 38, adjacent to the small harbor gate and thus near the harbor, was the inn with its associated baths.

The private residential and commercial insulae were subdivided into parcels, typically measuring about 12 × 44 m. These were mostly strip houses. Some houses were richly decorated with wall paintings, but no evidence of mosaics has been found, nor have atrium or peristyle houses been identified, distinguishing the city from Cologne. In Insula 3, a larger residential building resembling a villa rustica rather than a typical urban house was excavated, over 20 m long with corner risalits facing the courtyard and colonnades along the street front. Some rooms had hypocaust heating. In Insula 19, several residential buildings were excavated, some with high-quality wall paintings, including the so-called Eagle-Gigantomachy Wall.

== Water supply ==
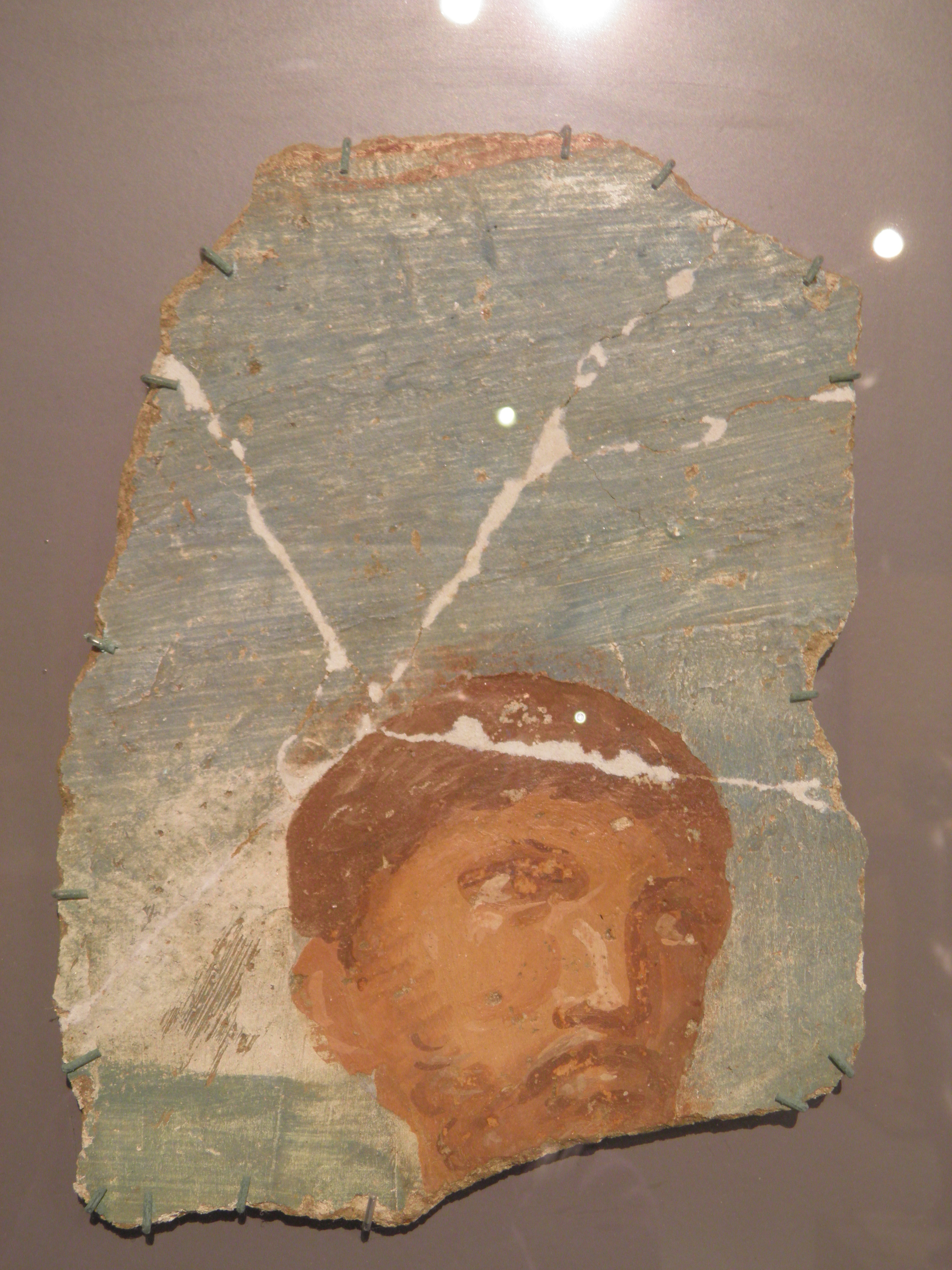
Fragment of a wall painting from Insula 27

The numerous wells found in the CUT area were insufficient to supply a city of this size with adequate drinking and utility water. Remains of water pipelines were discovered in the Xanten area as early as the 19th century and after World War II, but their connections were long unclear. The Hees or the "Sonsbeck Heights" were the only viable water catchment areas.

In 1959, Hermann Hinz discovered a pipeline running from the push moraines of the "Hees" through modern Xanten, along the former cemetery road, reaching the CUT from the south. In 1975, during road construction in the Sonsbeck district of Labbeck, a section of the pipeline was found, designed to channel surface water from the Sonsbeck Heights to the CUT. It consisted of a mortar channel lined with brick rubble, showing traces of typical calcareous sinter. The foundation was solidly built from Eifel greywacke, basalt, and tuff stones. Slate fragments indicated the former covering of the channel, which had a gradient of 20 cm per 100 m. Part of this pipeline was relocated and preserved in the Archaeological Park Xanten.

In May 2007, during dry weather, aerial archaeologist Baoquan Song from the Ruhr University Bochum observed clear vegetation anomalies indicating a row of aqueduct pillars in the so-called "Furth." Further evidence of pipeline sections was found at the Hasenacker Forester's Lodge. Excavations in December 2008 confirmed the aerial images. During construction work at Xanten's marketplace in late 2009, remains of pipeline foundations were discovered.

== Gallery ==
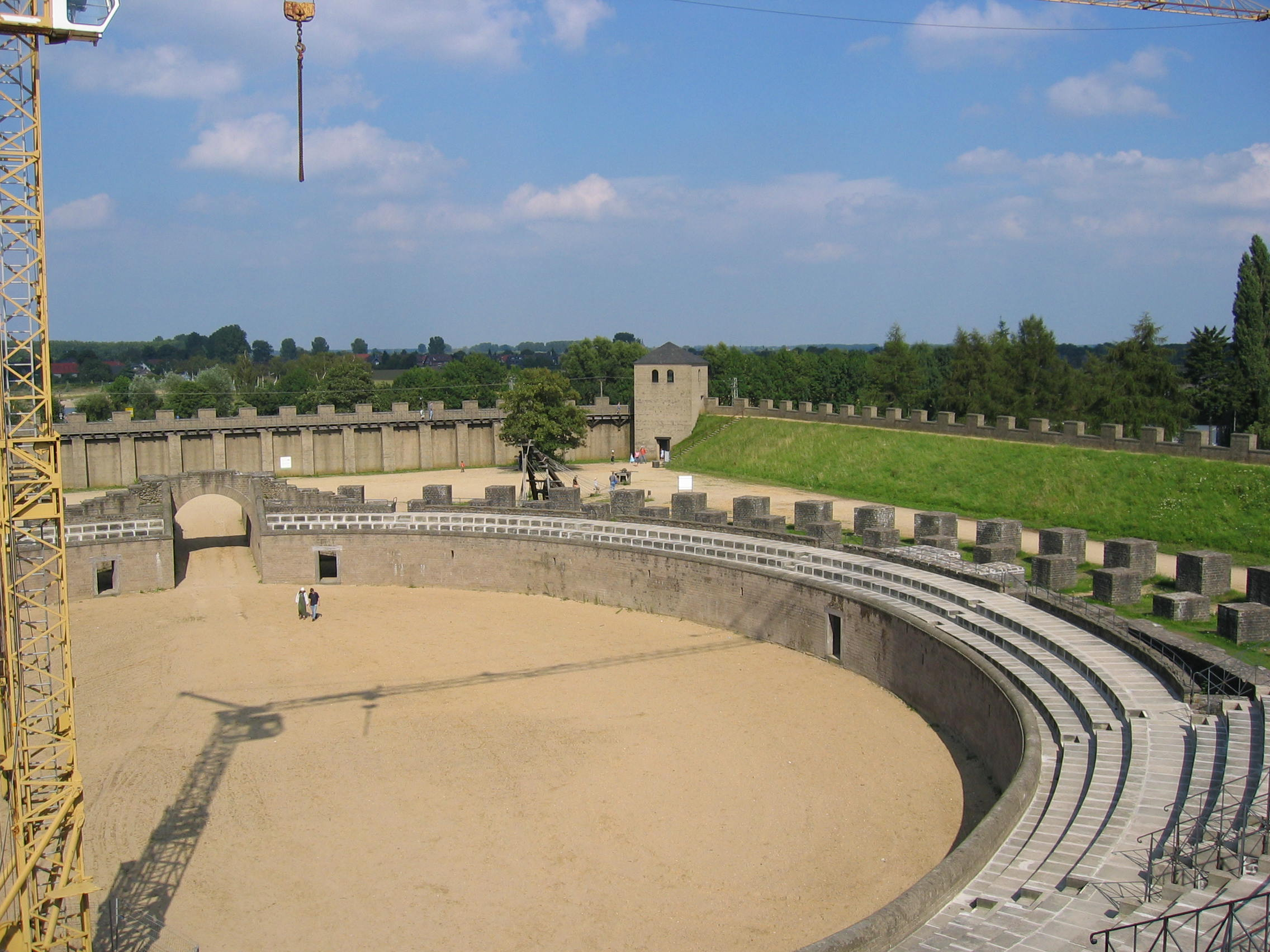
Rebuilt Amphitheater in the "Archaeologischer Park"

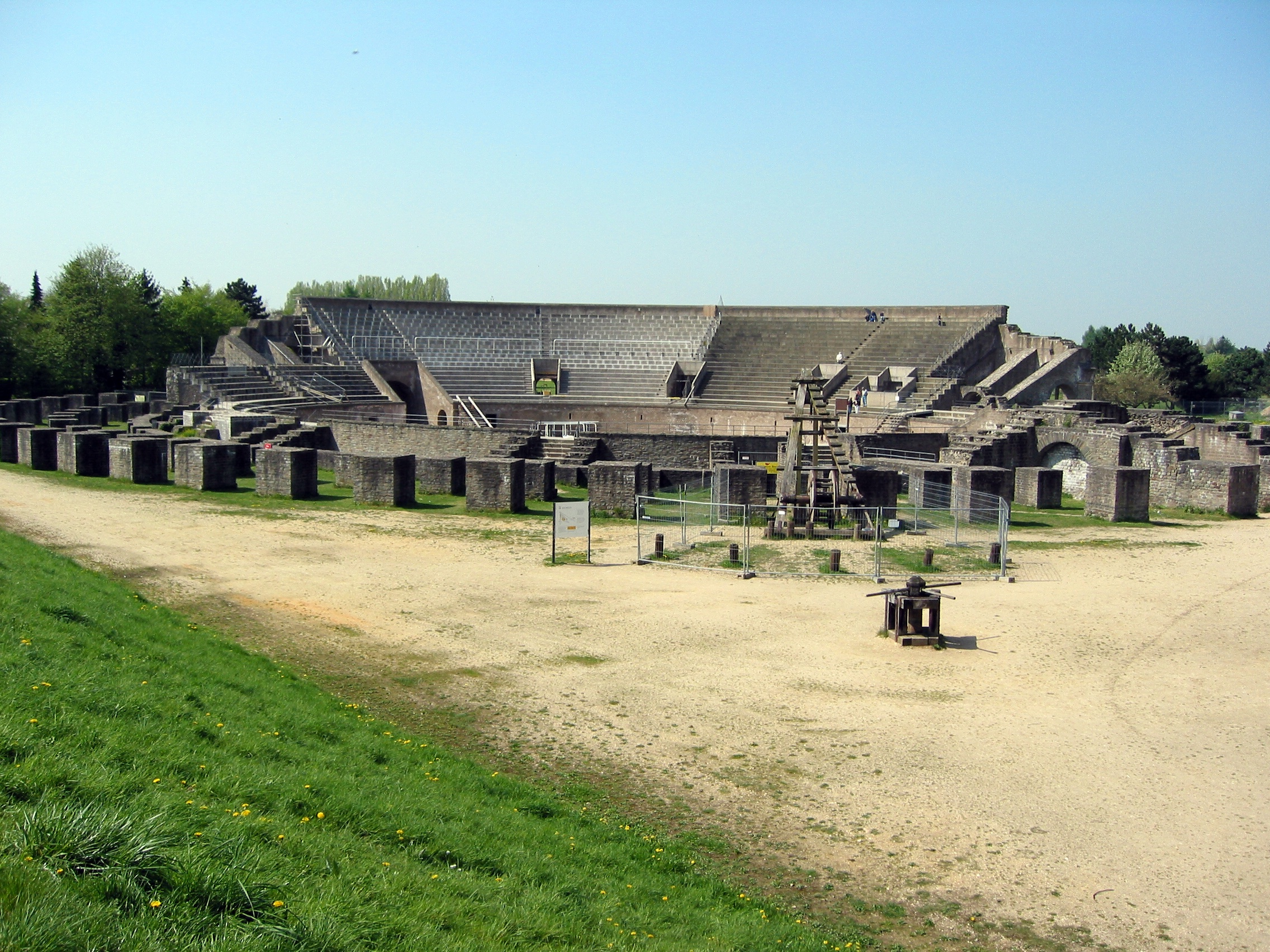
Actual Stadium in rebuilt Amphitheater

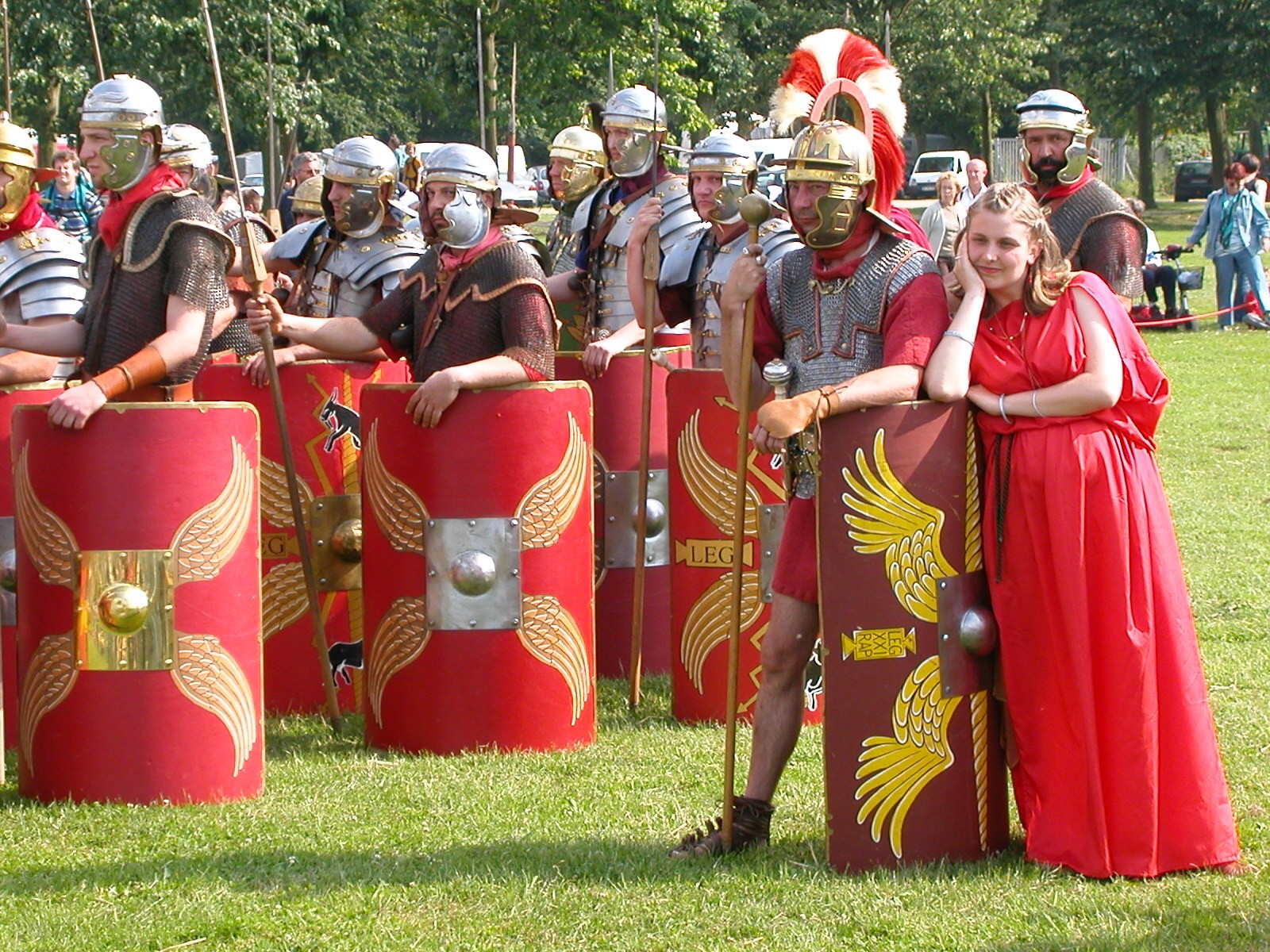
2003 "Romerfest" in "Stadium" of rebuilt Amphitheater

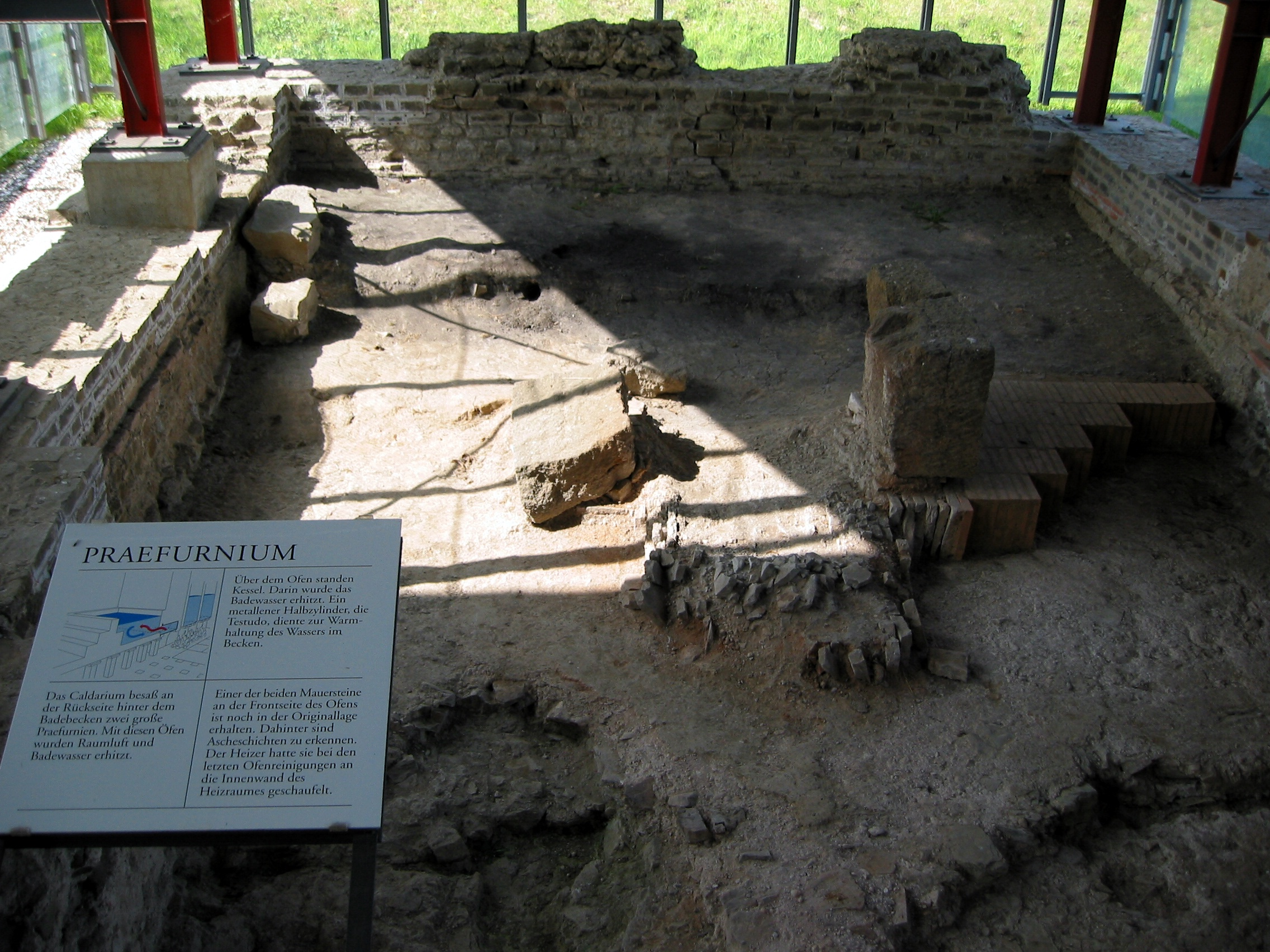
Thermae section

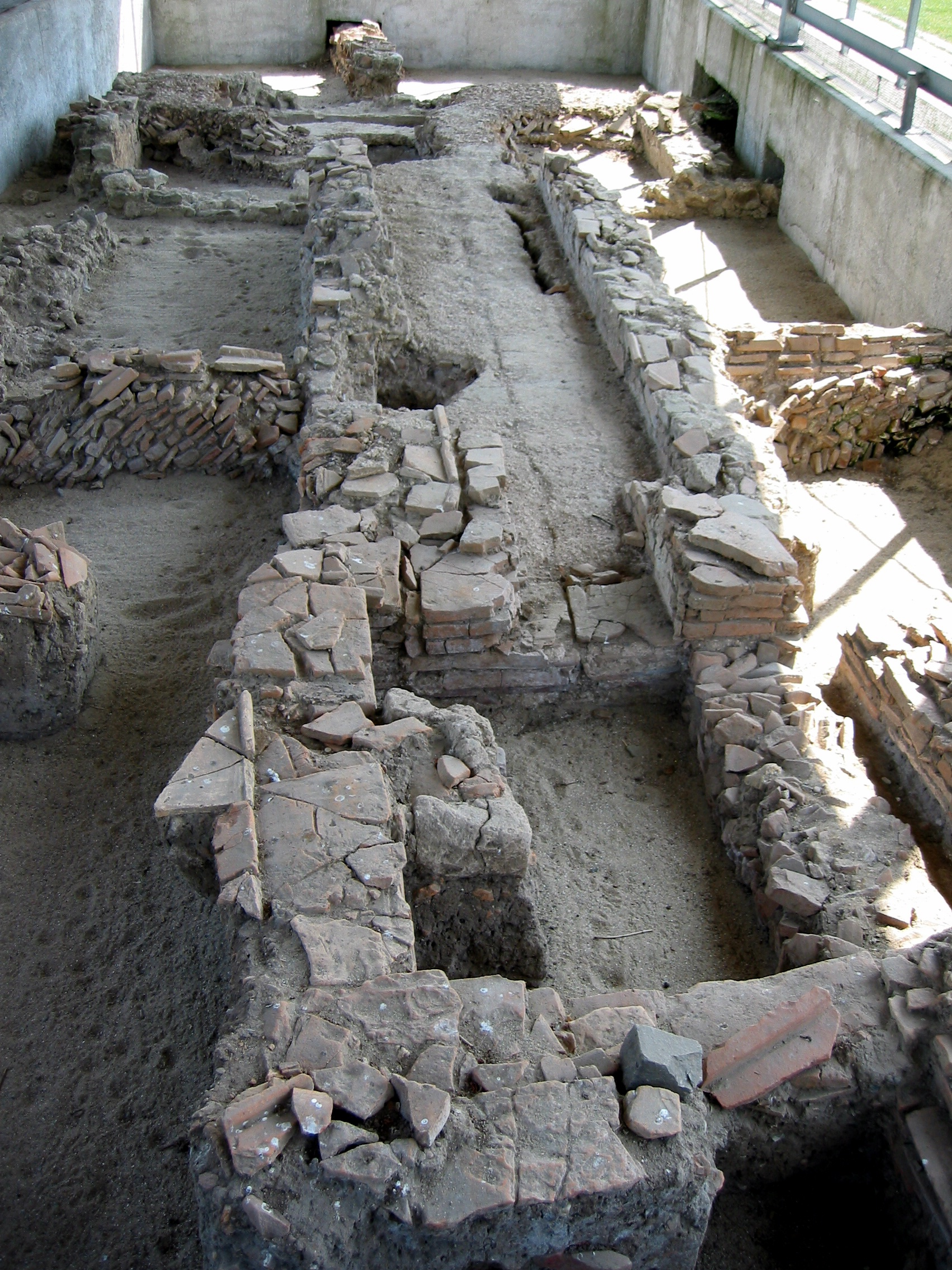
Heating system in Roman buildings

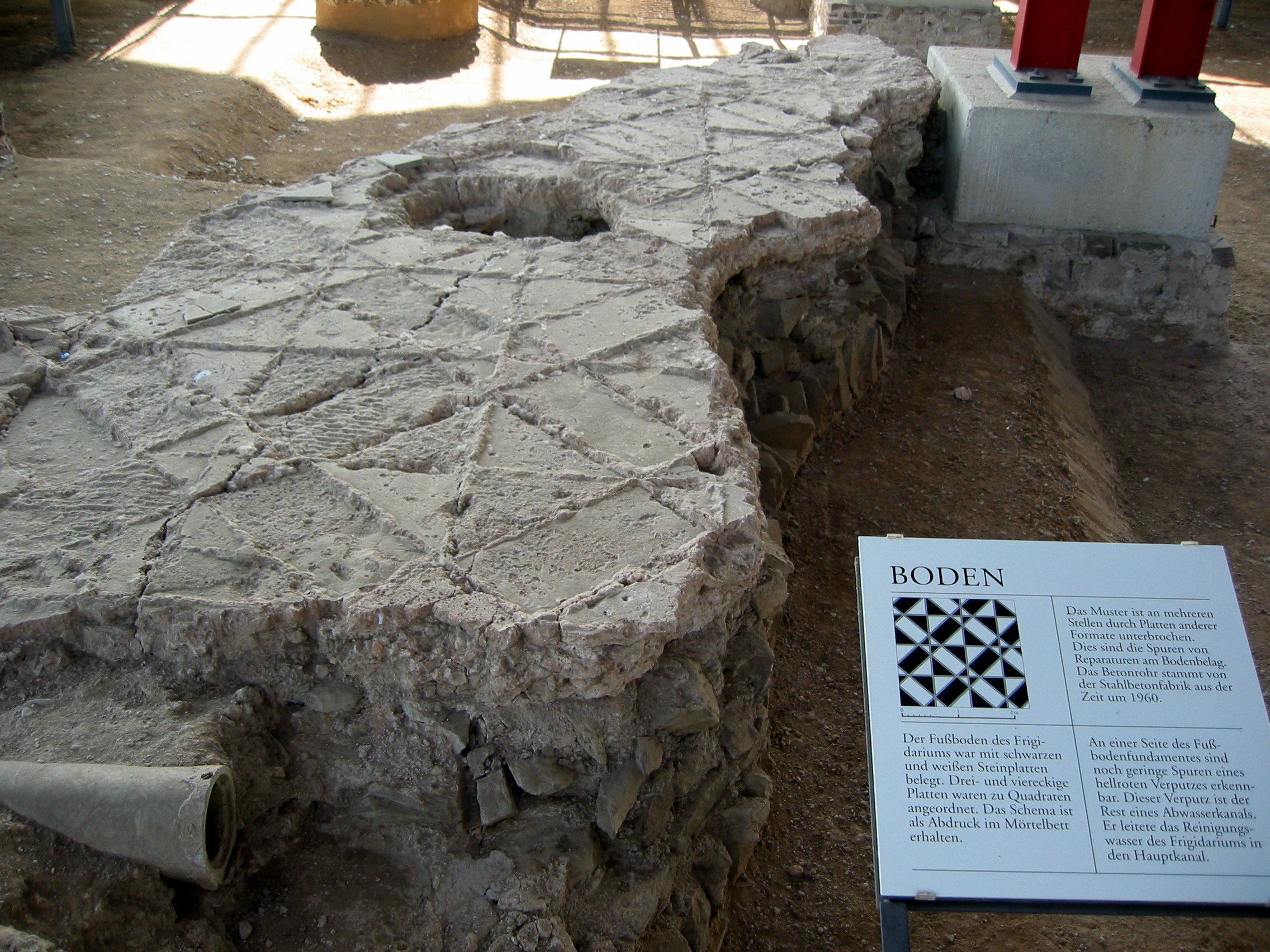
Thermae floor tiles

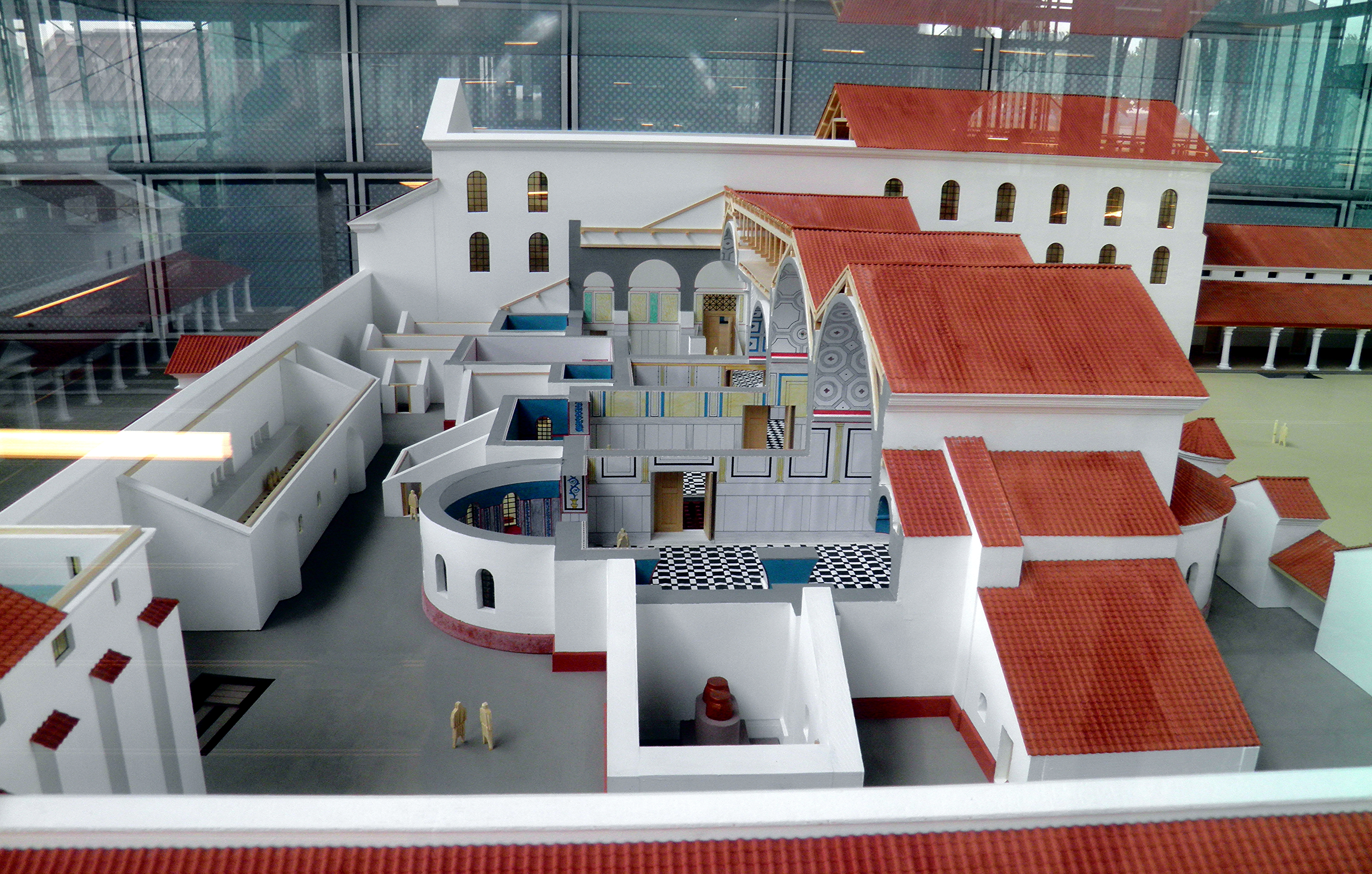
Model of the Roman Baths

Rebuilt "Harbor Temple" in the "Archaeologischer Park"

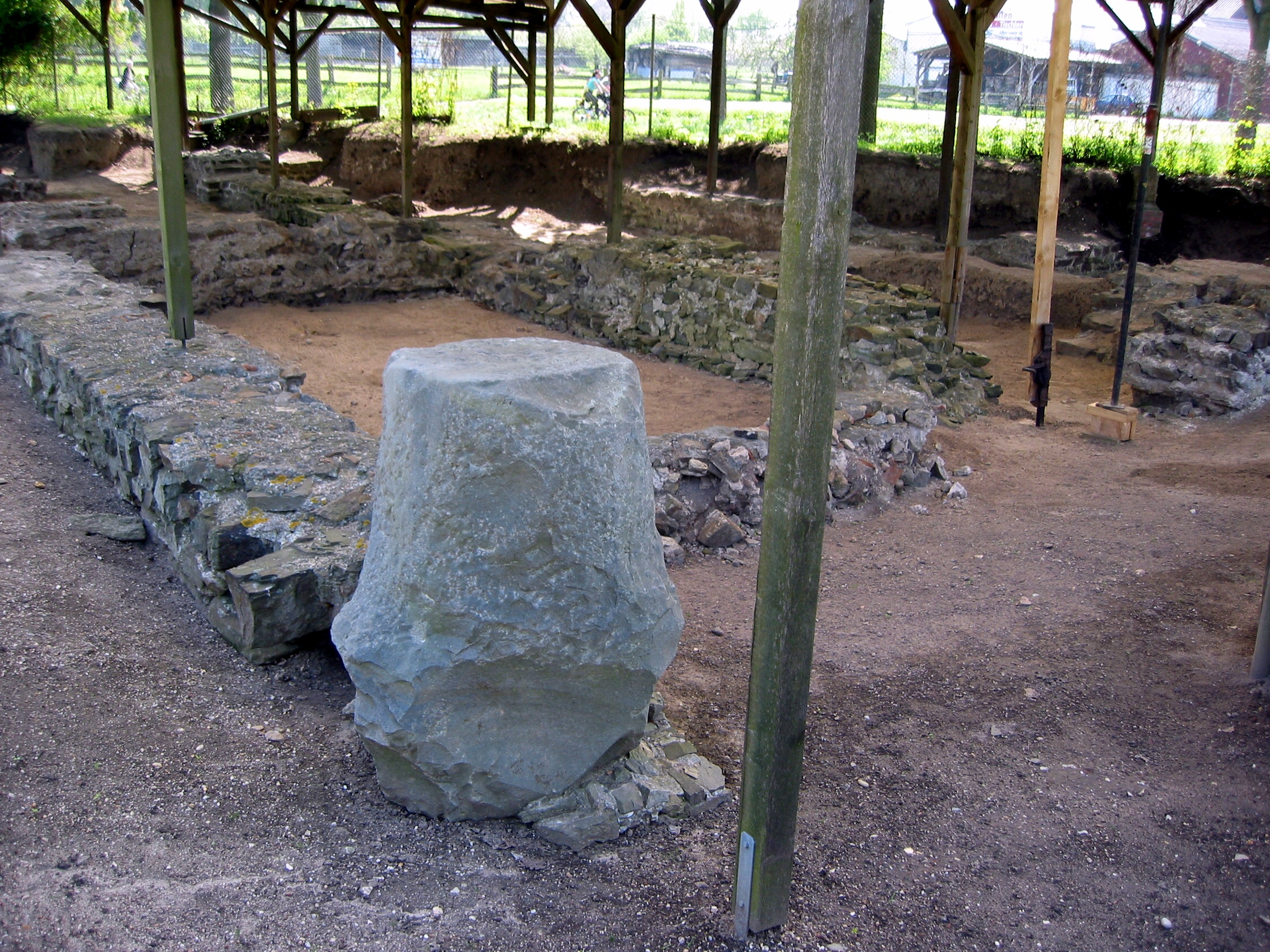
Remains of "Basilica"

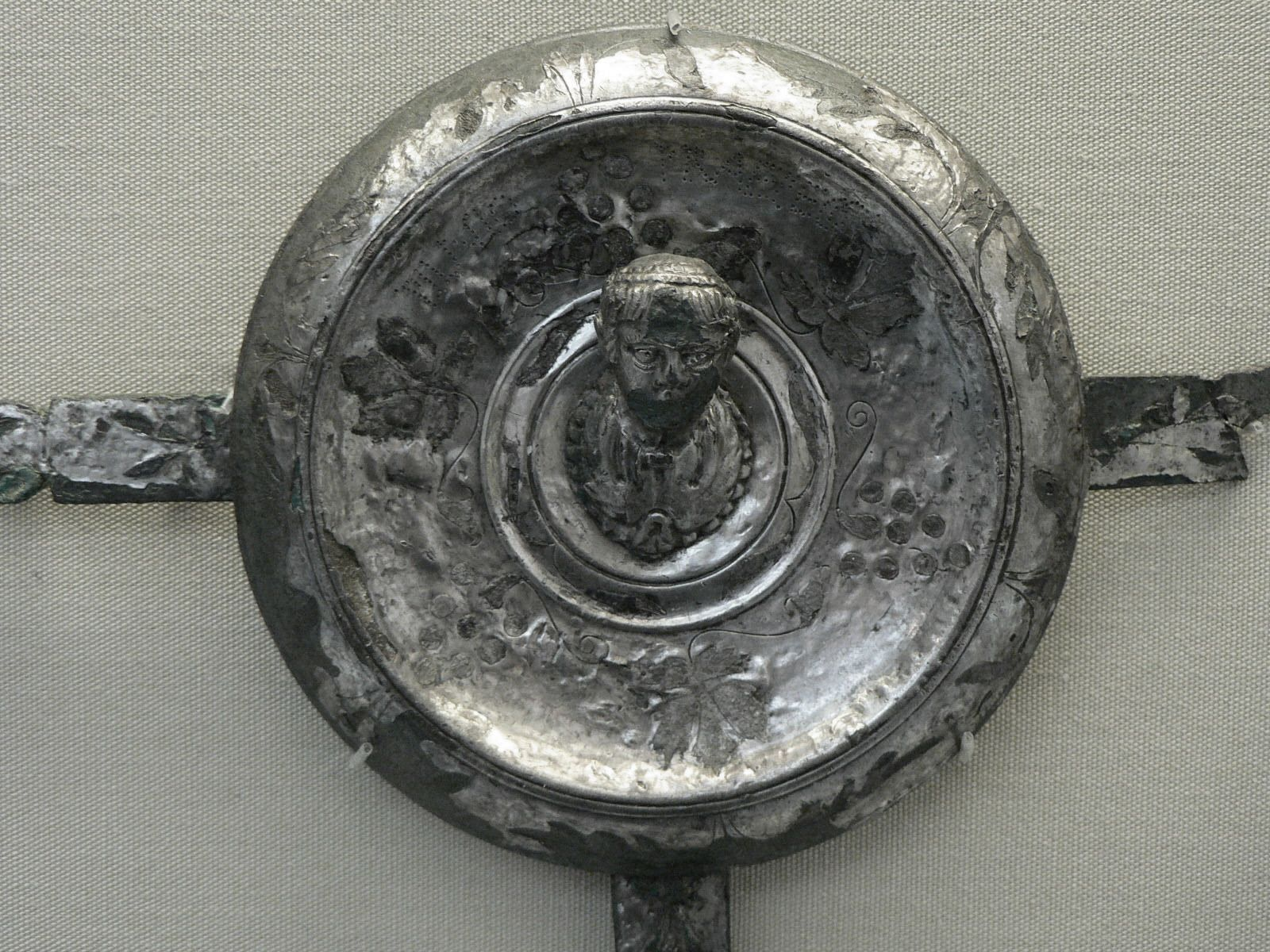
Pliny the Elder's inscribed phalera

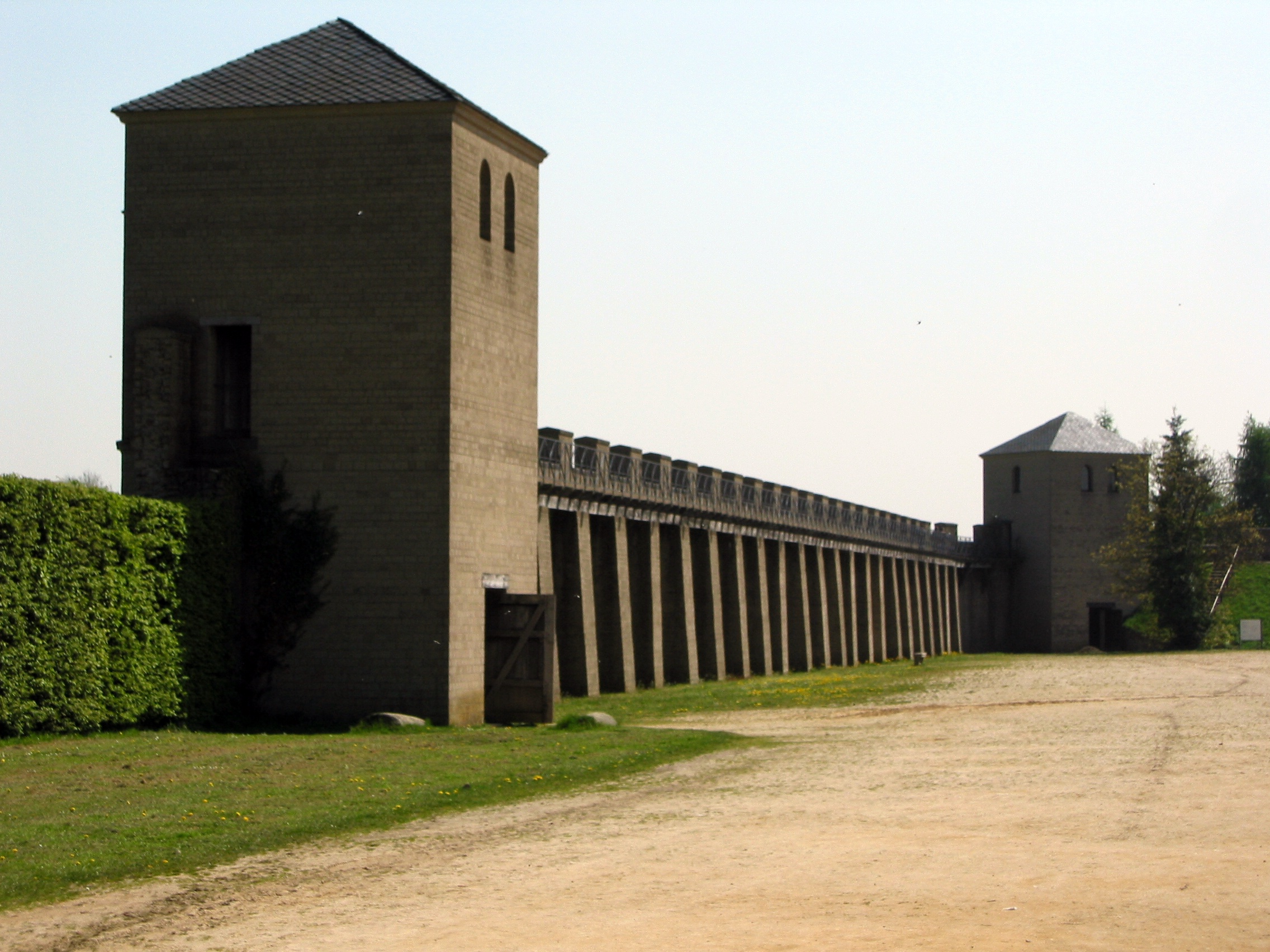
Roman walls in the "Archaeologischer Park"

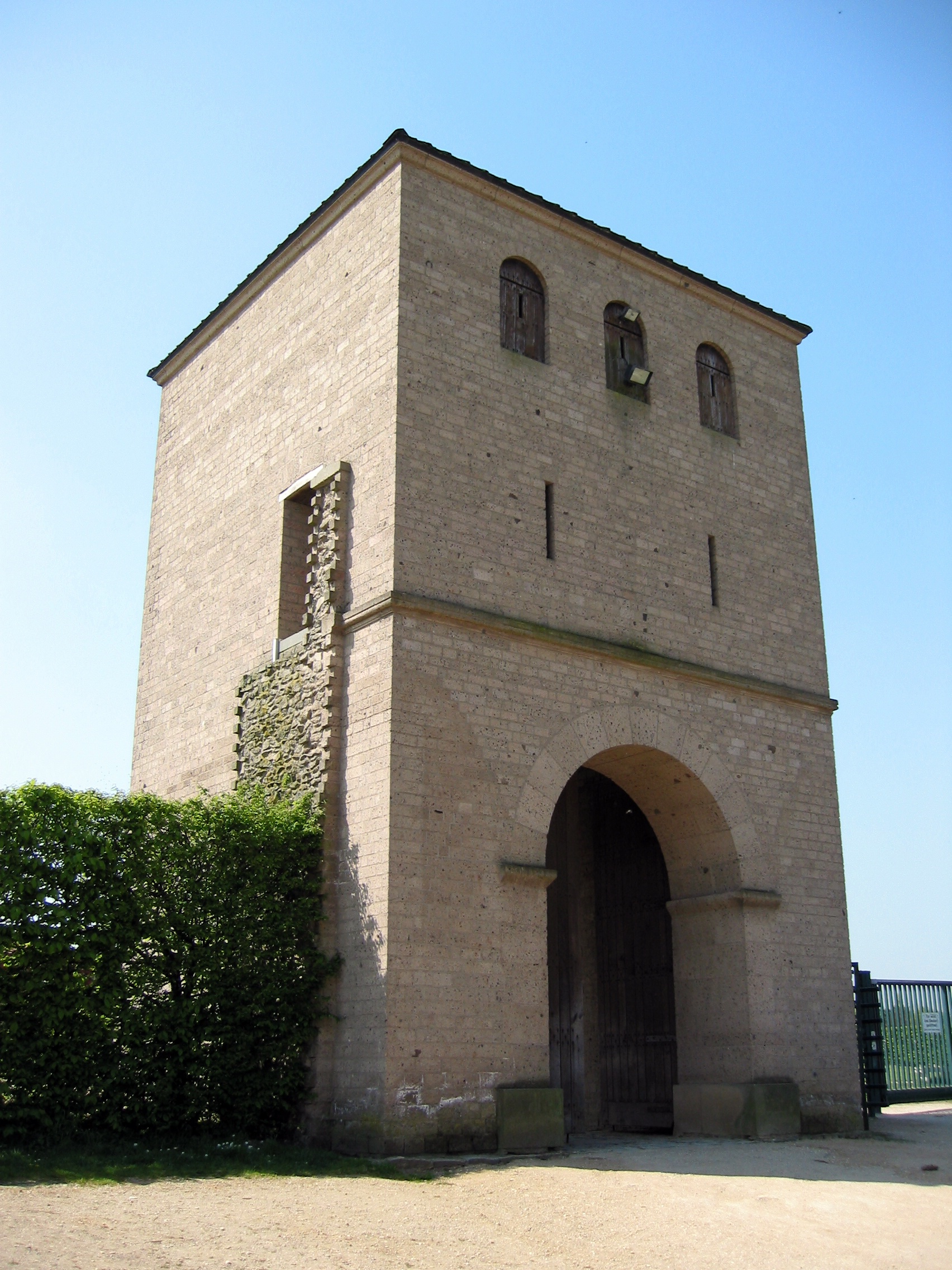
Small Gate in the "Archaeologischer Park"

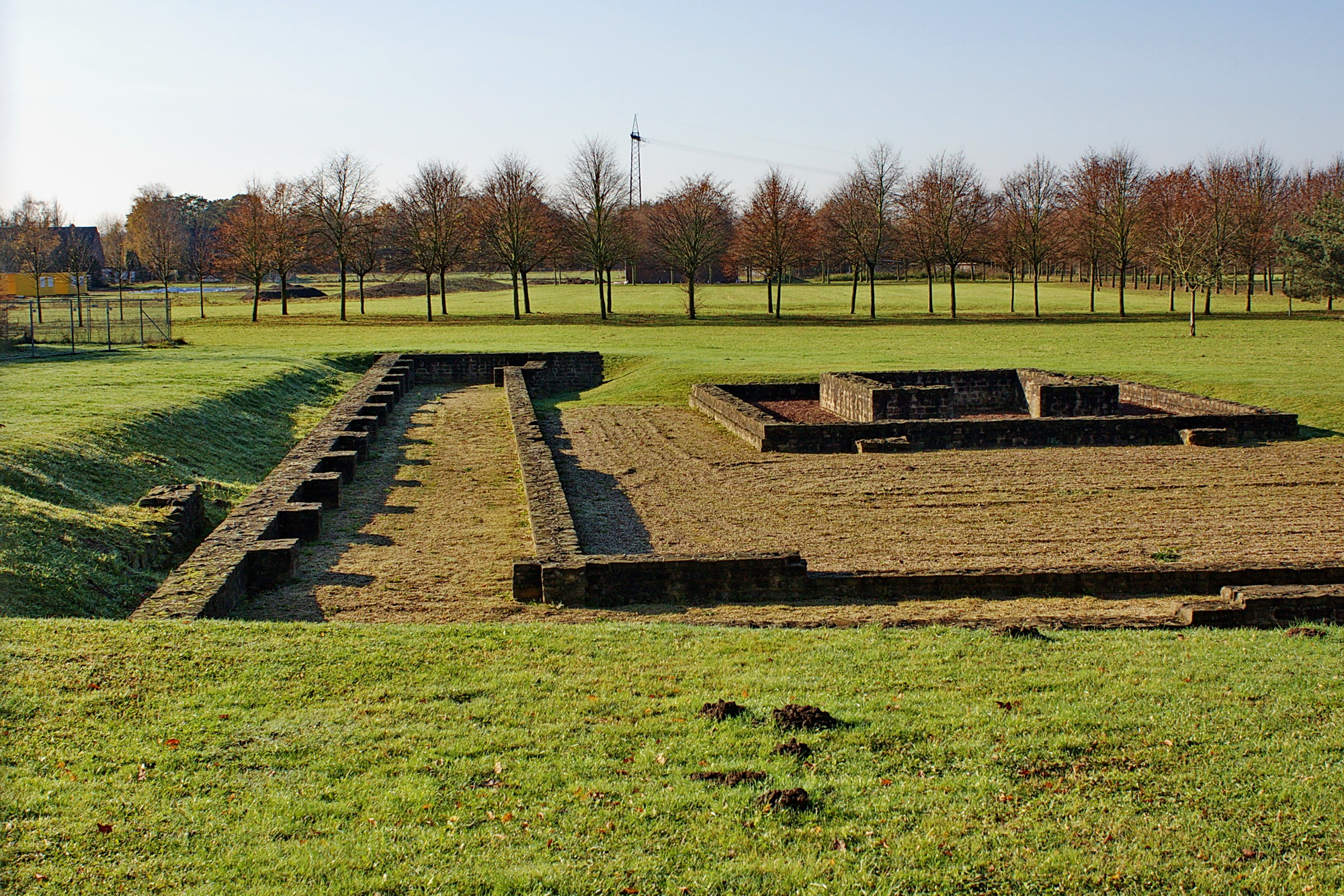
Temple of the Matrons (excavation)

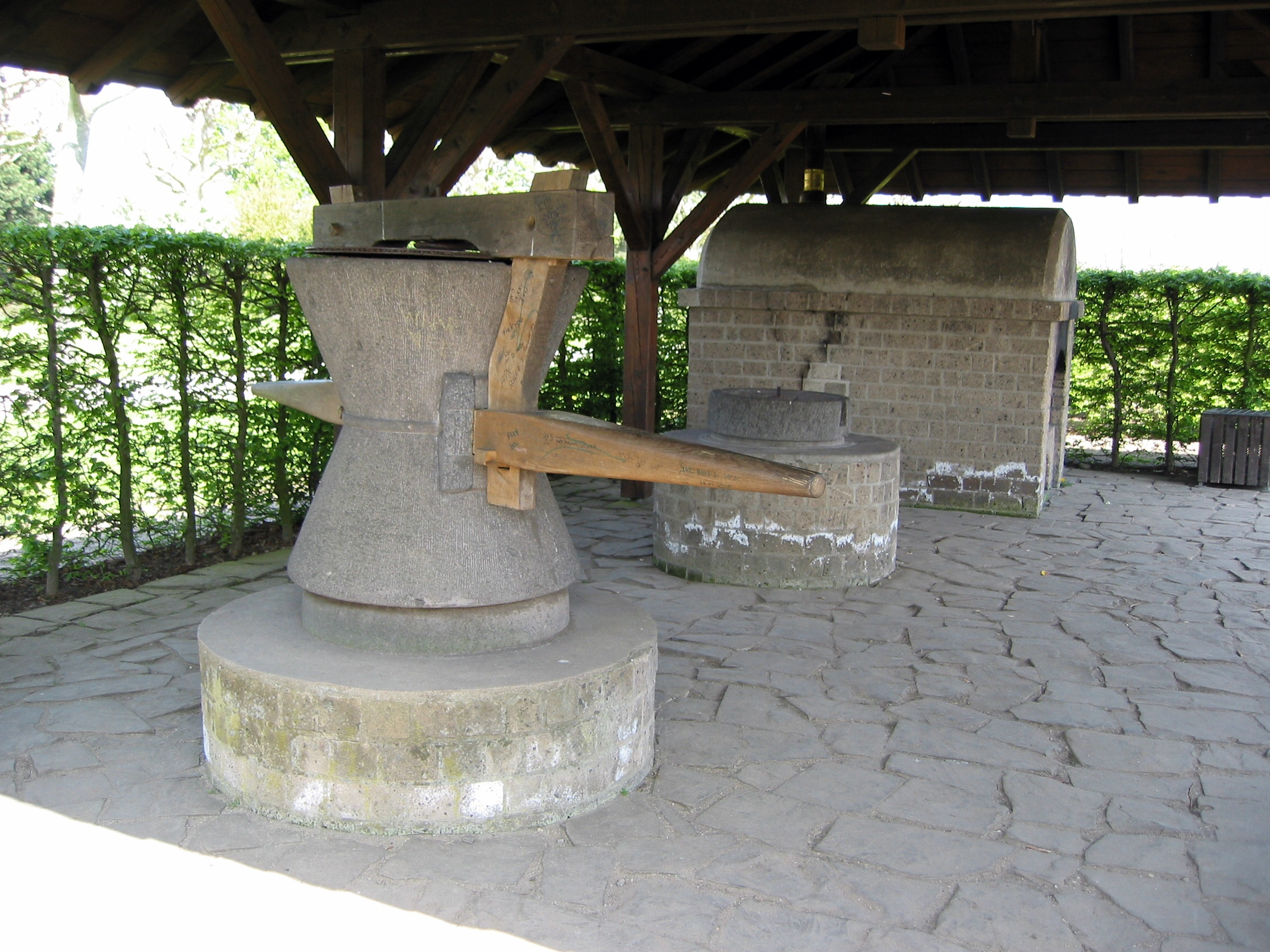
Corn Mill (reconstruction)

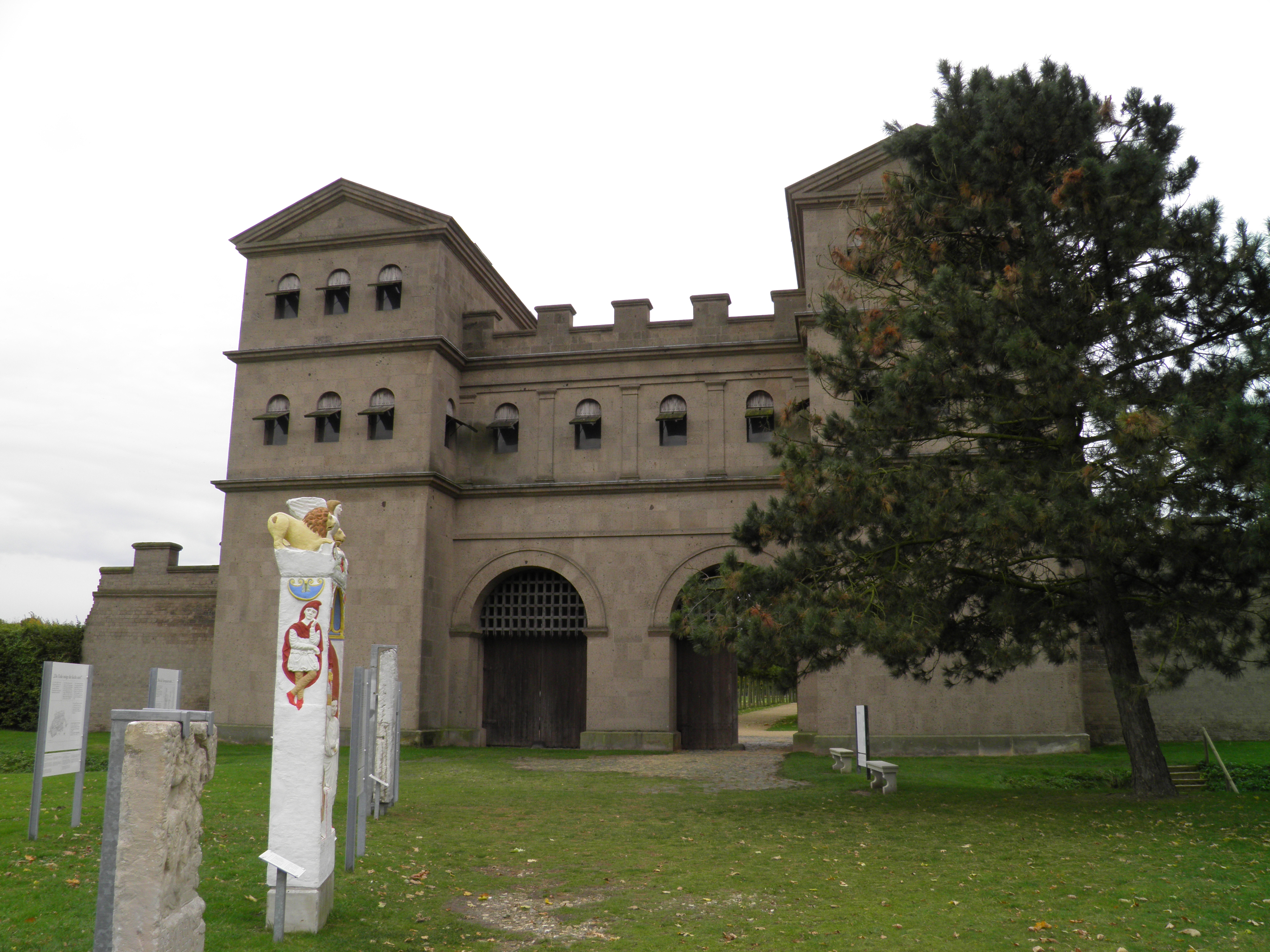
Main Gate in the Archaeologischer Park"

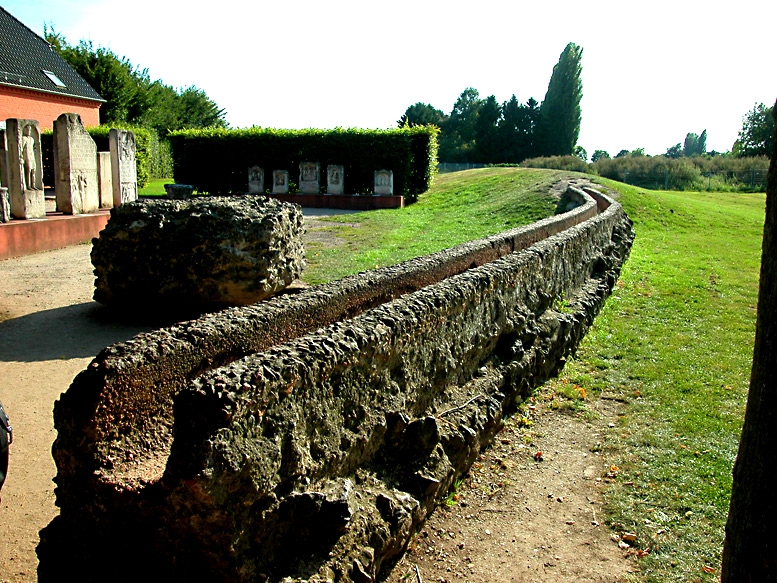
Aqueduct in the "Archaeologischer Park"

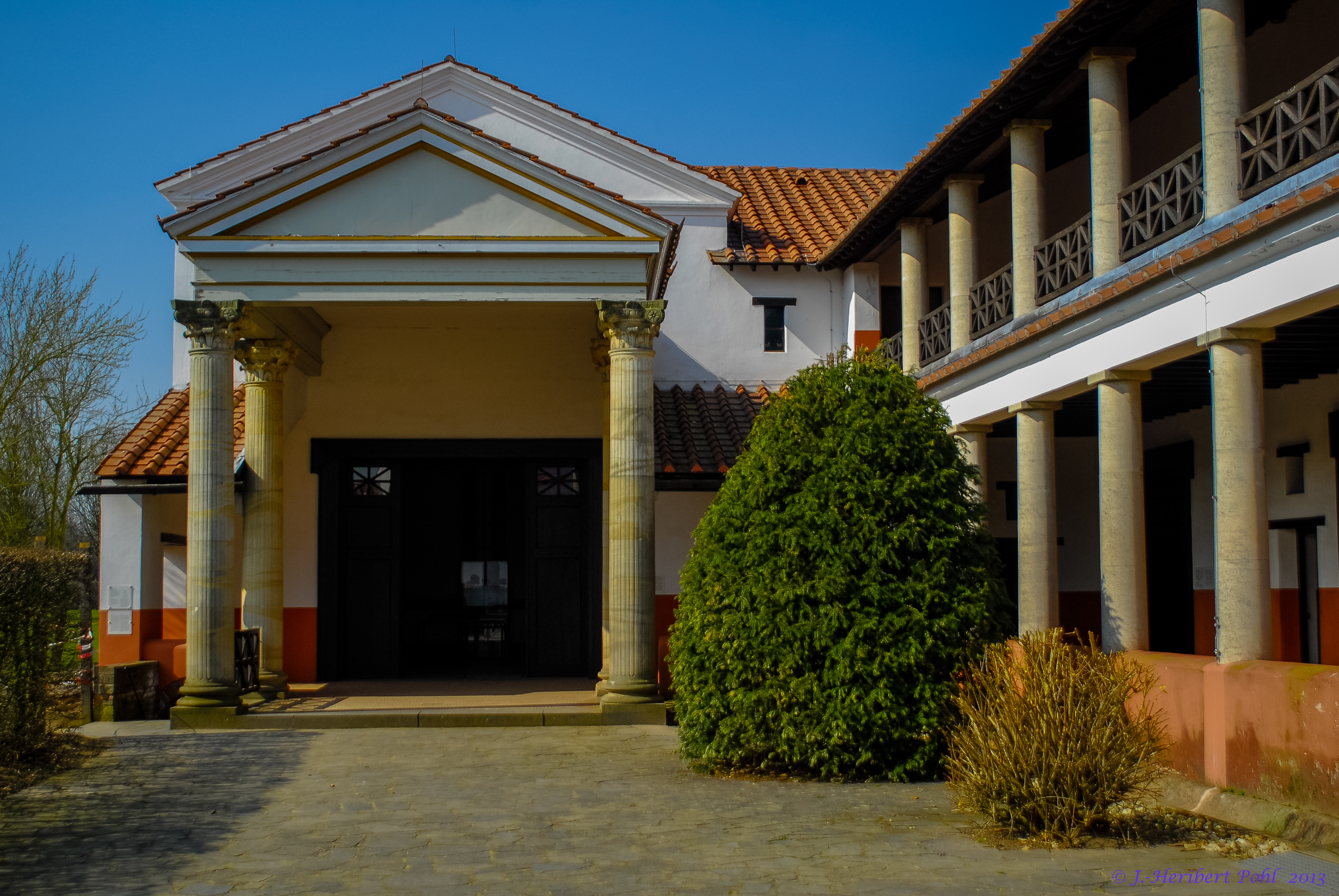
Porticus of reconstructed Roman house

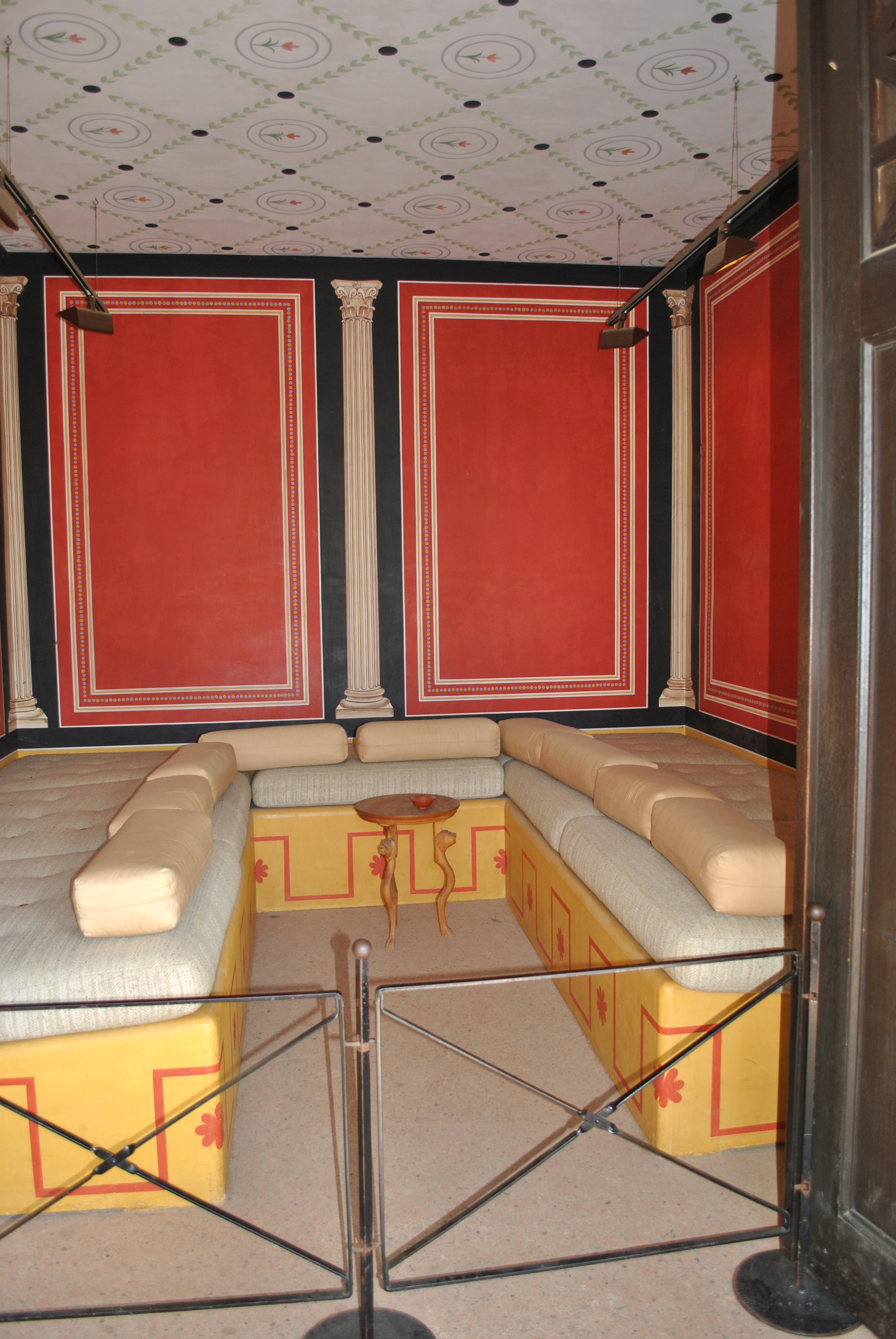
Reconstructed "Triclinum"

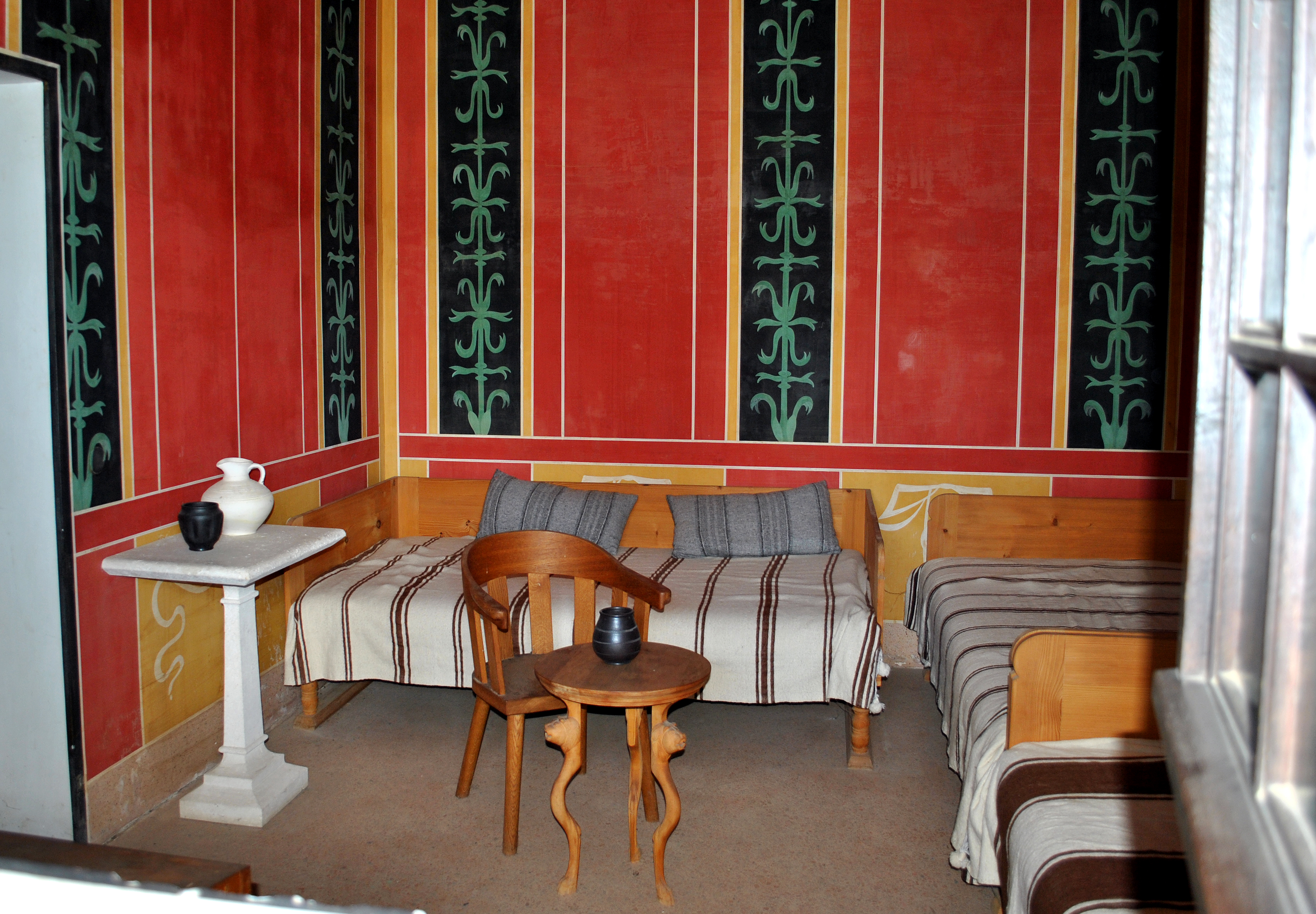
Reconstructed mansion bedroom

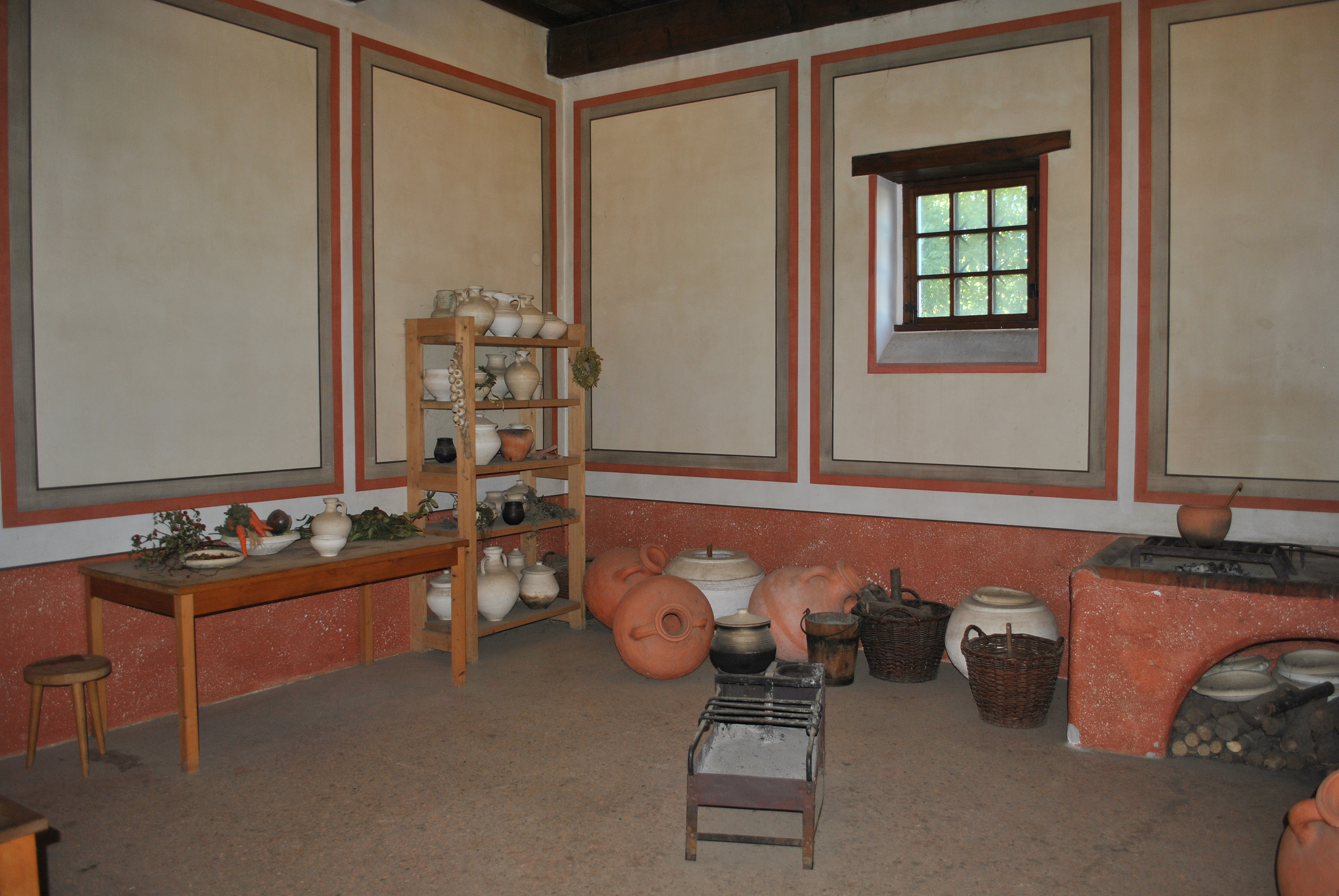
Reconstructed Roman kitchen

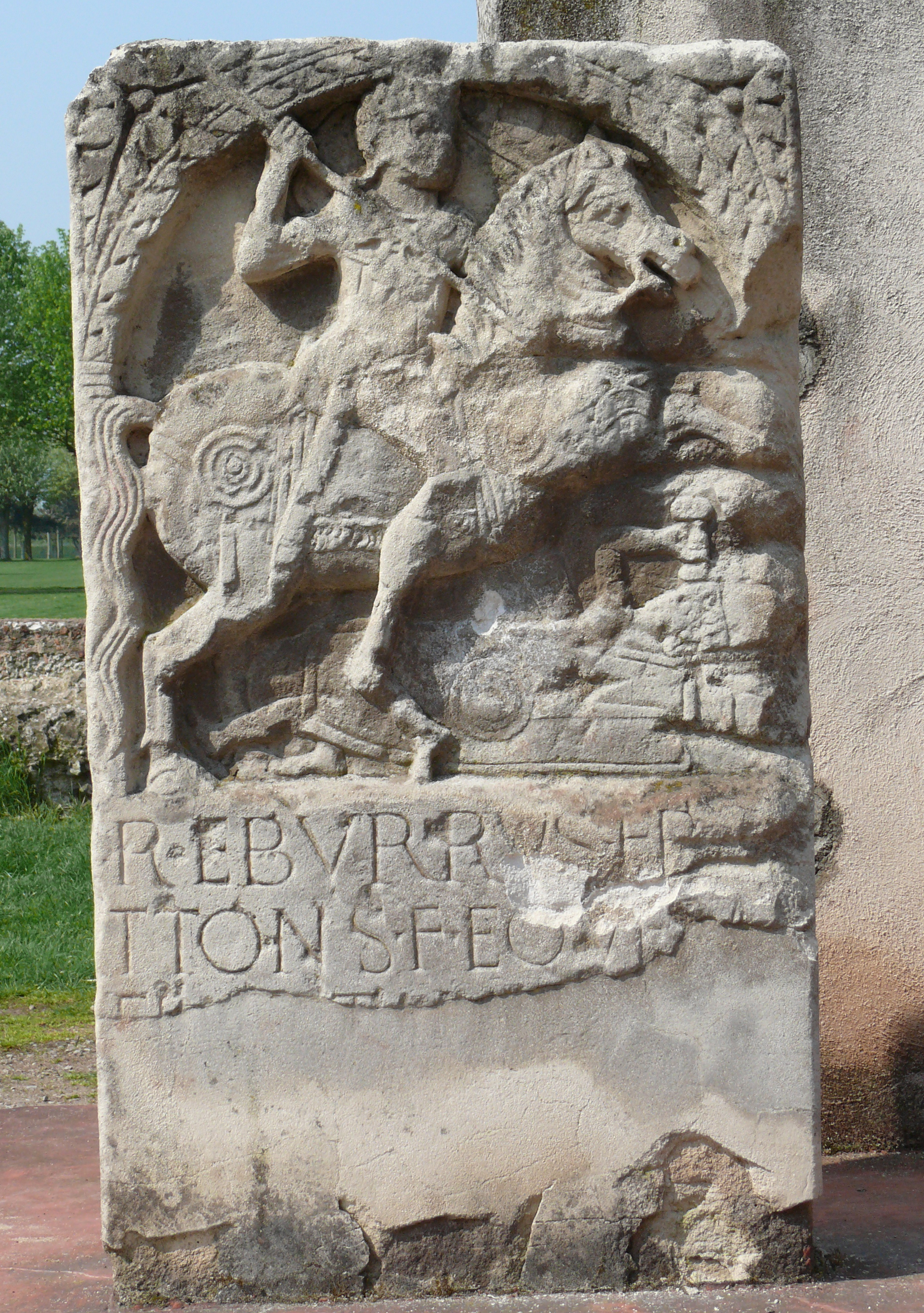
Gravestone of equites "Reburrus"

== See also ==
- Colonia Ulpia Traiana Horse-Phalerae
- Colonia Claudia Ara Agrippinensium
- Germania inferior
- Augusta Treverorum
- List of Roman colonies

== Bibliography ==
The primary publication series for excavation reports, studies of specific find categories, and further research on Colonia Ulpia Traiana is the Xantener Berichte, most of which are freely available on the Archaeological Park Xanten website.

- Helmut, Fuchs; Hilke, Marianne; Pflaum, Martin (2003). Denkmal an Natur. Schutz von Natur und Bodendenkmal im Archäologischen Park Xanten [Monument to nature. Protection of nature and archaeological monuments in the Xanten Archaeological Park] (in German). Landschaftsverband Rheinland.
- Landschaftsverband Rheinland, Rheinisches Landesmuseum Bonn (ed.): Series Colonia Ulpia Traiana. Rheinland-Verlag, Cologne.
  - Arbeitsbericht 4. Zu den Grabungen und Rekonstruktionen. (Work Report 4: On Excavations and Reconstructions.) 1980, ISBN 3-7927-0552-4 (= Guides and Writings of the Archaeological Park Xanten 5)
  - Arbeitsbericht 5. Zu den Grabungen und Rekonstruktionen. (Work Report 5: On Excavations and Reconstructions.) 1981, ISBN 3-7927-0608-3 (= Guides and Writings of the Archaeological Park Xanten 6)
  - Arbeitsbericht 6. Zu den Grabungen und Rekonstruktionen. 1984, ISBN 3-7927-0794-2, trans-title=Work Report 6: On Excavations and Reconstructions.
  - Arbeitsbericht 7. Grabung, Forschung, Präsentation. 1992, ISBN 3-7927-1240-7, trans-title=Work Report 7: Excavation, Research, Presentation.
- Christoph B. Rüger: Colonia Ulpia Traiana. (The Romans in North Rhine-Westphalia.) In: Heinz Günter Horn (ed.): Die Römer in Nordrhein-Westfalen. Licensed edition of the 1987 edition. Nikol, Hamburg 2002, ISBN 3-933203-59-7, pp. 626–638
- Ursula Heimberg, Anita Rieche: Colonia Ulpia Traiana. Die römische Stadt. Planung – Architektur – Ausgrabung. (Colonia Ulpia Traiana: The Roman City. Planning – Architecture – Excavation.) Rheinland-Verlag, Cologne 1998, ISBN 3-7927-1725-5; Habelt, Bonn 1998 (= Guides and Writings of the Archaeological Park Xanten 18)
- Jansen, Brita; Schreiter, Charlotte; Zelle, Michael (2001). Die römischen Wandmalereien aus dem Stadtgebiet der Colonia Ulpia Traiana. Band I: Die Funde aus den Privatbauten [Roman murals from the urban area of Colonia Ulpia Traiana. Volume I: Finds from private buildings] (in German). Philipp von Zabern. pp. 124–137. ISBN 3-8053-2873-7.
- Müller, Martin; Schalles, Hans-Joachim; Norbert, Michael (2008). Colonia Ulpia Traiana. Xanten und sein Umland in römischer Zeit [Colonia Ulpia Traiana: Xanten and Its Surroundings in Roman Times] (in German). Philipp von Zabern. pp. 124–137. ISBN 978-3-8053-3953-7.
- Martin Müller, Bernhard Rudnick, Norbert Zieling: Colonia Ulpia Traiana, Xanten. Die geophysikalischen Untersuchungen mit GPR der Jahre 2006 bis 2023 (Colonia Ulpia Traiana, Xanten: Geophysical Investigations with GPR from 2006 to 2023.) (= Xantener Berichte. Volume 47). Nünnerich-Asmus, Oppenheim 2024, ISBN 978-3-96176-305-4
- José Remesal Rodríguez (ed.): Colonia Ulpia Traiana (Xanten) y el Mediterráneo. El comercio de alimentos. (Colonia Ulpia Traiana (Xanten) and the Mediterranean: The Trade in Foodstuffs.) Publicacions. Universitat de Barcelona, Barcelona 2019, ISBN 978-84-9168-197-7
