= Capitoline of Colonia Ulpia Traiana =

The Capitoline of Colonia Ulpia Traiana was a sanctuary in Colonia Ulpia Traiana, capitol of the Roman province Germania inferior, and likely dedicated to the Capitoline Triad of Jupiter, Juno and Minerva. The temple was founded during the 2nd century and active until at least the 3rd century.
