= Hermann Hinz =

German archaeologist (1916–2000)

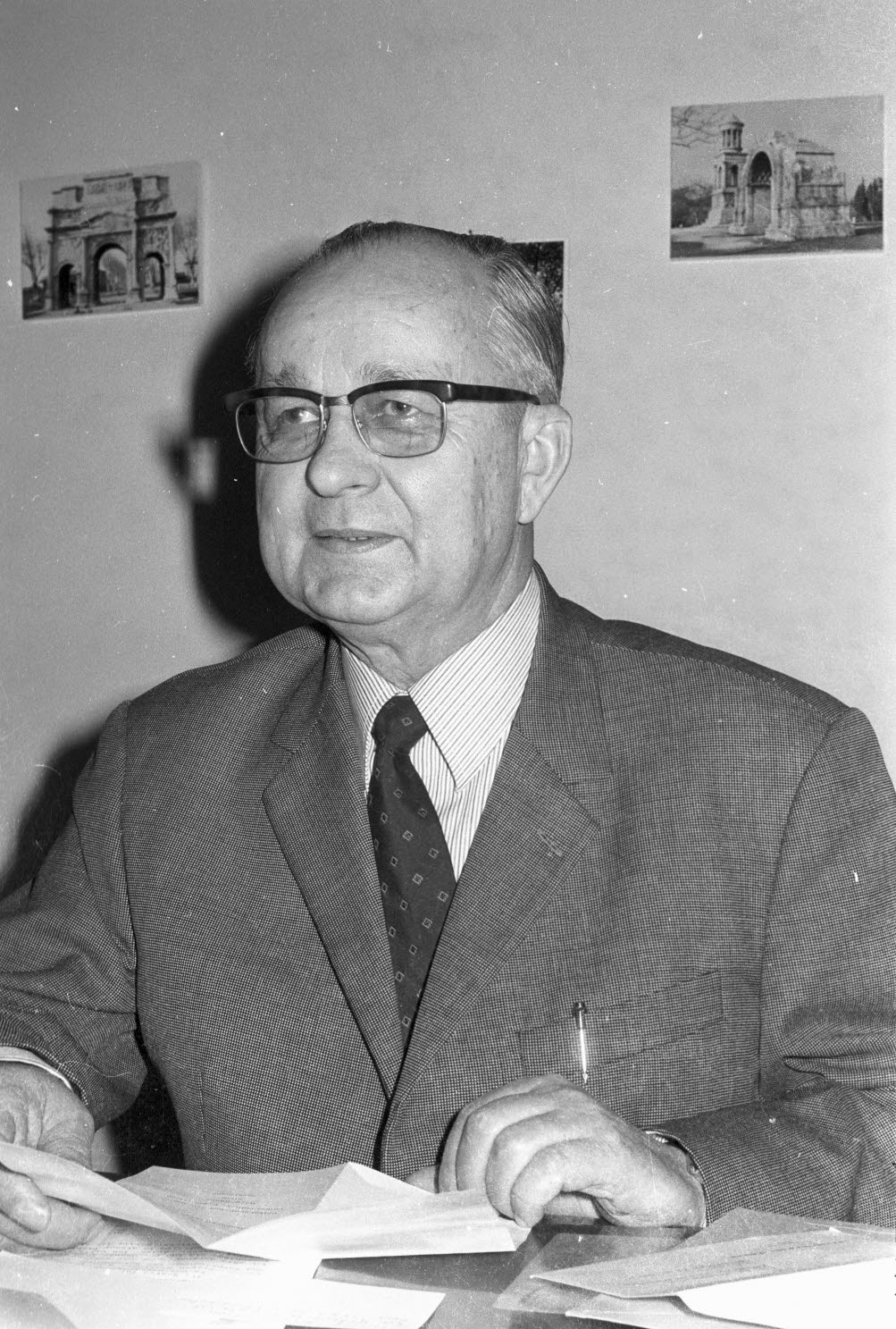
- Born: 13 February 1916; Wangerin, German Empire
- Died: 21 December 2000 (aged 84); Bad Krozingen, Germany

Academic background
- Education: University of Kiel

Academic work
- Discipline: Archaeology
- Institutions: Rheinisches Landesmuseum Bonn; University of Kiel
- Main interests: Archaeology of Germanic peoples

Hermann Hinz (13 February 1916 – 21 December 2000) was a German archaeologist who was Professor and Head of the Institute for Prehistory and Protohistory at the University of Kiel.

== Biography ==
Hermann Hinz was born in Wangerin, German Empire on 13 February 1916, the son of Wilhelm and Ida Hinz. After graduating from the gymnasium in Köslin in 1935, Hinz served in the Freiwillige Arbeitsdienst and the Wehrmacht. Since 1937, Hinz studied at Lauenburg. Hinz transferred to the University of Freiburg in 1938, where he studied prehistory, anthropology, art history, history, geology, folklore and classical archaeology. From 1939 to 1941 he worked at Greifswald for his doctorate. He gained his Ph.D. in archaeology at the University of Kiel in 1941.

Hinz served in the Wehrmacht during World War II, and became a prisoner of war. He was released from captivity in 1945, and worked until 1948 as an elementary school teacher in Langenhorn. From 1949 to 1952 he worked conducted archaeological research in Schleswig-Holstein with a grant from the German Research Foundation. From 1954 to 1965 Hinz held a variety of senior positions at the Rheinisches Landesmuseum Bonn.

Since 1965 Hinz was associate professor, and since 1969 Professor, at the University of Kiel. He was also the Director of the Institute for Prehistory and Protohistory at the university.

Hinz retired from Kiel in 1981, and died in Bad Krozingen on 21 December 2000.

== Selected works ==
- Die Ausgrabungen in der Alten reformierten Kirche Wuppertal-Elberfeld, Wuppertal 1954
- Vorgeschichte des nordfriesischen Festlandes, Neumünster, 1954
- Die Vorgeschichte der Kreise Dramburg und Neustettin, Greifswald, 1957
- Xanten zur Römerzeit, Th. Gesthuysen, Xanten 1960
- Kaster, Bedburg/Erft, 1964
- Archäologische Funde und Denkmäler des Rheinlandes / Bd. 2. Kreis Bergheim, 1969
- Das fränkische Gräberfeld von Eick, Berlin, 1969
- Die Ausgrabungen auf dem Kirchberg in Morken, Kreis Bergheim (Erft), Düsseldorf : Rheinland-Verl., 1969
- Germania Romana / 3. Römisches Leben auf germanischen Boden, 1970
- Ein frührömisches Gräberfeld auf dem Kirchhügel in Birten, Kreis Moers. In: Rheinische Ausgrabungen. 12. Rheinland-Verlag, Bonn 1973, S. 24–83.
- Frühe Städte im westlichen Ostseeraum, Kiel, 1973
- Siedlungsforschungen auf den dänischen Inseln und im westlichen Ostseeraum, Kiel, 1980
- Motte und Donjon, Rheinland-Verlag, Köln, 1981, ISBN 3-7927-0433-1
- mit Helmut Jäger: Einzelhof. In the Lexicon of Germanic Antiquity Studies (Reallexikon der Germanischen Altertumskunde) (RGA). 2nd edition, Vol. 7, Walter de Gruyter, Berlin/New York 1989, p(p). 47–51.
- Ländlicher Hausbau in Skandinavien vom 6. bis 14. Jahrhundert, Rheinland-Verlag, Köln, 1989, ISBN 3-7927-0989-9

== See also ==
- Herbert Jankuhn

== Selected works ==
- "Hermann Hinz".
- Bernhard Hänsel und Karl W. Struve (Hrsg.): Festschrift Hermann Hinz zum 65. Geburtstag. (= Offa. Berichte und Mitteilungen zur Urgeschichte, Frühgeschichte und Mittelalterarchäologie, 37/1980), Wachholtz, Neumünster 1981, ISBN 3-529-01237-8.
