= Xanten Horse-Phalerae =

Ancient Roman Horse-Trappings

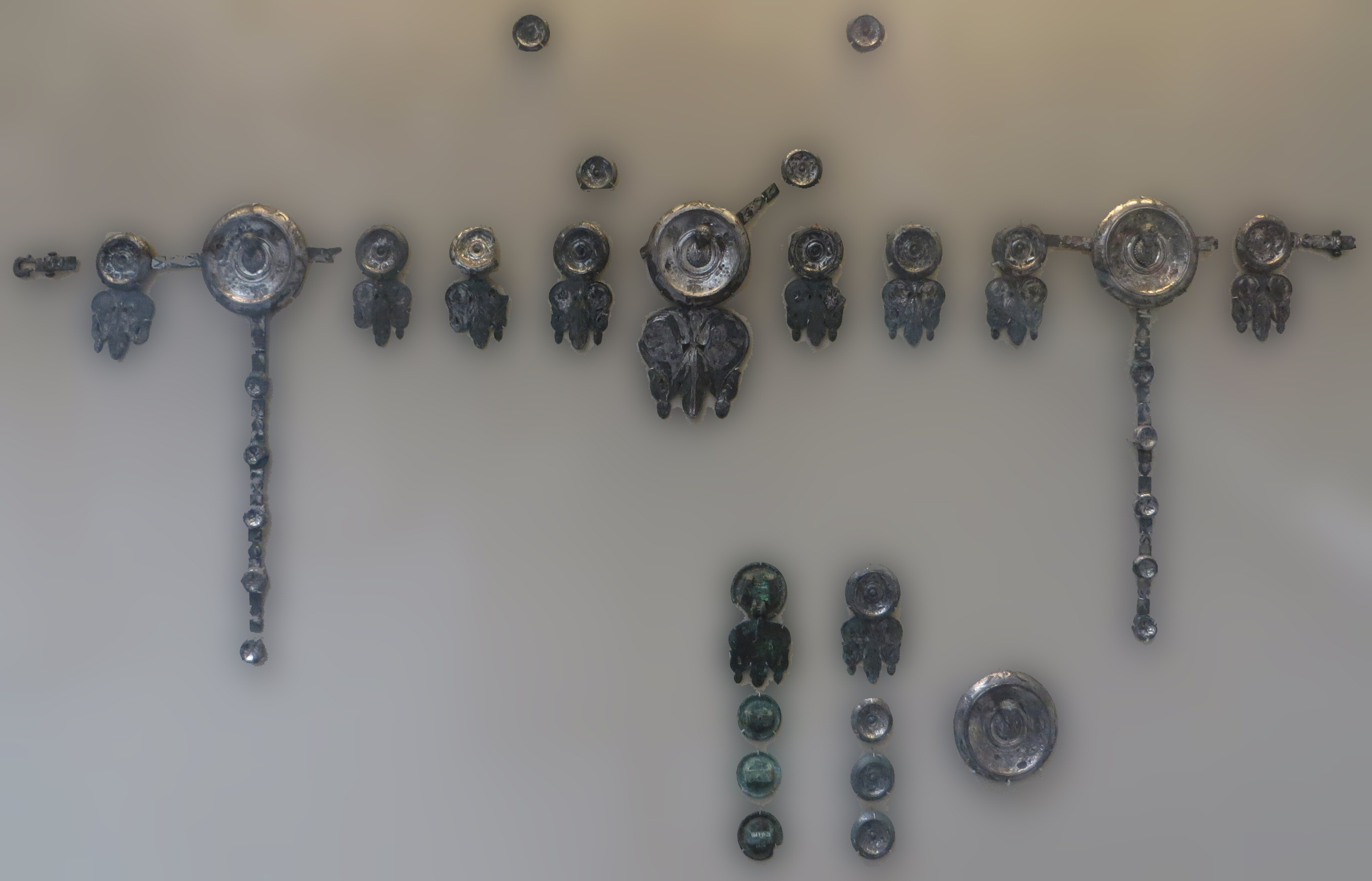
- Horse-Trappings from Xanten as displayed in the British Museum
- Material: Silvered bronze
- Size: Diameter of largest phalera - 10.5 cm
- Created: 1st Century AD
- Present location: British Museum, London
- Registration: GR 1854.7-17.53 (Bronzes 2871)

The Xanten Horse-Phalerae is the name of a set of Roman silvered bronze horse-trappings found in Xanten, Germany. The set is now in the British Museum's Greek and Roman antiquities collection.

One of the decorations bears an inscription meaning "while Pliny was prefect of cavalry". This provides an important link to the famous Roman historian Pliny the Elder, who later witnessed the destruction of Pompeii.

== History ==
The horse trappings were found in the early nineteenth century at the Roman city of Castra Vetera near modern-day Xanten in the state of North Rhine-Westphalia. Castra Vera was an important Roman army camp for the Classis Germanica regiment that provided protection and security along the frontier of the Roman Empire. The heightened military presence encouraged the development of a large city nearby that became the second largest settlement in the province of Germania Inferior.

== Inscription to Pliny the Elder ==
Gaius Plinius Secundus, better known as Pliny the Elder, was a Roman historian, author and army commander in the reign of the Emperors Claudius and Nero. Famous for writing Naturalis Historia, he also witnessed the eruption of Mount Vesuvius and the destruction of Pompeii and Herculaneum. One of the horse-trappings bears his name and reads: PLINIO PRAEF(ECTO) EQ(UITUM) ('while Pliny was Prefect of the cavalry'). This suggests that these horse-phalerae belonged to a cavalryman under his command when Pliny was stationed in Germania Inferior in approximately 50 AD.

== Description ==
The set of horse-trappings is made of about 60 silvered-bronze phalerae and forms part of a decorative equestrian harness that is only partly preserved. Organic material such as leather has not survived but enough roundels have to enable a partial reconstruction of the set in the museum. One of the phalerae has the bust of a Roman Emperor, but it is difficult to determine which emperor is represented from the appearance.

== See also ==
- Ribchester Helmet
- Mainz Gladius

== Gallery ==
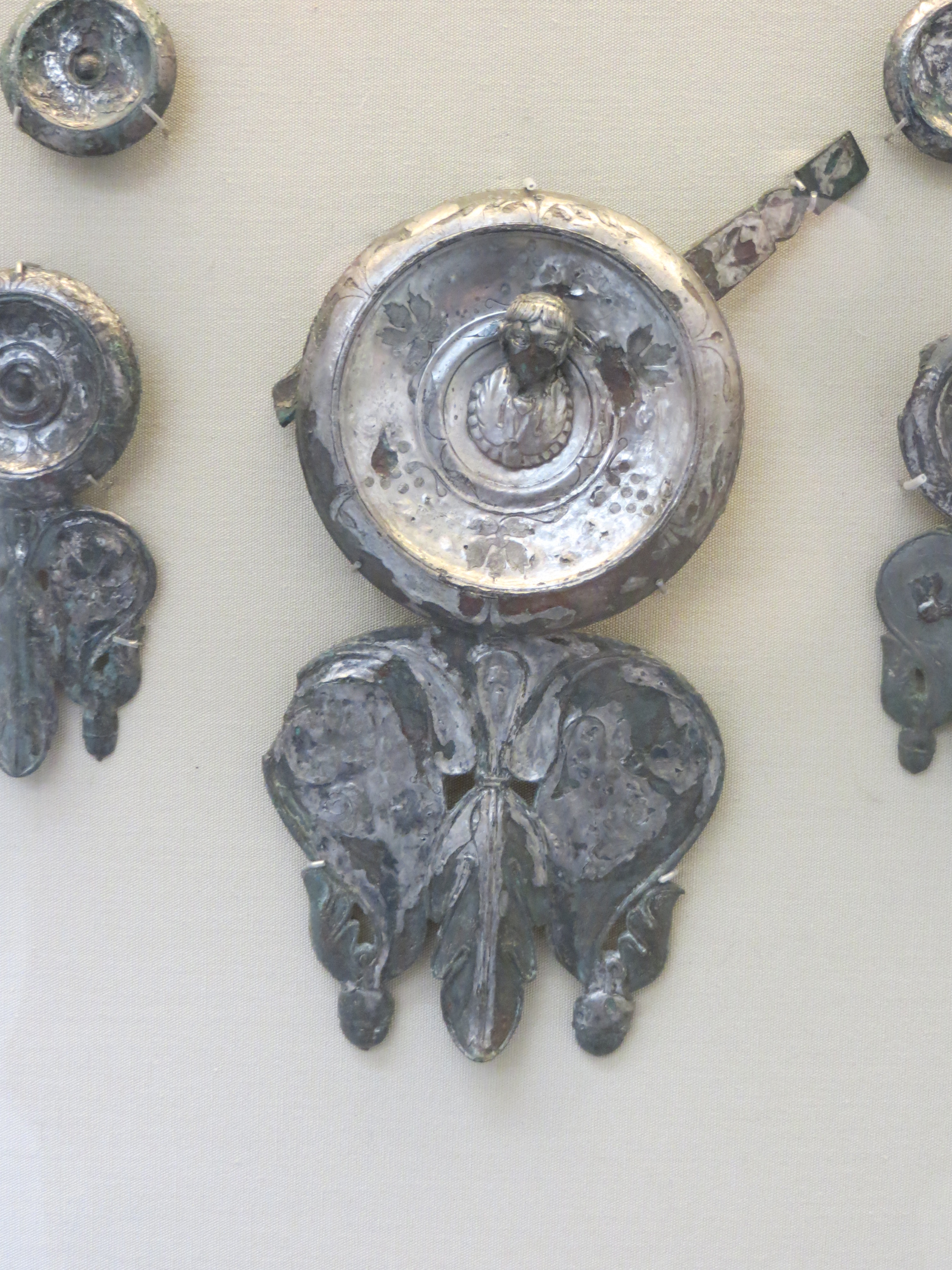
Image of a roundel with the bust of an emperor

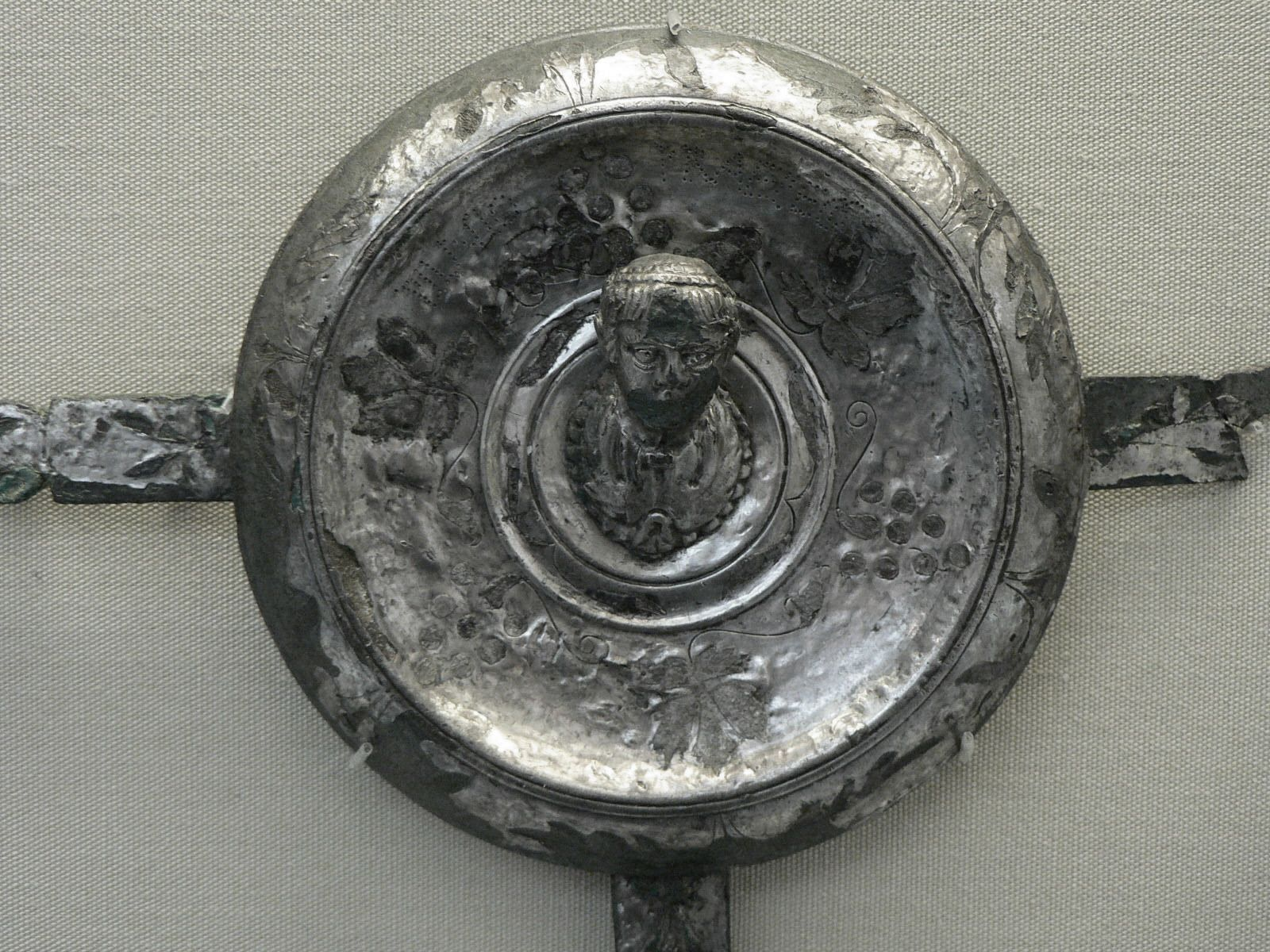
Detail of the phalera with Latin inscription

== Bibliography ==
- L. Burn, The British Museum Book of Greek and Roman Art (British Museum Press, 1991)
- S. Walker, Roman Art (British Museum Press, 1991)
- I.D. Jenkins, 'A group of silvered-bronze horse-trappings from Xanten (Castra Vetera)', Britannia-2, 16 (1985), pp. 141–64
