= Lower Germanic Limes =

Frontiers of the Roman Empire – The Lower German Limes
UNESCO World Heritage Site
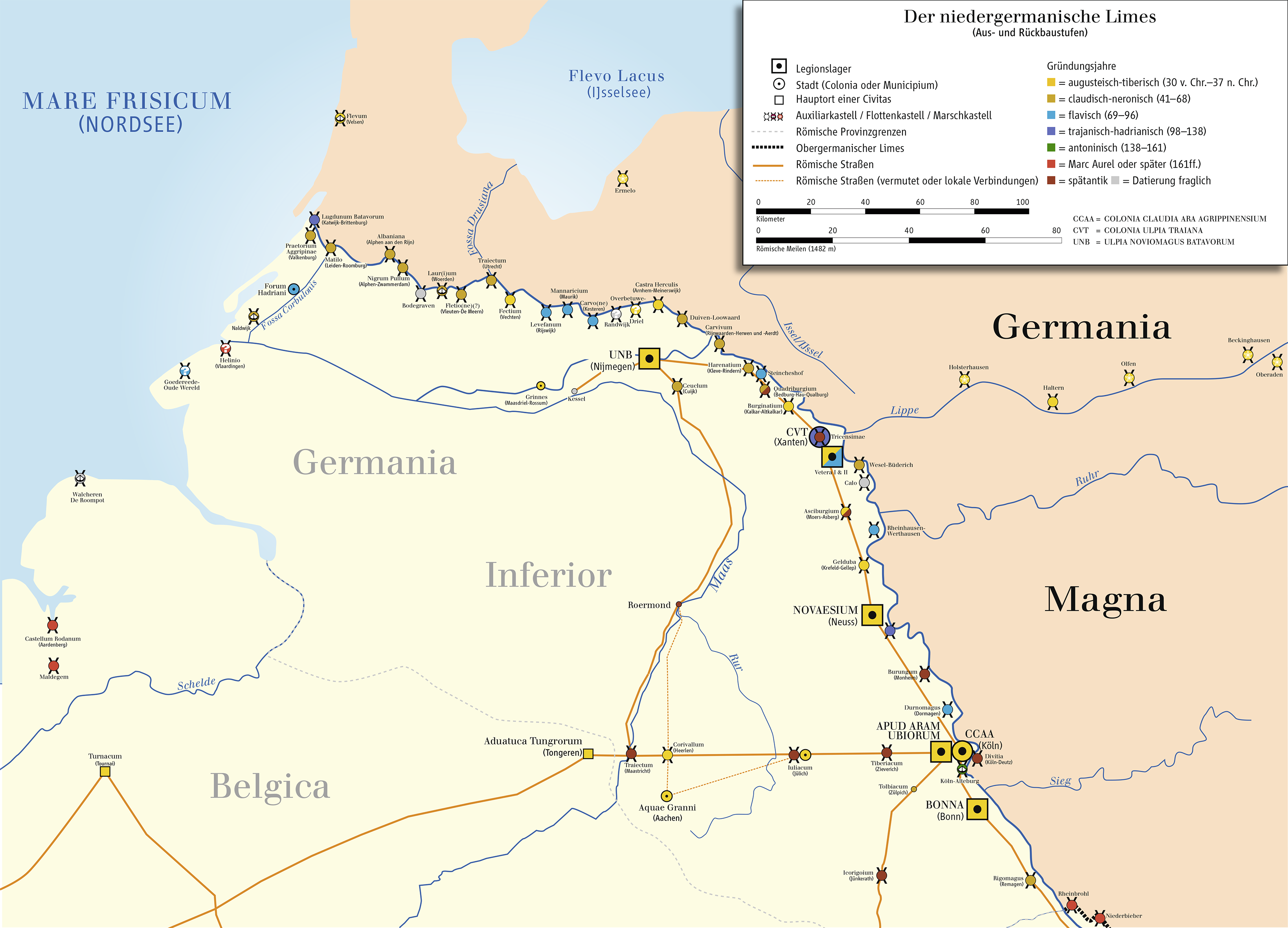
- Map of the Lower Germanic Limes
- Interactive map of Frontiers of the Roman Empire – The Lower German Limes
- Location: Germany, Netherlands
- Criteria: Cultural: (ii), (iii), (iv)
- Reference: 1631
- Inscription: 2021 (44th Session)

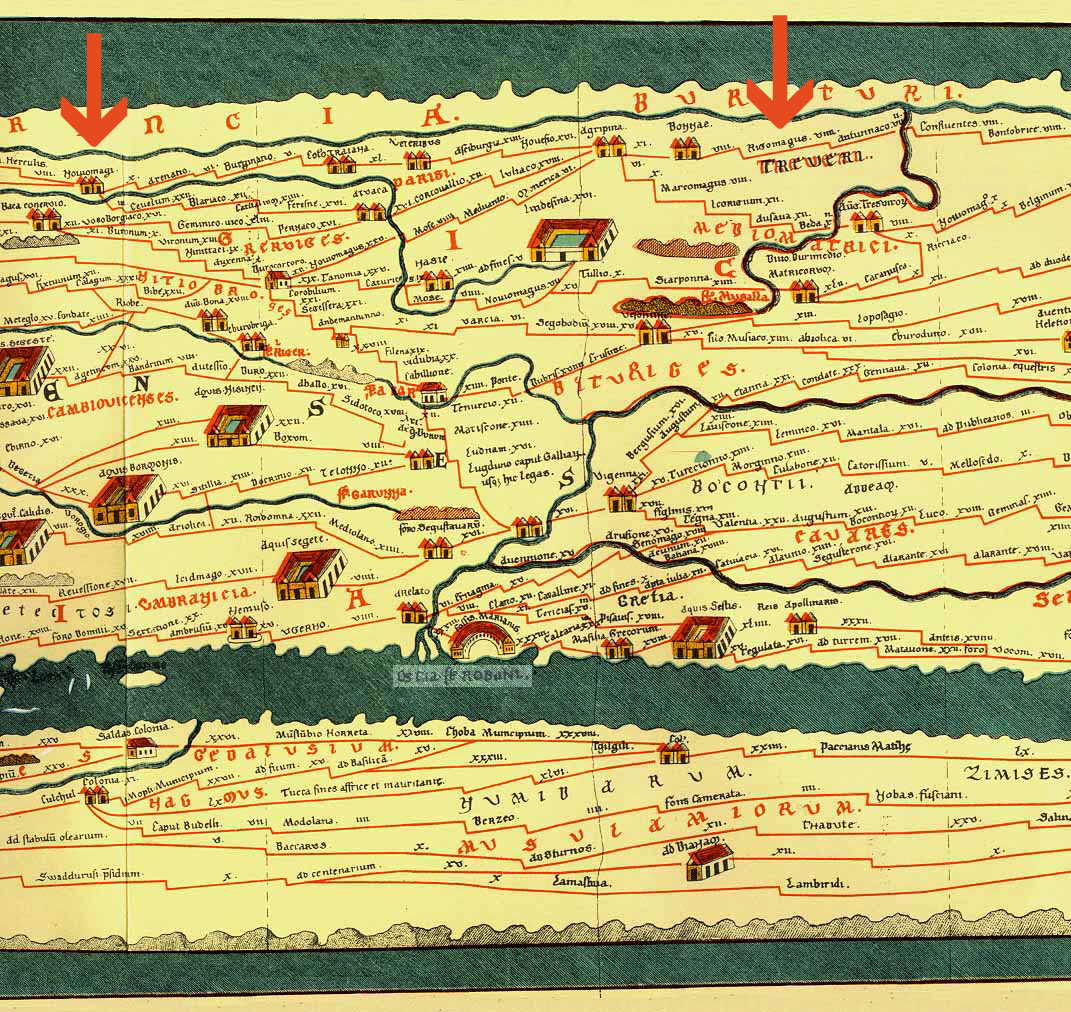
Southern section of the Lower Germanic Limes (between VLPIA NOVIOMAGVS BATAVORVM und RIGOMAGVS) on the Tabula Peutingeriana

The Lower Germanic Limes (Latin: limes ad Germaniam inferiorem, Dutch: Neder-Germaanse Limes, German: Niedergermanischer Limes) is the former frontier between the Roman province of Germania Inferior and Germania Magna. The Lower Germanic Limes separated that part of the Rhineland west of the Rhine as well as the southern part of the Netherlands, which was part of the Roman Empire, from the less tightly controlled regions east of the Rhine.

Note: limes is a Latin word of two syllables.

The route of the limes started near the estuary of the Oude Rijn on the North Sea. It then followed the course of the Rhine and ended at the Vinxtbach in present-day Niederbreisig, a quarter in the town of Bad Breisig, the border with the province of Germania Superior. The Upper Germanic-Rhaetian Limes then started on the opposite, right-hand, side of the Rhine with the Roman camp of Rheinbrohl.

The Lower Germanic Limes was not a fortified limes with ramparts, ditches, palisades or walls and watchtowers, but a river border (Lat.: ripa), similarly to the limites on the Danube and Euphrates. The Rhine Line was guarded by a chain of castra for auxiliary troops. It was laid out partly by Augustus and his stepson and military commander Drusus, who began to strengthen the natural boundary of the Rhine from the year 15 AD, The decision not to conquer the regions east of the Rhine in 16 AD made the Rhine into a fixed frontier of the Roman Empire. For its protection, many estates (villae rusticae) and settlements (vici) were established. The names and locations of several sites have been handed down, mainly through the Tabula Peutingeriana and Itinerarium Antonini.

Together with the Upper Germanic-Rhaetian Limes, the Lower Germanic Limes forms part of the Limes Germanicus. In 2021, the Lower Germanic Limes were inscribed on the UNESCO World Heritage List as part of the set of "Frontiers of the Roman Empire" World Heritage Sites.

== Topography ==
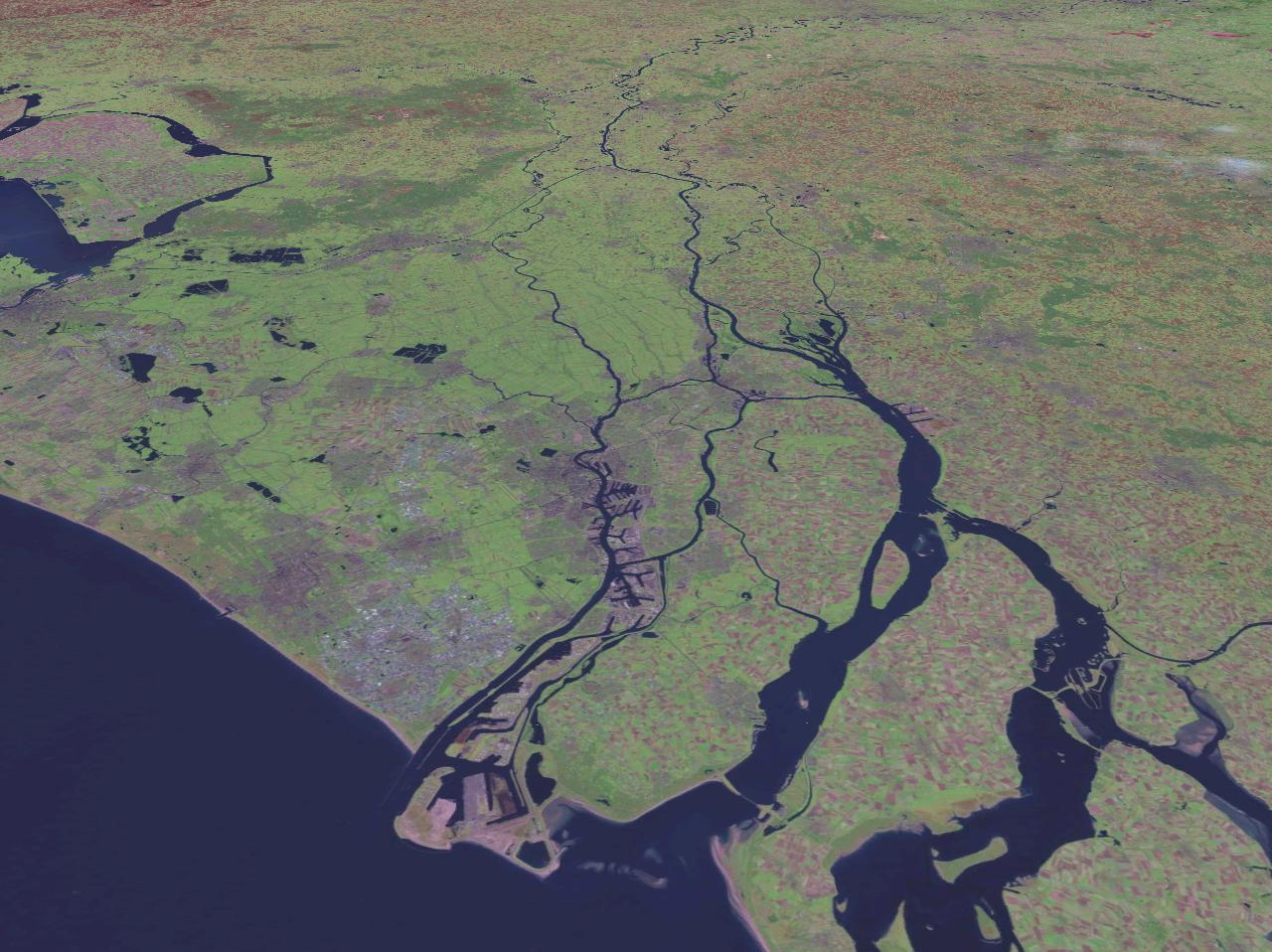
The Rhine-Meuse delta with the Lower Rhine in the background

As it runs along the Rhine the Lower Germanic Limes passes four landscapes with different topography and natural character. The southernmost and smallest portion, between the Vinxtbach and the area around Bonn still belongs to the Rhenish Massif, through which the river passes in a relatively narrow valley between the heights of the Westerwald and the Eifel Mountains. From roughly the area of Bonn, the Rhine valley opens into the Cologne Bay, which is bounded by the Bergisches Land, which hugs the river on the right-hand side, and the Eifel and High Fens to the southeast and east. The Cologne Bay has fertile loess soils and is characterized by a very mild climate. It is therefore little wonder that most of the rural vici and villae rusticae (farm estates) in Lower Germania were established in this area in Roman times. In the vicinity of the military camp of Novaesium, the Cologne Bay expands further into the Lower Rhine Plain, a river terrace landscape. Only a little west of today's German-Dutch border, roughly in the area of the legion camp of Noviomagus, the Lower Rhine Plain transitions into the watery marshland formed by the Rhine and Meuse and which finally ends at the North Sea in the Rhine-Meuse-Scheldt delta.

== UNESCO World Heritage Site (WHS) ==
In 2021, UNESCO accorded WHS status to the Lower Germanic Limes, identifying 44 properties (some being clusters of several sites) strung out along the 400km lower Rhine valley. The list identifies, and aims to preserve, a representative selection of places that had Roman military activities along this section of the frontier. They have integrity and authenticity in their archaeological remains and show how the Roman Empire introduced complex new technology and ways of living to the area. A distinctive features of the Lower Germanic Limes was the presence of the Rhine. This was at once both an identifiable defensible boundary, but also a highly porous one, which allowed the movement of peoples, trade and ideas. The river itself was a crucial means of transport through the region, and became a major supply route to the North Sea and Britain, controlled by the Roman Navy on the Rhine, the Classis Germanica.

As a transnational nomination, the sites are located in Netherlands and Germany. Care of the individual properties falls respectively on the Netherlands government and the German federal state of North Rhine-Westphalia (plus one site in Rhineland-Palatinate). This includes forts and marching camps dating back to the earliest arrivals of the Roman army in the area (around 16 BC) as well as development and rebuilding as more permanent fortifications were required at what became a fixed frontier rather than a staging post for the next conquest. Over the following four centuries the army brought with it industrial and engineering activities (Limekilns, pottery making, roads, canals, a naval base and a water supply aqueduct, for example). Civilian settlements, administrative, commercial, religious and entertainment sites also grew up alongside the more overtly military constructions.

The listed properties are each tightly defined around the specific features they are designed to protect. 106 individual sites are thus identified, although many of these are grouped as clusters of related features (multiple training camps, sections of canal, etc), giving a list of 44 places. Around each of the sites, and often joining the clusters into a coherent unit, the list identifies 'buffer zones'. These reach out beyond the specific protected site itself, and may protect views, settings or an overall context for a site or cluster, or could indicate unproven but possible areas where significant remains are yet to be discovered.

=== List of Netherlands sites ===
The following 19 sites/clusters fall within the modern jurisdiction of Netherlands. They are principally located on the Rhine-Meuse-Scheldt delta, characterised by flat alluvial plains. Waterlogged conditions have resulted in extremely good preservation of buried timber structures as well as ephemeral items buried in rubbish dumps.

Locations listed for the UNESCO World Heritage List: Lower Germanic Limes – Part 1: Netherlands
Site	Roman name	Modern-day location	Feature	Coordinates	Occupation time period	When investigated
1	possibly Pretorium Agrippine	Valkenburg-Centrum	Auxiliary fort. The list notes 4 excavated areas within the fort and adds a larger 'buffer zone' covering the whole fort and areas towards the vicus	52°10′48″N 4°25′59″E	AD 40 to late 3rd century	1946–51 plus 1962–80
2		Valkenburg-De Woerd	Military vicus (civil settlement, although this is a puzzling 1km away from the fort)	52°10′19″N 4°26′17″E	AD 50 to 250	1920s, 40s, 1972, 2019
3	Forum Hadriani, also known as Municipium Aelium Cananefatium (MAEC)	Voorburg-Arentsburg	Civil settlement in the Rhine-Meuse delta, with harbour frontage to access Corbulo's Canal	52°3′36″N 4°21′0″E	cAD 15 origins. Expansion under Hadrian (2nd century). Occupied to at least 400	1827–34, 1908–15, 1984–88, 2005–08.
4	Fossa Corbulonis (Corbulo's canal)	Voorschoten and Leidschendam-Voorburg	Canal linking the Meuse and Rhine rivers, constructed by Gnaeus Domitius Corbulo, some 34 kilometres (21 miles) in length. (Six protected sections over an 11km stretch between properties 3 and 5)	52°6′18″N 4°25′44″E	AD 47 – 50	1989 onwards.
5	Matilo	Leiden-Roomburg	Auxiliary Fort and civil settlement where Corbulo's Canal meets the Rhine	52°9′0″N 4°31′1″E	AD 70 (or before); 103/111; 200	1962 (channel); 1994–1997 (vicus); 1999, 2009 (stone fort).
6	Laurium (fort)	Woerden-Centrum	Auxiliary fort, largely undisturbed beneath the modern town. Delta conditions mean well-preserved timbers have survived	52°5′10″N 4°53′2″E	AD 39 (timber), 150 (stone) to 275	1975 onwards
7		Utrecht	2.5km section of the Limes road (a via militaris which ran along the left bank of the lower Rhine). It includes 3 sites with well preserved timbers of watchtowers, river revetments and sunken ships. Two rebuilding phases followed personal inspections by Trajan and Hadrian	52°5′10″N 5°0′29″E	cAD 85 (refurbished 99+ and 123+)	2000 onwards
8	possibly Fletio	Utrecht-Hoge Woerd	Auxiliary fort with associated settlement, bath house, cemeteries, and rubbish dumps	52°5′10″N 5°2′31″E	AD 40s to at least late 3rd century	1940s onwards
9		Utrecht-Groot Zandveld	Watchtower, some 3m (10ft) square, on a low hill with views of the former river channels	52°5′42″N 5°3′4″E	AD 40 to 70	1999, 2003, 2005
10	Traiectum	Utrecht-Domplein	Auxiliary fort, now under the town centre with some standing remains. The Roman military settlement became a major medieval town.	52°5′28″N 5°7′19″E	AD 40 to 3rd century	1929, 1933–49
11	Fectio	Bunnik-Vechten	Auxiliary fort with associated settlement, Limes road, quays, cemeteries, and rubbish sites	52°3′29″N 5°9′58″E	5 BC to 3rd century AD	1892-4 and 1st half of the 20th century
12	possibly Castra Herculis	Arnhem-Meinerswijk	Auxiliary fort and settlement, partly eroded by the shifting Rhine channel. Some of the fort now has reconstructed wall-lines	51°58′16″N 5°52′26″E	AD 10 to 3rd century	1979, 1991–2
13		Elst-Grote Kerk	Roman Temple, built on a pre-Roman sacred site and now occupied by a 15th century church	51°55′12″N 5°50′56″E	AD 50, rebuilt 100	1947
14	Oppidum Batavorum	Nijmegen-Valkhof area	Early Roman town (oppidum), capital of the Batavi. Also site of a late Roman fort	51°50′53″N 5°52′12″E	Oppidum: 10 BC to AD 70. Fort: late 3rd to 5th centuries AD	1910 (fort), 1940s onwards
15	Ulpia Noviomagus Batavorum	Nijmegen-Hunerberg	Earliest military fortification on the lower Rhine, briefly serving as the army's operational base. This was followed by a Legionary fortress and civil settlement from AD 70	51°50′24″N 5°53′2″E	19 to 12 BC. AD 70 to mid-2nd century	1916–20 and numerous post-war excavations
16		Nijmegen-Kops Plateau	Early fort with irregular shape, 'annexes' (military compounds outside the walls), residential blocks and a large assemblage of luxurious finds.	51°50′17″N 5°53′31″E	10 BC to AD 70	Mainly post-1946 excavations (esp 1986–95)
17		Berg en Dal aqueduct	Roman aqueduct, to transport running water 5.5 kilometres (3.4 miles) to the legionary fortress at Nijmegen. Embankments and cuttings carried wooden troughs from a reservoir near Groesbeek	51°49′5″N 5°54′0″E	AD 70 to mid-2nd century	2000-4
18		Berg en Dal-De Holdeurn	Military tile and pottery kilns, initially established by and for Xth legion, but later provided products for the whole lower Rhine army	51°49′1″N 5°55′59″E	late first century AD to third century	1938–42, 2015
19	Carvio ad molem ('Carvium near the groyne')	Herwen-De Bijland	Auxiliary fort located near a groyne which deflected the waters of the Waal into the Rhine, to maintain a navigable channel, built by Drusus. An inscribed gravestone and masonry fort defences have been found during gravel extraction.	51°52′52″N 6°5′56″E	Groyne (not found) was built 9 BC to AD 55	1939 (gravestone), 2015–16

=== List of sites in Germany ===
All but one of the German locations falls within the state of North Rhine-Westphalia (The Auxiliary fort at Remagen is in Rhineland Palatinate). Almost all of the sites are on the left (western) bank of the Rhine. Many of the military structures follow a similar chronology comprising a temporary camp with an earthen defensive boundary, replaced in the mid first century by timber defenses and later still by stone defences – particularly after the Revolt of the Batavi of AD 68–69. By the third century many military features were being abandoned, although some remained in use for a further 200 years. The civil settlements also persisted in use, and many have a direct successor in their modern settlements. In the 450s AD a Frankish invasion took control of Cologne, signaling the end of Roman control of the Lower Rhine. A number of sites can be matched with Roman place names, particularly from writers such as Tacitus and from ancient documents such as the map known as the Tabula Peutingeriana. The list below shows the 25 German sites (some individual places, some clusters of several component parts) that are now inscribed as part of the World Heritage Site.

Locations listed for the UNESCO World Heritage List: Lower Germanic Limes – part 2: Nord Rhein Westfalia, Germany
Site	Roman name	Modern-day location	Feature	Coordinates	Occupation time period	When investigated
20		Kleve-Keeken	Double-ditched marching fort (between 4 and 8 ha)	51°50′28″N 6°4′41″E	unknown	2016.
21		Kleve-Reichswald	2 sections of Roman Limes Road (over c1.5km)	51°47′28″N 6°5′35″E	Probably in use throughout the Roman occupation	2015 excavation.
22	Arenacum / Arenatium	Till (Bedburg-Hau)	Legionary fortress, fort, camps.	51°46′37″N 6°14′20″E	AD 70–180	2010. 2015 excavation trench.
23		Kalkar-Kalkarberg	Sanctuary/Temple to the Germanic war goddess Vagdavercustis	51°43′44″N 6°17′6″E	c12 BC to c AD 400	1980. 2000–2009 excavations.
24	Burginatium	Kalkar-Bornsches Feld	Auxiliary Fort, civil settlement, cemetery, limes road, fort (fleet base?)	51°42′50″N 6°19′8″E	1st to 3rd centuries	2005 and 2015 geophysical survey.
25		Uedem-Hochwald	A cluster of 13 individual marching camps, ranging from 0.5 to 2.5 ha (covers 15 properties) now in woodland	51°41′31″N 6°21′7″E	unknown	2012 laserscan.
26		Wesel-Flüren	4 marching camps from a cluster of at least 8, (size 1.2 to 2.5 ha), now in woodland on the east bank of the Rhine	51°40′55″N 6°33′32″E	unknown	2012 laserscan.
27	Colonia Ulpia Traiana ('CUT') and Tricensima	Xanten	Walled city, accorded Colonia (city) status, founded by Trajan next to the double legionary fortress of Vetera. A 4th century defensible fortress of Tricensima was built within the older city. The whole 90ha city area is now an open-air Archaeological Park	51°40′1″N 6°26′38″E	AD 100 (under Trajan (renamed in 110 by Marcus Ulpius Traianus), 4th century rebuilding	Excavation of City walls: 19th century; amphitheatre:1930s; Buildings within the archaeological park: from 1977.
28	Vetera Castra	Xanten-Fürstenberg	Vetera I was Lower Germany's largest legionary fortresses (c57ha), with space for two legions plus amphitheatre. After AD 70 This was replaced by a single-legion fortress (Vetera II) nearer the river, and the establishment of the Colonia to the north	51°38′35″N 6°28′12″E	Vetera I: 10 BC to AD 40; Rebuilt in stone: AD 40 to 70; Vetera II: AD 70 to at least 260	Antiquarians. 19th century. 1905–1930 (small trenches); 1960s onwards, aerial/Geophys surveying. Vetera II: 1955–58 underwater investigations.
29		Alpen-Drüpt	Two overlapping large temporary camps and an Auxiliary fort	51°35′13″N 6°32′46″E	Unknown	Camps: 1960s aerial photos. Fort: 2015 surveys and geophys.
30	Asciburgium	Moers-Asberg	Auxiliary Cavalry Camps, tented followed by timber fortress. Later stone Burgus tower.	51°25′55″N 6°40′12″E	16 BC to AD 85. Late 4th century Burgus.	1956–1981 excavations
31		Duisburg-Werthausen	Fortlet (0.3ha) formerly on the right bank of the Rhine. (Oxbow has since cut through, so on the modern left bank)	51°25′19″N 6°42′40″E	After AD 85 to 3rd century	1891, 1924 excavations
32	Gelduba	Krefeld-Gellep	Site of AD 70 battle of Gelduba, in the Batavian Revolt. An Auxiliary fort was built on the battlefield.	51°19′59″N 6°40′55″E	AD 70 to 5th century	Earliest excavations in 1934. Fort in 1964–68. Vicus 1977 and 2017.
33	Novaesium	Neuss	Successive legionary camps including the 'Koenenlager' – the first fully excavated Legionary Fortress (28.5ha) – and a later Auxiliary fort built within the abandoned fortress.	51°10′55″N 6°43′26″E	16 BC earliest camp. 43 AD: 'Koenen's Camp'. 2nd century Auxiliary fort.	1897–1900: Koenen's excavations. 1950s onwards: excavations at earlier camps.
34		Neuss-Reckberg	Small fort and nearby Watchtower which would have commanded views of the River, Limes Road and surrounding areas	51°10′34″N 6°45′58″E	1st to 2nd centuries	1885 excavation by Koenen
35		Monheim am Rhein	Late-Roman Fort. Substantial brickwork walls, corner towers and 8 interval towers, enclosing 2.5ha. Some walls remain to 4m, incorporated into a medieval Manor House, Haus Bürgel, open as a museum.	51°7′44″N 6°52′23″E	Early 4th to 5th centuries	Various excavations from 1953 onwards.
36	Durnomagus	Dormagen	Auxiliary fort (3.3ha) for some 500 cavalry soldiers. A later Burgus made use of a corner section of wall.	51°5′35″N 6°50′24″E	80s AD wooden fort rebuilt in stone by 150, bunt down in 161. Burgus in 3rd to 4th centuries	1963–1977 excavations
37	Praetorium at Colonia Claudia Ara Agrippinensium	Cologne	Palace of the Governor of Lower Germania province. It was the largest Roman building on the Lower Rhine, and is now amongst the best studied Roman buildings anywhere. An Underground museum of the foundations has been incorporated into the MiQua permanent exhibition under the Rathausplatz.	50°56′17″N 6°57′32″E	Early 1st century Legionary HQ, and the name continued for the Governor's palace of 80 AD, and rebuilds in 185 and mid-4th century. The building was in use until possibly 8th century.	Post-war reconstruction uncovered the foundations, with multiple subsequent discoveries over 65 years to the 2007–2018 museum excavations.
38	Castrum Divitia	Deutz, Cologne	4th century fort inaugurated by Constantine I to control a new Rhine Bridge to Colonia. The only fort on the Lower Rhine right bank. Standing remains were incorporated into a 9th century Church, and then in 1003, into Deutz Abbey.	50°56′17″N 6°58′12″E	AD 309–315 until mid 5th century	1879–1882, 1927–1938, 1967, 1976–1979, 2010–2015 excavations
39		Alteburg, Cologne	Fort fronting the Rhine, providing the permanent base for the Classis Germanica, the Roman fleet on the Rhine, 3km south of the Colonia	50°54′18″N 6°58′37″E	10 AD to 3rd century	1870–99 and multiple excavations through 20th century
40		Kottenforst Nord	Manoeuvring areas for training activities in the vicinity of Bonn legionary fortress. The walls of 12 separate training camps are preserved up to 0.5 m high.	50°43′1″N 6°58′41″E	1st and 2nd centuries	Laser scanning from 2008
41	Castra Bonnensis	Bonn	Legionary Fortress (27.8 ha) remaining on the same footprint over its 400 years in use. Base for Legio I Minervia. Bonn's streets still reflect the walls and roads of the fortress.	50°44′42″N 7°6′0″E	AD 35 to 430	First discovery and excavations in 1818, further excavations in 1903–1905; 1958/59; 2013–2014.
42		Kottenforst Süd	Manoeuvring area similar to that north of Bonn, with 10 separate training camps with areas ranging from 0.5 to 1.9ha and earth walls 0.5 m high.	50°39′32″N 7°5′38″E	1st and 2nd centuries	Laser scanning from 2008.
43		Iversheim	Limekilns to supply military construction for use along the whole lower Rhine area, via the river Erft. Six kilns of which three are now displayed in an exhibition building.	50°35′17″N 6°46′26″E	1st to 3rd centuries	excavated 1966–68.
44	Rigomagus	Remagen	Auxiliary fort (1.47 ha) in use from 1st to 4th centuries. Later (270 AD onwards) construction re-used the older wall foundations. some of which survive in the modern town.	50°34′48″N 7°13′41″E	1st to 4th centuries	Excavations from 19th century onwards.

== Literature ==
- Marinus Polak; Steve Bödecker; Lisa Berger; Marenne Zandstra; Tamar Leene (2021). Frontiers of the Roman Empire – The Lower German Limes: Nomination Text. UNESCO World Heritage Convention (Report).
- Tilmann Bechert: Germania inferior. Eine Provinz an der Nordgrenze des Römischen Reichs. Zabern, Mainz, 2007, ISBN 978-3-8053-2400-7.
- Tilmann Bechert, Willem J. H. Willems: Die römische Reichsgrenze von der Mosel bis zur Nordseeküste. Stuttgart, 1995, ISBN 3-8062-1189-2.
- Tilmann Bechert: Römisches Germanien zwischen Rhein und Maas. Die Provinz Germania inferior. (Edition Antike Welt, 4). Hirmer, Munich, 1982, ISBN 3-7774-3440-X.
- Julianus Egidius Bogaers, Christoph B. Rüger (eds.): Der niedergermanische Limes. Materialien zu seiner Geschichte. Rheinland Verlag, Cologne, 1974, ISBN 3-7927-0194-4.
- Michael Gechter: Die Anfänge des Niedergermanischen Limes. In: Bonner Jahrbücher. 179, 1979, pp. 1–129.
- Michael Gechter: Early Roman military installations and Ubian settlements in the Lower Rhine. In: T. Blagg, M. Millett (eds.): The early Roman empire in the West. 2. Auflage. Oxford Books 2002, ISBN 1-84217-069-4, S. 97–102.
- Michael Gechter: Die Militärgeschichte am Niederrhein von Caesar bis Tiberius. Eine Skizze. In: T. Grünewald, S. Seibel (eds.): Kontinuität und Diskontinuität. Die Germania inferior am Beginn und am Ende der römischen Herrschaft, Beiträge des deutsch-niederländischen Kolloquiums in der Katholieke Universiteit Nijmegen, 27. bis 30 June 2001. De Gruyter, Berlin, 2003, pp. 147–159 (Reallexikon der germanischen Altertumskunde, Ergänzungsband 35).
- Heinz Günter Horn (ed.): Die Römer in Nordrhein-Westfalen. Theiss, Stuttgart 1987; Lizenzausgabe. Nikol, Hamburg, 2002, ISBN 3-933203-59-7.
- Anne Johnson: Römische Kastelle des 1. und 2. Jahrhunderts n. Chr. in Britannien und in den germanischen Provinzen des Römerreiches. Zabern, Mainz, 1987, ISBN 3-8053-0868-X (Kulturgeschichte der antiken Welt, Vol. 37).
- Margot Klee: Grenzen des Imperiums. Leben am römischen Limes. Konrad Theiss Verlag, Stuttgart, 2006. ISBN 3-8062-2015-8. pp. 33–40.
- Hans Schönberger: Die römischen Truppenlager der frühen und mittleren Kaiserzeit zwischen Nordsee und Inn. In: Bericht der Römisch-Germanischen Kommission. 66, 1985, pp. 321–495.
