= Classis Germanica =

Naval fleet of the Roman Empire on the Rhine through to the Rhine–Meuse–Scheldt delta

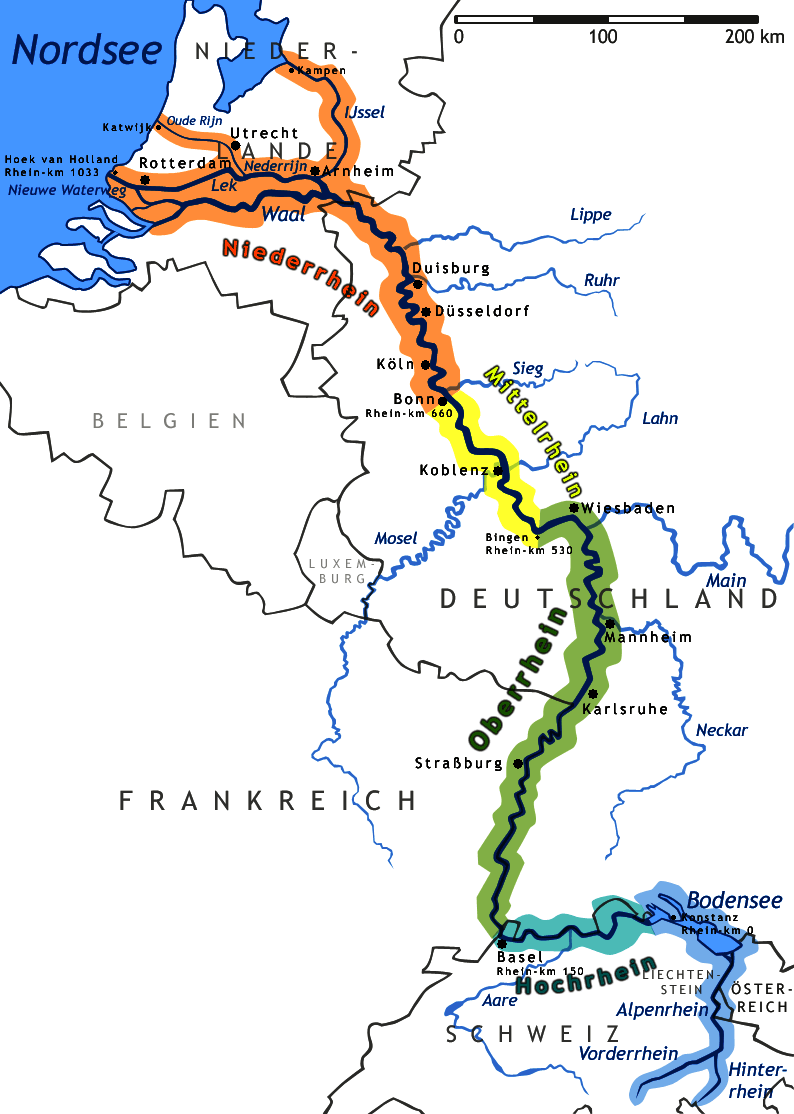
History of the Rhine and its tributaries

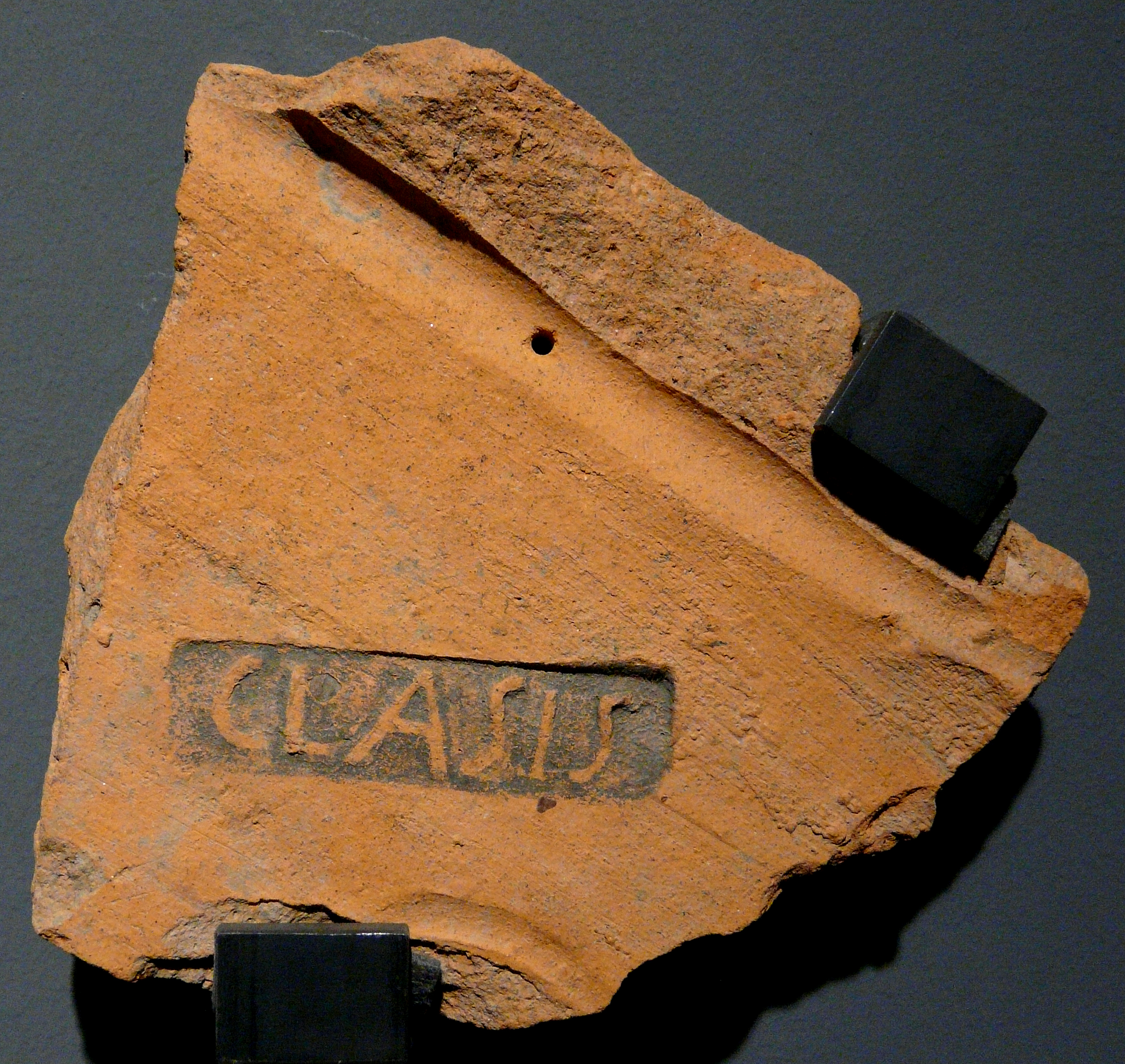
Tile with stamp CLAS(S)IS, from Novaesium, Clemens-Sels-Museum in Neuss

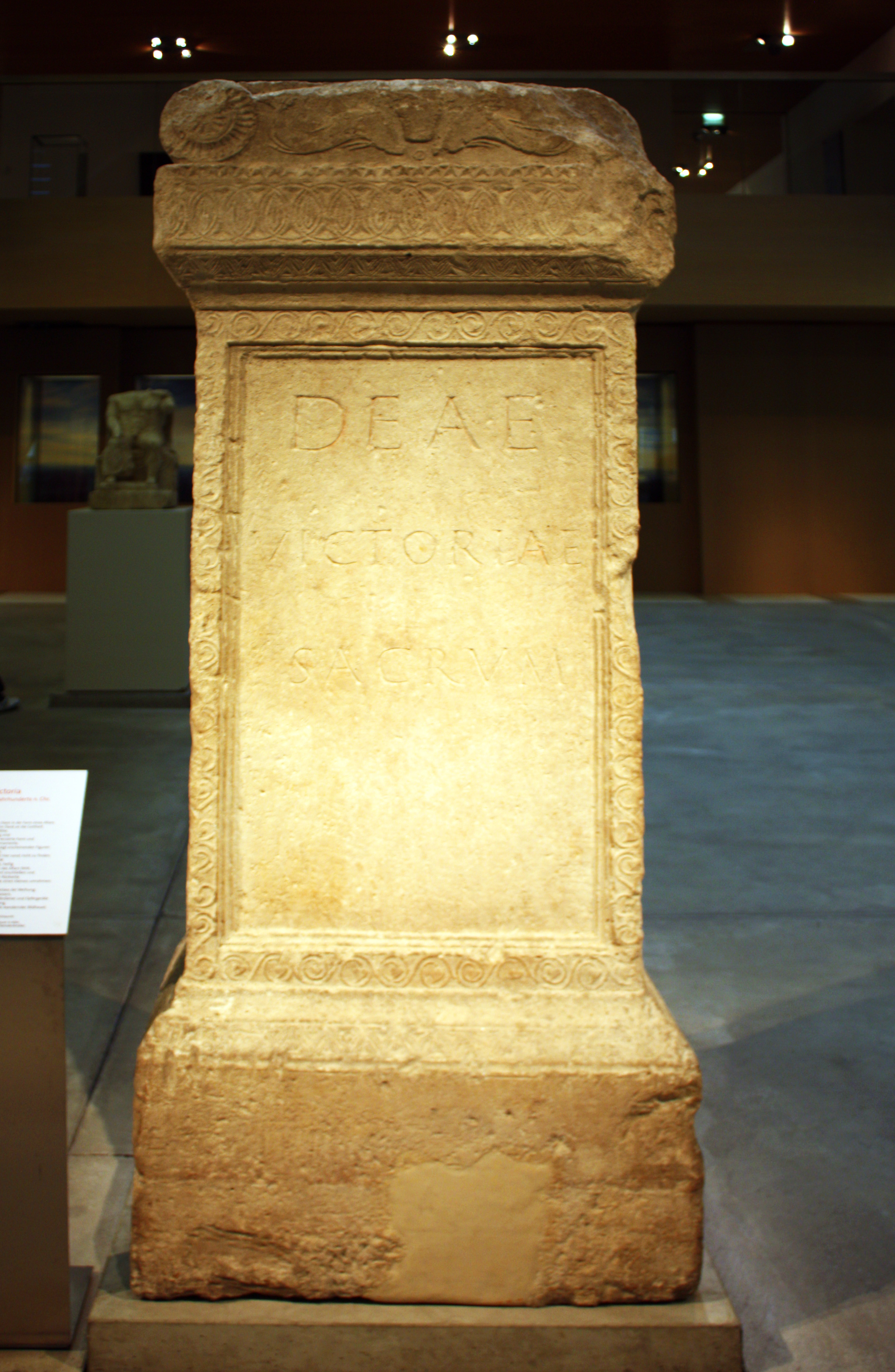
Altar of Victory from the fleet Castle Old Castle, 1st half of the 3rd century BC.

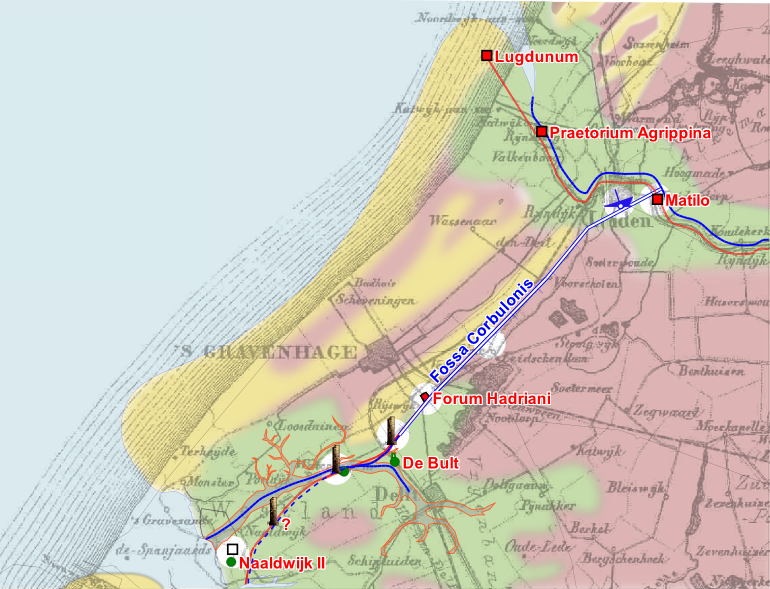
Map of Fossa Corbulonis

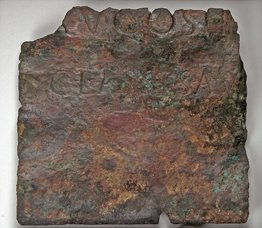
Fragment of a bronze plaque from Naaldwijk (NL) with the inscription CLASSISAV

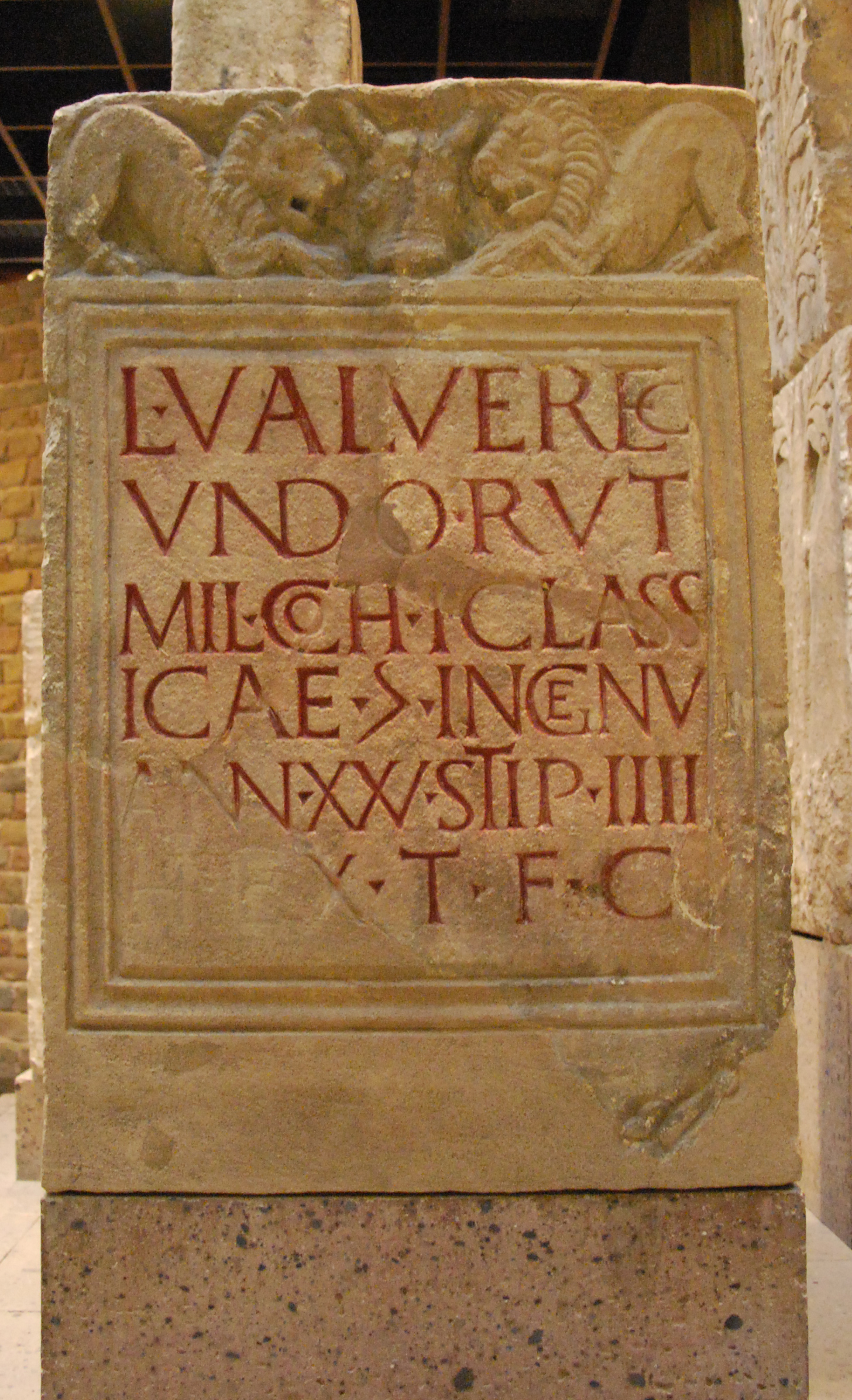
Grave stone of Marines L. Valerius Verecundus, died in service in the camp Cologne Alteburg.

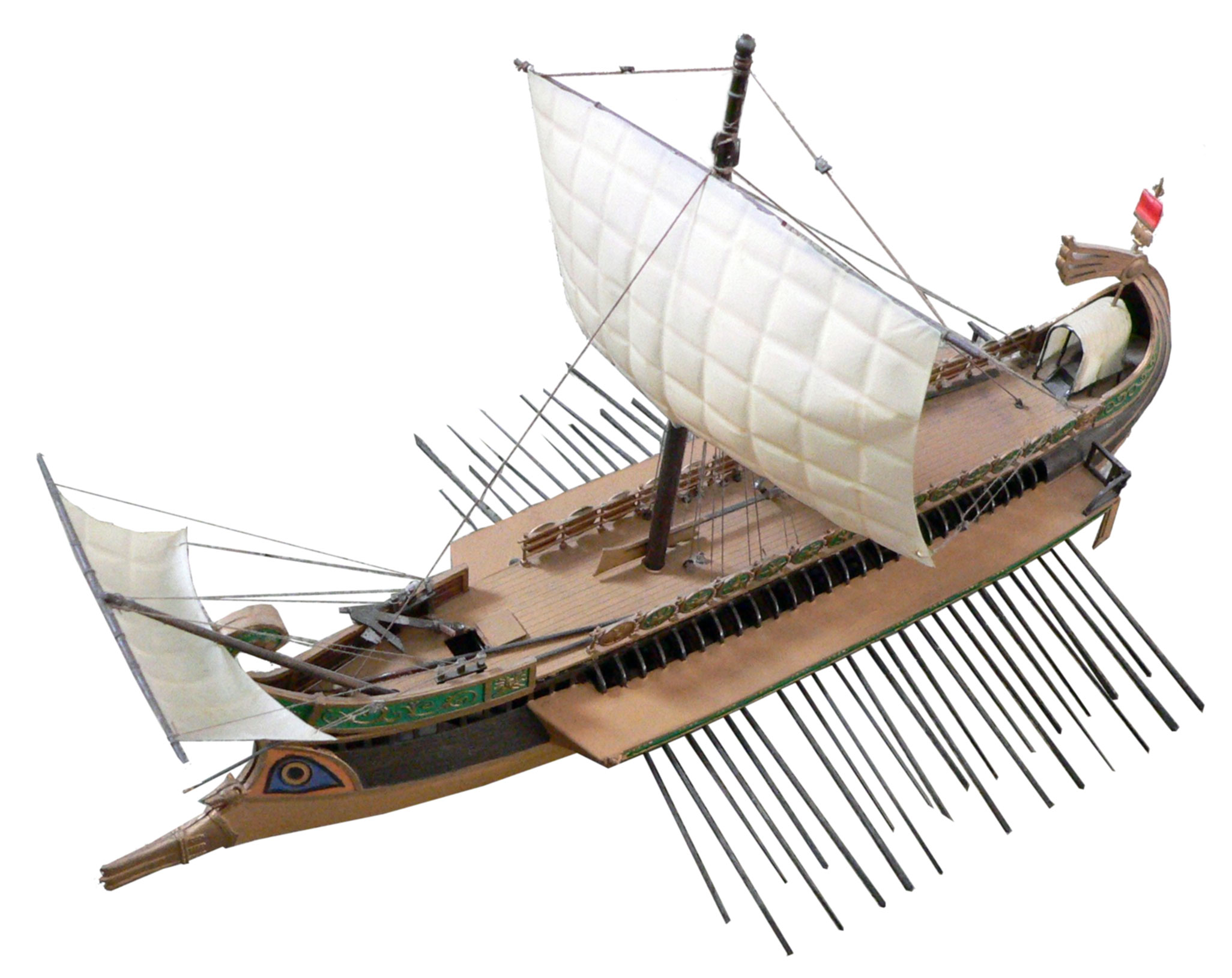
Roman trireme

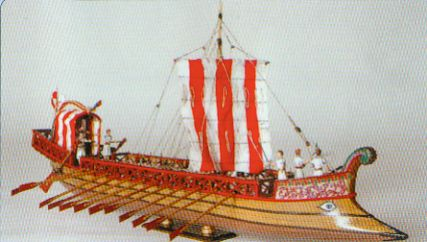
Roman river liburna

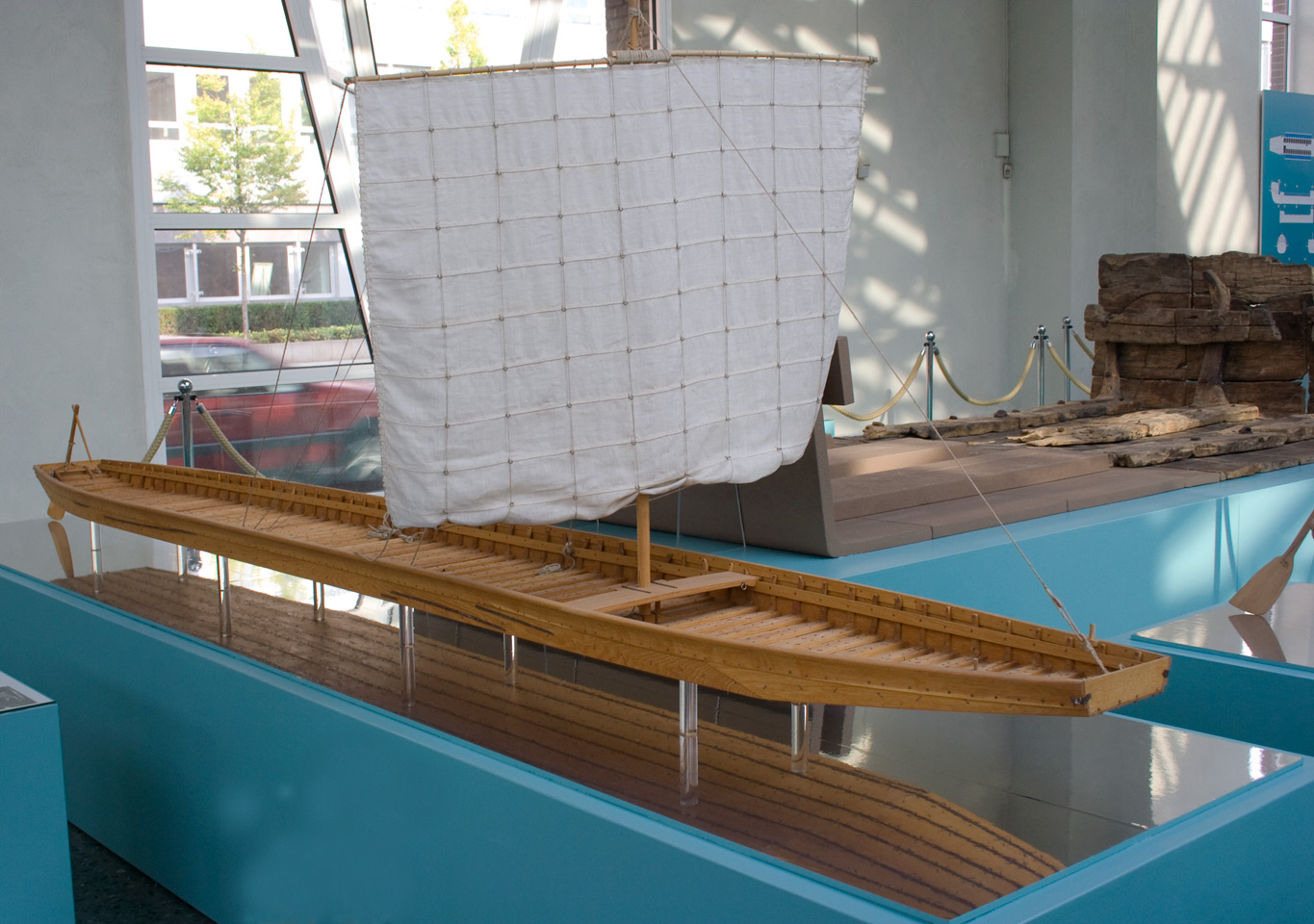
Model (front) and the original found object (rear right) of a Roman barge (flatboat, pram type Zwammerdam 6) from the 1st century

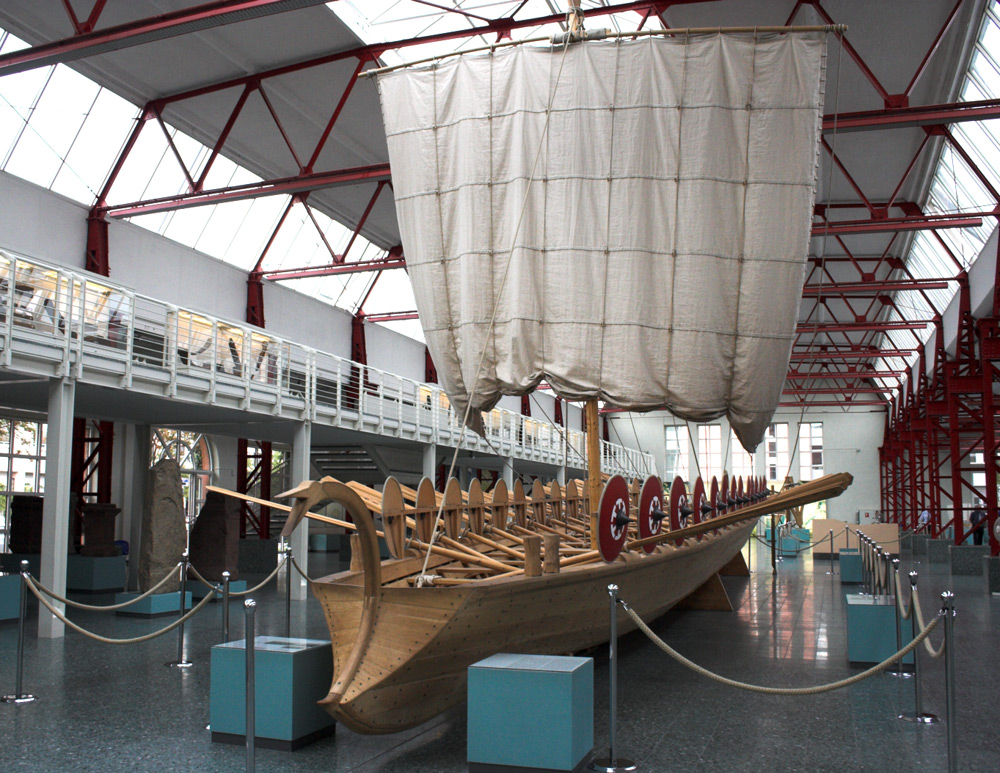
Reconstruction of Navis lusoria at the Museum of Ancient Shipbuilding, Mainz

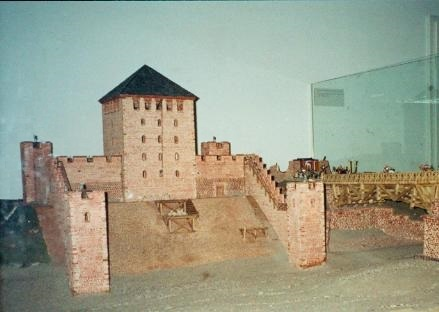
Reconstruction model of the late antique Ländeburgus of Ladenburg. For the bridge there is no archaeological evidence.

The Regina, the replica of a Navis lusoria by the University of Regensburg on a ride on the Frankish Brombachsee

The Classis Germanica was a Roman fleet in Germania Superior and Germania Inferior. Besides the Channel Fleet (Classis Britannica), it was one of the largest naval forces of the Roman Empire, ranking above all other provincial fleets.

The fleet was assembled in 13 BC, and was responsible for monitoring the entire Rhine from the confluence of the Vinxtbach and its navigable tributaries as well as the Zuiderzee and North Sea coastlines in the Rhine–Meuse–Scheldt delta. Later on, the estuaries on the right bank of the Rhine were also included in its charter in order to maintain a smooth flow of transportation and commerce on the river. The allegiance of the Classis Germanica to the Army of Germania Inferior (Exercitus Germaniae Inferioris) was confirmed by a Roman military diploma (located in the Netherlands) during Trajan's reign. Besides specifying the local auxiliary troops involved, it also lists the Rhine fleet, that likely was still in existence (in altered form) until the 4th century.

== Fleet operations ==
The Rhine fleet was formed in 13 BC, when Roman supreme command started gathering legions and ancillary troops along the banks of the river Rhine. From the beginning, the fleet, too, was involved in Roman campaigns. Its objective changed in 17 AD when Emperor Tiberius relinquished plans to invade the tribes east of the Rhine.

=== 1st to 2nd century ===
In Augustan times larger offensives were set in motion by the Romans. There were several large-scale landing operations of Roman troops from the North Sea, which were closely coordinated with land forces. In 12 BC, Drusus led the Rhine fleet through the canals of the Zuiderzee in the North Sea (fossa Drusiana). As the Frisii and Chauci had only primitive canoes, he sailed unhindered with his vastly superior forces into the mouth of the Weser (Visurgis) and forced both tribes into submission.

The advance of Tiberius at the Elbe (Albis) in 5 AD was accomplished by means of a combined land and sea operation. His fleet sailed the river to the area of Lauenburg and met up with the land army. During the same year, the Romans pushed even further north, reaching the Cimbri. The exact route and end point of the expedition are unknown. It is thought that they came up to the Skaw. The Cimbri were settled at that time in the north of Jutland. After circling the cape they found a large sea front, one the Romans, according to the chronicler Velleius Paterculus, "partly saw and partly knew from hearsay".

In 15 AD, a Roman army under the leadership of Germanicus advanced into Germania. The fleet transported four legions on the river Ems, who then marched to the site of the Battle of the Teutoburg Forest to bury the desecrated Roman soldiers that had died in the battle. After sustaining heavy losses fighting the Germanic tribes, they moved back to the Ems, where they were taken back on board the Classis Germanica. One year later under the command of legate Silius, Anteius and Caecina a fleet of a thousand ships were sent to dock at Kiel. The fleet included special innovations such as landing craft with flat bottoms and rudders at the stern and bow, ballista transporters, wide arks for cavalry horses, bridge material and food and gear. This transport fleet struck in spring 16 AD with Germanicus and an 8,000-strong army.

From the island of the Batavi (present-day Beveland and Walcheren in the Netherlands) the fleet pushed forward to the mouth of the Ems, where the Army was heading towards present-day Jemgum. After the battles at the Weser River and Angrivarian Wall (located between the Weser and Steinhuder Meer) in which the Angrivarii, Bructeri and Cherusci tribes were defeated, a part of the army should have been returned to their garrisons. However, almost the entire fleet as well as everyone on board fell victim to a storm. Germanicus himself was stranded in the settlement area of the Chauci tribe, but remained unharmed.

In 28 AD the Frisii rebelled against Roman rule. The Rhine fleet brought an expeditionary force in the revolting area, including to the besieged Roman port facility Flevum (Velsen). However, the frisii could not be stopped. The Romans lost control of the North Sea coast to the mouth of the Rhine.

Between 46 AD and 47 AD the Romans tried to subdue the Frisians but despite the use of the fleet, the Romans could not maintain their gains. The legate Gnaeus Domitius Corbulo built a 27 kilometer canal (Fossa Corbulonis) in 48 AD between the mouths of the Oude Maas and the Oude Rijn. It was used primarily for troop and supply transport.

During the Roman civil war (Year of the Four Emperors) in 68/69 AD, a riot among the allied Batavians under Julius Civilis spread to almost all other Germanic tribes along the Rhine. All forts north of Mogontiacum were besieged or destroyed. The Classis Germanica was severely limited by the low water level of the Rhine. Many of the Batavian and Roman auxiliaries proved unreliable and began deserting in large numbers to join the insurgents. The fleet contributed little to the hard-pressed Rhine legions. Among the legions sent to Lower Germany to crush the revolt were Adiutrix I and II, recruited from sailors. A whole squadron of Classis Germanica fell in 70 by treachery at the hands of the Batavians and was subsequently used against the Romans. The supreme commander of the army of the Rhine, Quintus Petillius Cerialis, was transported by the fleet of Classis Britannica with the Legio XIV Gemina and invaded the rebels on land. They fell into an ambush set by the Batavians Caninefaten's and were almost completely wiped out. Although Cerialis hurried from Novaesium with the Classis Germanica to assist, they were attacked during the night by the Batavians and lost all his ships, including Cerialis' own trireme. However, the lost ships were quickly replaced. The Batavians used their new fleet in an attempt to stop the supply transports of the Romans from Gaul in the Rhine delta. At the mouth of the Meuse (Mosa), the numerically inferior but better trained Classis Germanica fought the Batavian fleet in a brief skirmish. Civilis retreated to the northern bank of the Rhine and the Romans ravaged the area of the Batavians. The fleet was never able to achieve decisive successes in the Batavian revolt.

In 89 AD large sections of the army of the Rhine mutinied against Emperor Domitian. The Classis Germanica remained loyal to Domitian and helped to defeat the rebels. It was given the honorary title classis pia fidelis Domitiana.

=== 3rd to 4th century ===
After the end of the so-called Gallic Empire under Postumus and after numerous heavy incursions by the Franks, the Classis Germanica collapsed in the last third of the 3rd century. During this time, the Rhine legions employed their own naval detachments (milites liburnarii). Roman river warships were mentioned on the Rhine for the first time in 280 again, when Germanic invaders succeeded in setting several of the new navis lusoriae on fire.

Constantius I led the Rhine fleet against the Alemanni in 298 AD, who had settled on a river island. His son and successor Constantine the Great modernized the Rhine fleet and replaced the liburnarii entirely with lusoriae. This made the Upper Rhine fleet operational. In 306 Constantine brought troops across the Rhine and ravaged the settlement areas of the Bructeri tribe, before returning the Rhine fleet back into Germanic territory in 313.

In 355 AD Julian was named Caesar of the west. Under his rule the defense effort was increased. It was used for several campaigns and Rhine crossings: 356/357 found defensive battles take place on the Rhine and Main. In the winter of 357/358 Julian's troops joined a large group of Frankish marauders on the island in the Meuse (Dutch: Maas). Constantly patrolling, Lusorien prevented the permanent formation of a solid sheet of ice, so that the Franks were unable to escape across the river and had to finally surrender to the Romans after two months of siege. In 359 AD a squadron of 40 ships was used against the Alemanni.

In the time of Valentinian I, effort was put into making the fleet operational again. Around that time there was a new frontier defense concept that was based on the Rhine fleet and a string of left-bank bases and a large number of heavily fortified border forts. Warships patrolled from here almost constantly on the Rhine. Ports and forts in Speyer, Worms and Altrip built and the right bank borders Burgi in Zullestein, Mannheim-Neckarau and Ladenburg were built. There were repeated clashes with Germanic invaders, as some dedicatory inscriptions of the Rhine frontier testify. After the invasion of the Vandals, Suebi and Alans on New Year's Eve in 407, the fleet disbanded permanently.

== Officers and crew ==
Little is known about the chain of command of the Rhine fleet. The commander was a praefectus classis from the equestrian order, a procuratores centenarii, which meant he earned 100,000 sesterces a year. Below the prefect rank was the praepositus classis, each fleet usually having two of them. The future Emperor Pertinax served in the Classis Germanica as prefect. The officers each had their own staff and aides. In the 3rd century the rank of fleet tribunes was created (tribunus classis) who took over the duties of the first Nauarchs. Later he was called also tribunus liburnarum (tribune of warships).

The crew consisted of the officers (trierarchus), the rowers (remiges) and a centuria Marines (manipulares/milites liburnarii). The team (classiari/classici) were divided into two groups, the technical staff and the Marines. The service was 26 years (as opposed to the 20 to 25 years for a legionary). From the 3rd century it was 28 years, although occasionally it was even longer. After their honorable discharge (honesta missio) they were provided with either money or land and were also usually granted citizenship if they were free subjects of the Empire (peregrini). The ability to marry was also given to them after this.

== Type of ships ==
The types of vessels that made up the Rhine fleet consisted of freighters (navis actuaria), rafts, transports as well as some heavy warships. They could be rowed and sailed.

The most common type of ship in the 1st and 2nd centuries was the bireme or liburna (double-breasted), originally used by Illyrian pirates. It was quick and extremely manoeuvrable and equipped like all ancient battleships with a battering ram at the bow. Liburna were usually about 21 meters long, 3.30 meters wide and had a depth of about 0.7 meters. The crew consisted of 44 rowers, 4 sailors and 16 marines. Larger than the liburna were the triremes, which were very similar to the liburnians, but distinguished by a third, additional sail.

Cargo and load rafts could be up to 30m long, based on finds from Alphen Zwammerdam. Numerous wrecks on the Rhine and on Lake Neuchatel testify to the use of barge boats in Roman times. These were box-shaped ships with mast, shallow draft and ramped ends on both sides of the fuselage, which had a payload up to 30t.

From the 3rd century, the much smaller navis lusoria formed the backbone of the late Roman fleet.

== Role ==
The main role of the fleet was to ensure freedom of navigation along the Rhine, Scheldt and Meuse rivers and their tributaries, and continuing on up the coastline to Zuiderzee and the North Sea. With the end of plans to conquer the right bank of Germania Magna under Tiberius, the Romans altered the role of the Classis Germanica to deal chiefly with daily patrols on the Rhine, and operations along the North Sea Coast dwindled in importance.

Even more important than its use in military campaigns was the logistical role of the Rhine fleet ever since the period of Drusus's Germania offensives. From Vetera (Modern day Xanten) the forts were supplied. The docks were often fortified. The fleet was also used for civil transport, for example moving stones were obtained from the quarries of Brohl Valley in Siebengebirge. Even foods like corn and wine, which could be moved only with difficulty by land, were transported.

== Tactics ==
With the beginning of the reign of the Flavian dynasty in the last third of the 1st century, the situation had largely stabilized at the Rhine frontier again. The fleet was mostly concerned now with the extraction and transportation of building materials, since the freight cost by water were much lower than by land (approximately 1/6 of road tariffs), although they continued to provide a river patrol service.

In 270 AD, the Classis Germanica in its original format was dissolved. Its area of operations had been largely confined until then on the Lower Rhine. After abandoning Agri Decumates the strategic situation changed. A concentration of the fleet on a few key points was no longer useful. Due to the new situation on the Rhine, wide sections of the river, but also the mouths of the Barbaricum waters now had to be strictly monitored. Unlike the high and middle Rhine, the tortuous course of the Upper Rhine and its dense floodplain made effective monitoring by castles impossible. These new challenges were overcome only through constant military presence on the river and on its banks.

This promising new approach to border protection along the Rhine was therefore a decentralized forward defense. By giving up the doctrine of central massing of the fleet and their distribution to smaller castles and burgi, numerous units were concentrated at focal points of the border in case of need within a few hours. These were quick to alert in case of emergency by the neighboring castles or watchtowers. This was best achieved with the smaller and more mobile navis lusoria, with which one could also deal with potential intruders either right on the Rhine or in amphibious operations, together with land forces.

The daily range of river battleships was up to 15 kilometres (9.3 mi). The distance between forts or border burgi averaged 15 to 30 kilometres (19 mi). Downriver a navis lusoria could reach the nearest base in about 75–150 minutes. Upriver would require 2–4 hours. With effective communication, it was possible for the High Command to bring at least four patrol boats to vulnerable locations in this time and so at the beginning of the battle up to 100 naval detachments (milites liburnarii) could be deployed. It was therefore possible that the aggressor could be under engaged shortly after their appearance on the Rhine from the Roman border protection. Due to the superiority of their lusoriae, under the right conditions the Limitanei were able to confront even vastly numerically superior Barbarian forces.

Due to the flat bottom construction of the Roman lusoria it was also possible, during an armed reconnaissance mission for example, to venture into Barbaricum waters. These inflows were often used by the Germanic tribes as an approach route for their surprise attacks on Roman territory. The findings from this kind of "maritime warning system" were certainly highly valued by the Roman commanders. Another protection were the then widely ramified, sometimes almost impenetrable and marshy floodplain of the Upper Rhine and the presence of numerous meandering tributaries, which also considerably more difficult to approach the border zone.

Furthermore, in a fight the Germanic tribes on the Rhine couldn't muster anything remotely equivalent to the Romans' highly developed river-going battleships. Had the invaders somehow managed to overcome all these difficulties, there was still the possibility that they could be intercepted at the very last moment back on the Rhine again on the return trip from one of their marauding attacks, and have all their booty confiscated, just to see it redistributed among the border soldiers who had taken part in the battle (see also Hortfund von Neupotz).

== Naval bases ==
The headquarters of the Classis Germanica was originally located in Castra Vetera (in Xanten), later in the Alteburg naval fort about 1,5 km south of ancient Cologne. The main city of Germania Inferior was Colonia Claudia Ara Agrippinensium (CCAA - nowadays Cologne), capital of the province, an important economic center and a trading center of great national importance. The Rhine in turn served not only as an important transport route for the transport of goods produced in Cologne, but also for the import of goods from other provinces. Late Antiquity bases included Mainz / Straubing, Speyer and Passau. After the Battle of Mursa Major in 351 AD the naval port in Mainz was expanded and became a major base for the Rhine fleet. The naval base in Mainz was used mainly in the second half of the 3rd and the 4th century. The newly organized Rhine fleet in the first third of the 4th century was their primary source of power the central portion of the Rhine was occupied periodically with castles as supply bases and safe havens. Without this support, an effective use of the Rhine fleet would have been impossible. It is believed that the late antiquity (left bank) fortifications between Bingen and Bonn were built during the reign of Constantine I's sons (ca. 320–350) according to a uniform plan.

== See also ==
- Classis Flavia Moesica
- Defence-in-depth (Roman military)
- Fall of the Western Roman Empire
- Franks
- Germanic tribes
- Germanic wars
- Late Roman army
- List of Roman auxiliary regiments
- Tacitus

== Bibliography ==
- Bechert, Tilmann (2007). Germania Inferior, eine Provinz an der Nordgrenze des Römischen Reiches [Germania Inferior, a province on the northern border of the Roman Empire]. Mainz: Philipp von Zabern, ISBN 978-3-8053-2400-7.
- Bockius, Ronald (2006). Die spätrömischen Schiffswracks aus Mainz. Schiffsarchäologisch-technikgeschichtliche Untersuchung spätantiker Schiffsfunde vom nördlichen Oberrhein [The late Roman shipwrecks from Mainz. Ship-archaeological and technical-historical investigation of late antique ship finds from the northern Upper Rhine]. Monographien des RGZM, vol. 67. Mainz: Verlag des RGZM, ISBN 978-3-88467-102-3.
- Bockius, Ronald; Baatz, Dietwulf (1997). Vegetius und die römische Flotte [Vegetius and the Roman fleet]. Monographien des RGZM, vol. 39. Bonn: Habelt, ISBN 3-88467-038-7.
- D'Amato, Raffaele; Sumner, Graham (2009). Imperial Roman Naval Forces 31 BC – AD 500. Oxford: Osprey Publishing, ISBN 978-1-84603-317-9.
- Heukemes, Berndmark (1981). "Der spätrömische Burgus von Lopodunum, Ladenburg am Neckar, Vorbericht der Untersuchung von 1979" [The late Roman burgus of Lopodunum, Ladenburg am Neckar, preliminary report of the 1979 investigation]. In: Festschrift für Hartwig Zürn. Fundberichte aus Baden-Württemberg, vol. 6. Stuttgart: Schweizerbart, ISBN 3-510-49106-8.
- Höckmann, Olaf (1986). "Römische Schiffsverbände auf dem Ober- und Mittelrhein und die Verteidigung der Rheingrenze in der Spätantike" [Roman ship formations on the Upper and Middle Rhine and the defence of the Rhine border in Late Antiquity]. In: Jahrbuch des Römisch-Germanischen Zentralmuseums Mainz 33, pp. 369–416.
- Konen, Heinrich Clemens (2000). Classis Germanica. Die römische Rheinflotte im 1.–3. Jahrhundert n. Chr. [Classis Germanica. The Roman Rhine fleet in the 1st-3rd century AD]. Pharos, vol. 15. St. Katharinen: Scripta Mercatura, ISBN 3-89590-106-7.
- Pflaum, H.G. (1950). Les procurateurs équestres sous le Haut-Empire romain.
- Prammer, Johannes (1987). Gäubodenmuseum, Straubing. Abteilung Vorgeschichte [Gäuboden museum at Straubing: Department for prehistory]. Straubing.
- Prammer, Johannes (1996). Länden, Hafenanlagen und Hafenprojekte in Straubing [Moorage places, harbour facilities and port projects in Straubing]. Straubing.
- Schäfer, Christoph (2008). Lusoria, ein Römerschiff im Experiment [Lusoria, a Roman ship in experiment]. Hamburg: Koehlers, ISBN 978-3-7822-0976-2.
- Tacitus, Publius Cornelius (1895), Church, Alfred John; Brodribb, William Jackson (eds.), Annals of Tacitus (translated into English), London: MacMillan and Co.
