= Fossa Mariana =

Historic canal

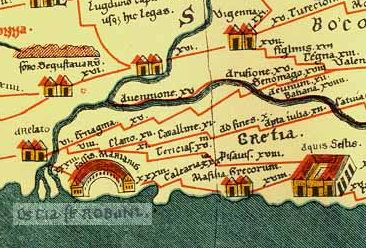
Fossa Mariana Canal

The Fossa Mariana (Latin for "trench of Marius") was a canal made B.C. 102, by Marius, from the Rhône to the Gulf of Stomalimne, near the modern city of Fos-sur-Mer. It was constructed to avoid the difficult navigation at the mouths of the river, caused by the accumulations of sand by the several streams. It was about 16 miles long and was later given to the inhabitants of Massilia (modern Marseille), who derived large revenues from it.

== See also ==
- List of Roman canals
