= List of Roman canals =

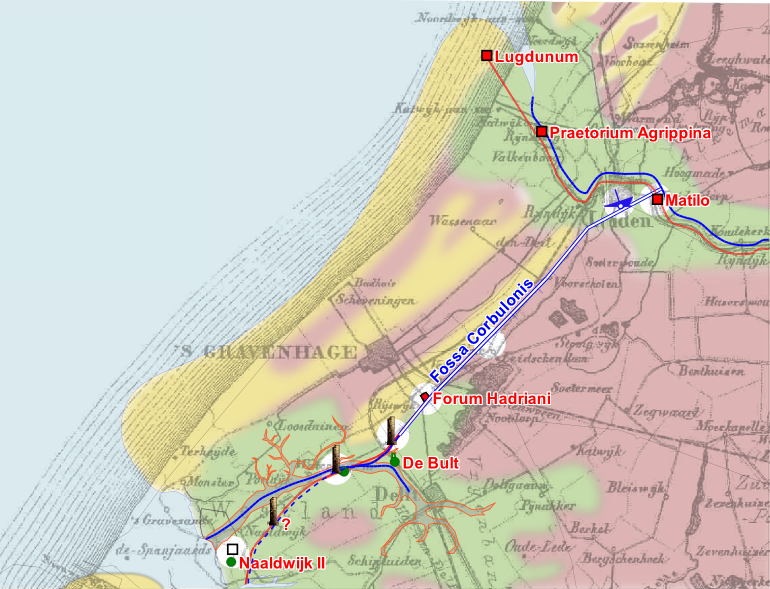
The Fossa Corbulonis connected the Rhine and the Meuse on the Dutch coast.

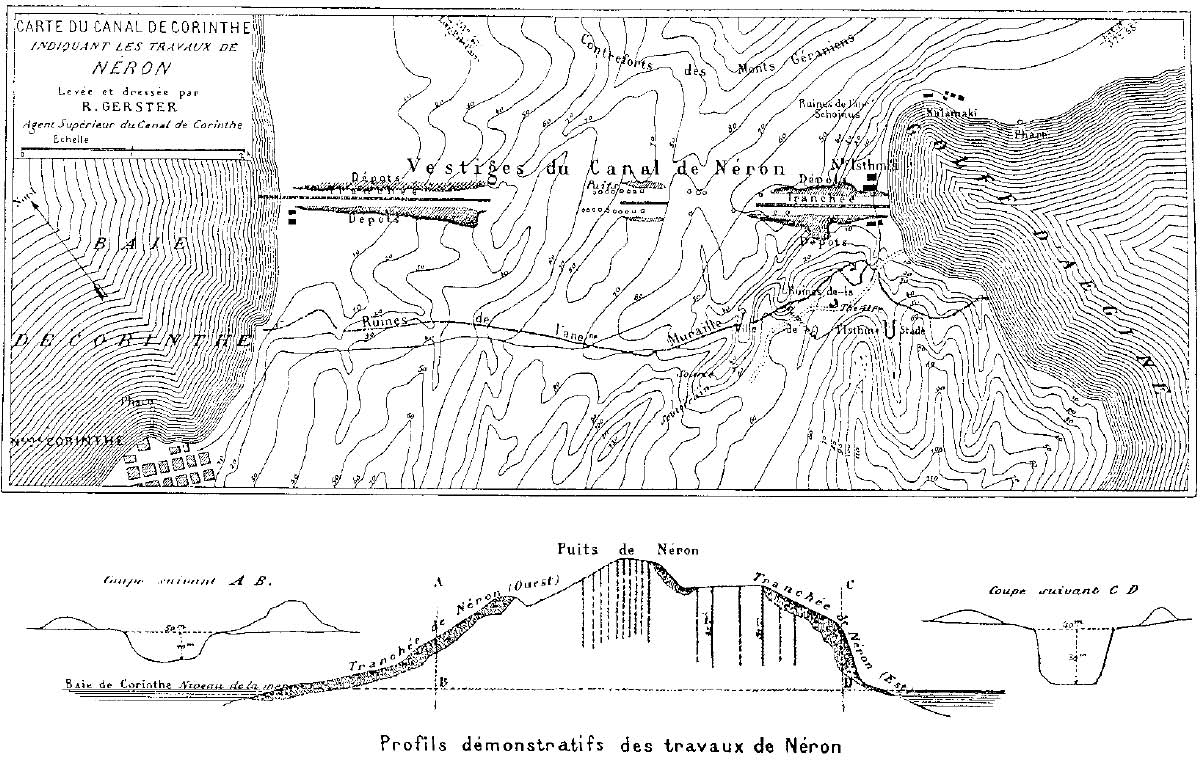
Remains of Nero's unfinished Corinth Canal project, which followed exactly the same course as the modern canal.

This is a list of Roman canals. Roman canals were typically multi-purpose structures, intended for irrigation, drainage, land reclamation, flood control and navigation where feasible. This list focuses on the larger canals, particularly navigational canals, as recorded by ancient geographers and still traceable by modern archaeology. Channels which served the needs of urban water supply are covered at the List of aqueducts in the Roman Empire.

Greek engineers were the first to use canal locks, by which they regulated the water flow in the Ancient Suez Canal as early as the 3rd century BC. The Romans under Trajan too secured the entrance to the Red Sea with sluice gates, while they extended the canal south to the height of modern Cairo in order to improve its water inflow. The existence of ancient pound locks to bridge height gaps has been proposed by a number of authors, but in the absence of clear archaeological evidence the question seems to be permanently undecided.

== Canals ==
By chronological order:

=== Italy ===
Construction date	Connection	Canal type	Comment	Refs.
2nd century BC	South of line Modena–Parma	Drainage	Built by Marcus Aemilius Scaurus to drain lower Po area	
2nd century BC	Bologna, Piacenza and Cremona areas	Drainage	Built by Marcus Aemilius Lepidus to drain lower Po area	
1st century BC	Forum Appii–Terracina	Drainage	For dewatering Pomptine Marshes; navigated when Via Appia unusable by mule-towing	
Late 1st century BC	Ferrara–Padua	Inland to coast	Built by Augustus to link Ravenna and Po estuary (Fossa Augusta)	
Before late 1st century AD	Fossa Flavia, Fossa Carbonaria, Fossa Philistina, Fossa Clodia	Drainage	According to Pliny the Elder for draining Po estuary; erosion and siltation renders modern identification impossible	

=== Gaul ===
Construction date	Connection	Canal type	Comment	Refs.
101 BC	Rhone–Fos-sur-Mer (Fossa Mariana)	Inland to coast	Built by Marius across Crau plain for supplying his positions around Arles in his campaign against Teutons	
?	Narbonne–Aude	Inland to coast	Made Narbonne accessible from Mediterranean; 13 km long	

=== Germania ===
Construction date	Connection	Canal type	Comment	Refs.
12 BC	Rhine–IJssel (Fossa Drusiana)	Inland to coast	For quick deployment of troops to the Frisian coast, avoiding the dangerous passage on the North Sea off the mouth of the Rhine; 14 km long	
c. 9 BC	Rhine dyke	Inland	Built by Drusus the Elder to retain sufficient water to navigate his Fossa Drusiana; demolished by revolting Civilis in 70 AD	
47 AD	Rhine–Meuse (Fossa Corbulonis)	Inland	Allowed to navigate both rivers without sailing into North Sea; c. 35 km long	

=== Britain ===
Construction date	Connection	Canal type	Comment	Refs.
c. 1st century AD	River Cam–River Ouse (Car Dyke)	Drainage	Land reclamation in Fenland; also navigated	
?	River Ouse–River Nene	Drainage		
?	River Nene–River Witham	?		
?	River Witham–River Trent	?	Foss Dyke still in use	
?	Bourne-Morton Canal	Navigation		

=== Egypt ===
Construction date	Connection	Canal type	Comment	Refs.
No later than 112 AD	Nile–Red Sea (Ancient Suez Canal)	Inland to coast	As the older Ptolemaic channel, which was the first to use locks, Trajan's canal linked Mediterranean and Red Sea not directly, but via the Nile. Unlike the Greek channel, though, which branched off the Pelusiac arm, the Roman canal started off the main branch of the Nile at Babylon, 60 km to the south. It joined the Ptolemaic dyke at Belbeis, eventually discharging into the Gulf of Suez at Arsinoe.	

=== Moesia ===
Construction date	Connection	Canal type	Comment	Refs.
101 AD	Danube bypass canal	Inland	To safely negotiate the cataracts of the Iron Gate; once traceable on Serbian bank (Sip) on a length of 3,220 m	
2nd–6th century AD	Danube bypass canal	Inland	According to Procopius for allowing the safe passage past the remains of Trajan's Bridge which obstructed river navigation; dug on Serbian side (Kladovo)	

== Projected canals ==
In the following, Roman canal projects which were never completed for various reasons are listed.

Planning date	Connection	Canal type	Comment	Refs.
c. 54–68 AD	Rome–Ostia	Inland to coast	Planned by Nero	
c. 54–68 AD	Puteoli–Ostia	Inland to coast	Starting from Lake Avernus near Puteoli, it was intended by Nero to run parallel to Mediterranean; length upon completion would have been 160 Roman miles	
c. 54–68 AD	Isthmus of Corinth (modern Corinth Canal)	Coast to coast	To avoid long and dangerous circumnavigation of the Peloponnese peninsula; several abandoned building projects in antiquity aimed at replacing Diolkos trackway; serious work begun by Nero, but aborted after his death	
55 AD	Saône–Moselle (modern Canal de l'Est)	Inland	Another ambitious project: would have connected Mediterranean Sea with North Sea via Rhone, Saône, Moselle and Rhine; presupposes capacity to construct pound locks though, for which there is as yet no certain evidence; yet, plan finally dropped not due to technological reasons, but political intrigues	
111 AD	Lake Sapanca–Sea of Marmara	Inland to coast	For facilitating transfer of inland produce to seaside; subject of correspondence between governor Pliny the Younger and emperor Trajan; would have required to overcome difference in height of 32 m	

== See also ==
- Record-holding canals in antiquity

== Sources ==
- Froriep, Siegfried (1986): "Ein Wasserweg in Bithynien. Bemühungen der Römer, Byzantiner und Osmanen", Antike Welt, 2nd Special Edition, pp. 39–50
- Grewe, Klaus (2008): "Tunnels and Canals", in: Oleson, John Peter (ed.): The Oxford Handbook of Engineering and Technology in the Classical World, Oxford University Press, pp. 319–336, ISBN 978-0-19-518731-1
- Moore, Frank Gardner (1950): "Three Canal Projects, Roman and Byzantine", American Journal of Archaeology, Vol. 54, No. 2, pp. 97–111
- Schörner, Hadwiga (2000): "Künstliche Schiffahrtskanäle in der Antike. Der sogenannte antike Suez-Kanal", Skyllis, Vol. 3, No. 1, pp. 28–43
- Serban, Marko (2009): "Trajan’s Bridge over the Danube", The International Journal of Nautical Archaeology, Vol. 38, No. 2, pp. 331–342
- Tudor, D. (1974): Les ponts romains du Bas-Danube, Bibliotheca Historica Romaniae Études, Vol. 51, Bucharest: Editura Academiei Republicii Socialiste România, pp. 47–134
- White, K. D. (1984): Greek and Roman Technology, London: Thames and Hudson, pp. 110–112; 227–229, table 6
- Wikander, Charlotte (2000): "Canals", in Wikander, Örjan (ed.): Handbook of Ancient Water Technology, Technology and Change in History, Vol. 2, Leiden: Brill, pp. 321–330, ISBN 90-04-11123-9
