= Canal of Drusus =

Roman canals constructed by Nero I

Coordinates: 51°57′N 5°58′E

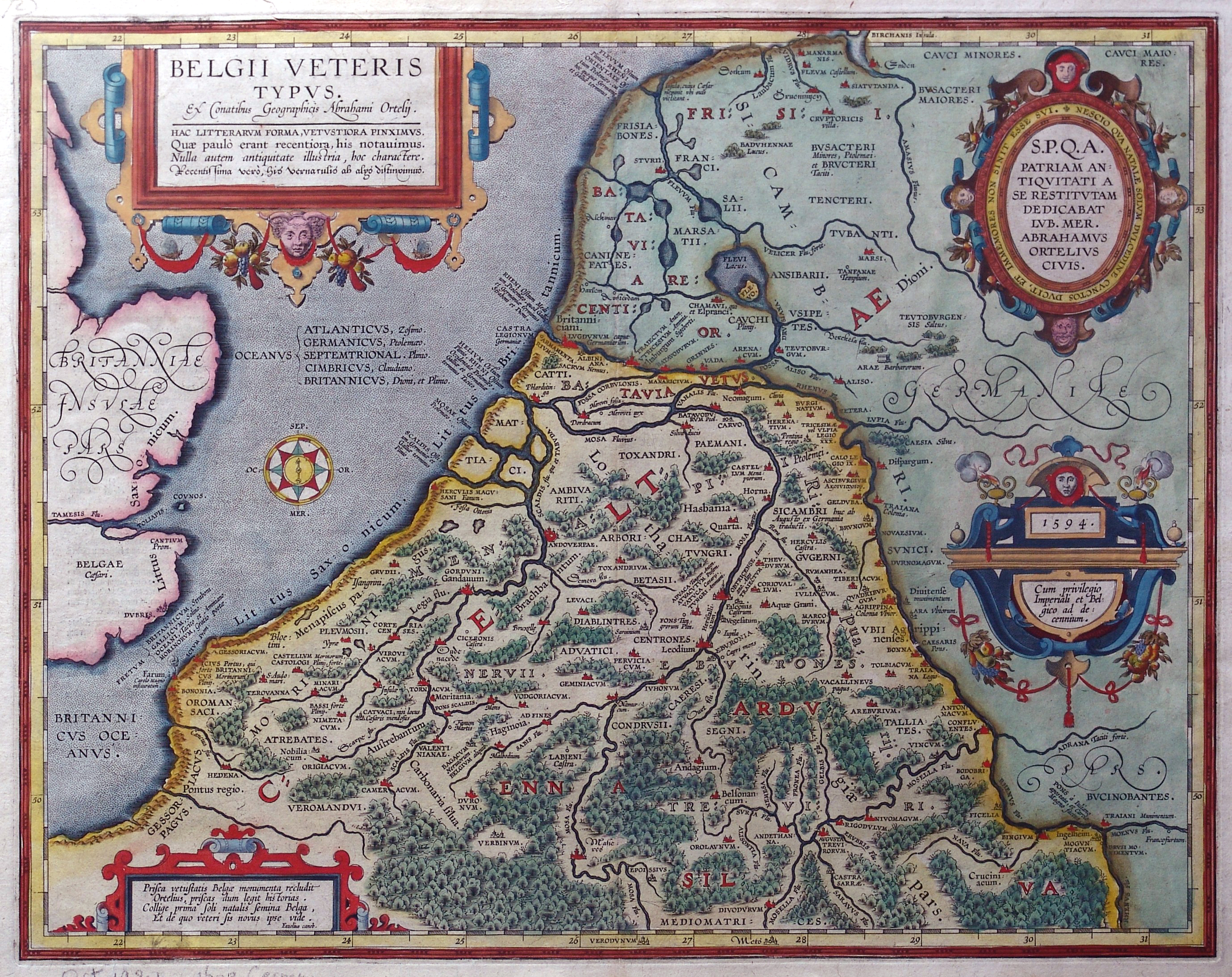
Map showing the Canal of Drusus from Arenacum

The Canals of Drusus (Latin: Fossae Drusianae) were Roman canals constructed for military purposes by Nero Claudius Drusus around 12 BC. It is believed to have linked the Rhine delta with the Lake Flevo (today's IJsselmeer). They facilitated troop transport to the north, avoiding the need to cross the open North Sea. This was of strategic importance for attacks on the Germanic people living on the Frisian coasts and along the Elbe estuary in the German Bight. Drusus' son Germanicus used the canals dug by his father's army in a military campaign some decades later. The canals are mentioned by Roman historians who lived two centuries later. One of them is Suetonius, who refers to them in his Vita Divi Claudi

The exact location of the canals is unknown, and it is a subject of debate among modern historians, archaeologists, and geologists. The canals might have been located inland along the valley of the river IJssel (not yet a distributary of the Rhine branch in Roman times). Alternatively, they might have been closer to the coast in the lagoon area north of Utrecht (one of many Roman border posts), connecting lagoon lakes with local branches of the Rhine delta.

Another possibility is the Lange Renne just over the border, in Germany. It connects two slings of the Rhine and has all the characteristics of a canal, including a 10-meter-deep hole in the canal bed where one of two dams was once removed, obviously created by the sudden influx of water, and a dam on the other side of the canal that is not entirely removed.

== See also ==
- List of Roman canals
