= Novaesium =

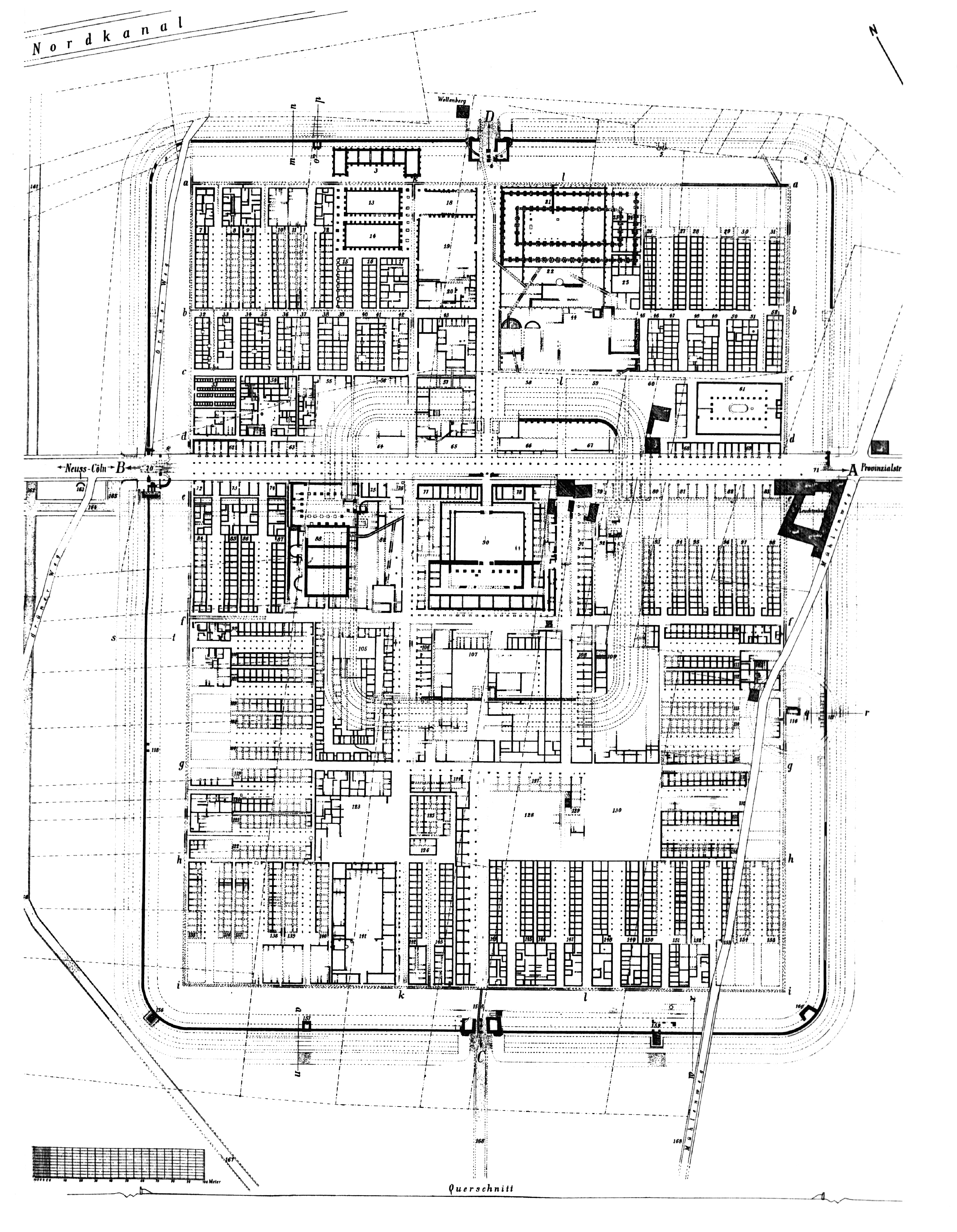
- Ground plan of the stone-built 'Koenenlager' Roman legionary fortress. The plan is from Koenen's excavations of 1887-1900.
- Interactive map of Novaesium
- 51.183889°N 6.721944°E
- Type: Multiple legionary camps and fortress
- Location: Gnadental, Neuss, North Rhine-Westphalia, Germany

History
- Founded: 16 BC or earlier
- Abandoned: 4th century CE

Site notes
- Excavation dates: 1887-1900, 1953-1980
- Archaeologists: Constantin Koenen (1854-1929), Gustav Müller (1921-1988), Michael Gechter (1946-2018)
- Discovered: 1886
- Condition: Entirely below ground, mostly now built over.
- Website: www.novaesium.de/ (in German)

Novaesium was the name the Romans used for the successive legionary camps and fortress at what is now the city of Neuss, on the west bank of the Rhine, in Germany. The earliest occupations, dating from the late 1st century BC to the early 1st century AD, were a succession of earth and timber camps with the legionaries living in tents. In around AD 43, a large legionary fortress was begun, which was progressively fortified with stone walls, gates, and turrets, along with more permanent barracks, officers' quarters and administrative buildings. As the Romans abandoned an expectation of a continually expanding empire the fortress became a permanent structure, and helped to create the Limes, limits of the Roman Empire, along this stretch of the Rhine Valley. The fortress was made smaller in the early 2nd century but remained an auxiliary base which helped define and defend the north-eastern limits of the Roman Empire for a further 200 years.

The foundations of the stone fortress were discovered by Constantin Koenen in the late 19th century. When excavated it was the first complete ground plan of a legionary fortress and came to epitomise the 'playing card' style Claudian era fortress. Further excavations in the 1950s to 1980s revealed progressively more complex precursor camps to the west of Koenen's excavations, leaving a chronology and terminology which remains to some extent unresolved. The whole site was developed for housing as the excavations progressed, limiting the scope for subsequent discovery or clarification. In 2021 the lower Rhine fortifications were inscribed as the Lower Germanic Limes UNESCO World Heritage Site, a series of 102 locations from south of Bonn (Germany) to the North Sea coast (the Netherlands).

== Historical writings and events ==
Novaesium is well attested within classical writings. Tacitus mentions the name in ten different passages of his Histories, describing troop movements, retreats, battles, defections and defeats during the turbulent year of 69 CE. Legio I Germanica had been stationed variously at Cologne, Novaesium and Bonn since 16 BC and had been caught up in the mutiny of 14 CE. Legio XVI Gallica were stationed in Novaesium from 43 to 70 CE. During 69 CE, the Year of the Four Emperors, in the turmoil following Nero's reign, parts of both legions had marched on Rome in support of Vitellius, and subsequently were both disbanded the following year after their inability to deal with the Revolt of the Batavi.

The Legio XX Valeria Victrix were at Novaesium until they joined Claudius's invasion of Britain in AD 43 and Legio VI Victrix was the legion brought into Novaesium to replace the two disbanded legions in 69/70 until they were relocated to Xanten sometime around the end of the first century when the legionary fortress was abandoned.

The Antonine Itinerary of around AD 200 gives a firmer basis for locating Novaesium at Neuss, and the map known as the Tabula Peutingeriana from around AD 300 meant its location was not in doubt. Ammianus Marcellinus's History written in 359, shows that as a settlement Novaesium retained its significance after the legions had left. The site of the fortress was re-used for a much smaller auxiliary fort, probably housing a cavalry unit (ala) for the next 200 years. The gravestone of a rider from the ala Afrorum veterana was found in Neuss and is dated around 100.

The 'Nivisium castellum' is also mentioned by Gregory of Tours. Around 575 he wrote Book II of his History of the Franks and section 9, quoting a now lost work by Sulpicius Alexander about events in 388, tells of how "Quintinus crossed the Rhine with his army near the stronghold of Neuss, and at his second camp from the river he found dwellings abandoned by their occupants and great villages deserted. For the Franks pretended to be afraid and retired into the more remote tracts, where they built an abattis on the edge of the woods." The Romans were subsequently trapped in the woods and marshes where "the ranks were thrown into disorder and the legions cut in pieces."

== Antiquarians and Archaeologists ==
=== Antiquarian activity up to the 1870s ===
A variety of Roman artifacts had been found in the town through the 17th and 18th centuries, including two gravestones belonging to the XX and XVI Legions and one placed by a veteran of an auxiliary unit. In 1839 the first Neuss antiquities association was formed by a Prussian medical officer, Dr. Hermann Joseph Jaeger. In 1844 they carried out excavations at Reckburg, discovering a small Roman fort, and in 1845 the Neuss Municipal Museum was begun, to display the growing quantity of finds.

=== Wide scale archaeology and the 'Koenenlager' ===
Fresh energy was injected in 1877 when a new generation of enthusiastic archaeologists founded the 'Vereins für Altertumskunde und Geschichte' (Association for Antiquities and History), whose members included Oskar Rautert and the 23 year old Constantin Koenen. After further work at the Reckburg excavations, attention was turned to the location of the legionary fortress, which had been assumed to be beneath the old town centre. Koenen pursued a theory that it was to the south of the town, and in 1886 got permission from the Bonn Provincial Museum to make a test excavation on open ground towards the area where the Rhine is joined by the river Erft. The findings were positive, and over the next 13 years, Koenen worked to reveal the whole of the ground plan of the legionary fortress. Although there had been no above-ground indications, it was found that the foundation levels were well-preserved. The scale of the excavations grew to a take in ever more of the fortress. To reveal the 25 hectares (62 acres) site the excavation team had to remove some 50,000 cubic meters/yards of overlying soil using shovels and wheelbarrows. This was part of a new archaeological movement across Europe, and for the first time, a full ground plan of a Legionary fortress was known. When the final results were published in 1904 it was something of a sensation. Koenen's excavations had revealed a 'playing card' shaped stone-walled rectangular fortress with rounded corners, turrets at intervals and substantial gates on each of the 4 sides. It was dated to the period from the mid-first century, when Emporer Claudius was consolidating the border along the Rhine Valley, and then moving the legions north-west to enable the expansion of Rome across the sea to Britain. The fortress ground plan identified 62 infantry barrack blocks around a central area with a colonaded administration block, Governor's residence, officers' houses, cavalry barracks, workshops, stores, a bath-house, infirmary and all that was needful for a legion of some 5,000 soldiers.

Whilst revealing the large legionary fortress, Koenen also became aware that a smaller, later fortress had been built within 'his' site, after the legions had departed. Limited additional excavations in the mid-1920s had also begun to find evidence of earlier camps to the west. Unravelling the complexities of these earlier and later structures would have to wait for new people, new methods and a time with less upheaval than the mid-20th century. In the meantime, the large stone fortress had become inextricably connected with Constantin Koenen, such that it is still often referred to as the 'Koenenlager' [Koenen's Camp].

Map of the Roman camps and fortress at Neuss

=== Müller and the post-war excavations ===
Through the 1950s there was significant urban expansion at Neuss and from 1955 this included works to develop the district of Gnadental, along with a road scheme, near the area of the fortress. In 1955 the Rhineland State Museum undertook further archaeological digs in advance of the construction works, funded initially by the city, and from 1957 by the Deutsche Forschungsgemeinschaft (German Research Foundation). The 1957 appointment of Gustav Müller to oversee these excavations provided a driving force for the excavations and analysis until 1972. By that point, a further 7 overlapping camps from pre-Claudian occupations (labelled Camps A to F, and dated from 16 BC to 43 AD) had been identified west of the Koenenlager and Koenen's camp itself was seen to have had a timber-and-earth phase followed by two different versions of stone construction on the same footprint. By dating the earliest of the temporary camps to 16 BC, it staked a claim to be amongst the earliest Roman military bases in the lower Rhine valley, and enabled the city of Neuss to celebrate 2000 years of existence in 1984.

==== Protected status and incomplete conclusions ====
By the late 20th century most of the area of the Roman camps and fortress had been built over with houses, limiting further excavation work to very occasional small areas as development occurred. More progress was made across modern Neuss where rescue and development archaeology was discovering civilian settlement evidence, although the tiny snapshots made it hard to build a clear picture of timings or extent. This left a lack of momentum in drawing together the vast quantity of finds and excavation records from previous generations. Müller had died in 1988, and although M. Gechter was commissioned to continue the task of producing a definitive summary, he died in 2012 with the material still unpublished. It had become increasingly clear that the pre-Claudian camps were more complex than the A-F designations implied, but as yet there is no published consensus on how to describe them. Further subdivisions of these camps have been proposed, and in 2012 an excavation in the area of these camps by Michael Kaiser discovered a 'pre-camp A' rampart dating to 30 BC, 16 years earlier than the supposed 'founding of Neuss'.

The area of the fortress is now a protected archaeological site, listed by the city of Neuss on the grounds of both its original significance to the Roman Empire and also for its place as the "Koenenlager", in the development of the military history of the Roman period. In 2021 the 'Frontiers of the Roman Empire – The Lower German Limes' was inscribed as a World Heritage Site (List 1631). The 44 sites in Germany and Netherlands, including Novaeseum, identify the range of military camps and associated civilian settlements from the Roman imperial period along this section of the limits of the Roman Empire.

Many of the finds from Novaesium are housed at the Clemens Sels Museum, Neuss. In 2022 the University of Bonn began a major 18-year research initiative on four of the legionary bases of the Lower Germanic Limes, namely Castra Bonnensis at Bonn, Novaesium at Neuss, Castra Vetera at Xanten and Ulpia Noviomagus Batavorum at Nijmegen.

== Tentative chronology of the different camps ==
As explained above, in 2024 there was not a definitive version of the chronology and terminology of the multiple occupation phases of the Roman settlement at Novaesium. Until such time as a more comprehensive review of the camps is published, this account is largely the terminology from the 1980s, which in most cases means interpreting excavations from the early 1960s.

=== Camps from the Augustan to Trajanic periods ===
The first 50 or more years of Roman military occupation at Novaesium are characterised by temporary encampments defended by earth banks and ditches, each in use for a short time, at the most a few years, to meet the needs of the moment for a legion or auxiliary unit. These all occupied areas fronting the Rhine alongside the Meertal marshes. Many of the camps overlap with earlier ones, but in varying sizes, shapes and locations. It is unknown how long each was occupied, and all dates here are uncertain. It cannot be ruled out that several camps were in use at the same time

- 30 BC: The earliest ramparts appear to be of Roman construction, but of unknown extent.
- Camp A: 20-15 until 10 BC. Trapezoidal earthwork enclosing around 15 hectares (37 acres) for an auxiliary or vexillatio unit. Excavated tent pegs indicate a tented encampment.
- Camp B: 12-10 BC until AD 9. 45 hectares (110 acres) trapezoidal camp with earth and timber ramparts, aligned to face the then course of the Rhine. (It has since shifted northwards beyond the mouth of the Erft). The units stationed at this time are unknown but were possibly Legio XIX and potentially another legion as well. The end of this occupation may be linked to the Roman defeat at the Battle of the Teutoburg Forest.
- Camp C: In use by AD 14, when Augustus died. Soldiers here initiated a mutiny that summer and made an attempt to place Germanicus on the throne. This may have been the largest of the camps, although most boundary ramparts were not discovered. A large east gatehouse was excavated, with two passageways each of 3 metres (9.8 ft) wide, separated by a substantial central pillar. The Forum and Praetorium were excavated, under what is now the B1 Autobahn. The whole enclosed camp (occupying almost all of the areas previously and subsequently used up to Camp F) could have extended to 80 hectares (200 acres).
- Camp D: AD 14 or later. This was a much smaller camp, of only around 3 hectares (7.4 acres), near the Rhine, and would have housed maybe 500 or 1000 soldiers or 500 Cavalry.
- Camp E: up until AD 17. The last of the large camps, at some 40 hectares (99 acres), this had a 5 metres (16 ft) wide 'V' shaped ditch, backed by an earth and timber wall, but would have been used for a very short time. In AD 17 Tiberius abandoned the policy of continual conquest that had been a feature of Roman rule up to that point. The repeated failures to establish Roman rule east of the Rhine meant the establishment of a linear defensive line and the beginnings of permanent garrisons instead of temporary camps.
- Camp F: AD 35 up until AD 43. Significantly smaller than Camp E, this was rebuilt several times, with sizes ranging from 22 to 26 ha (54 to 64 acres). There are now thought to be 5 or 6 camp periods within the 'Camp F' umbrella, largely on the same footprint but with a number of rebuildings, and given the sub-codes F1a-c, F2a-b, F3. Whether the site was unused for 18 years is not certain, but around AD 35, when the double-legionary fortress at Cologne was dissolved, the Legio XX Valeria Victrix moved north to take up residence at Novaesium, beginning an 80 year period in which it was not just a camp but a permanent Legionary presence. Auxiliary units were also present, and all were occupying largely the same ramparted sites as previously. When, in AD 43, Emporer Claudius began his invasion of Britain the Legio XX were sent to join that campaign. Their camp was levelled and ceased to be used by Roman troops. The replacement troops of Legio XVI Gallica, coming north from Mainz, chose instead to occupy an entirely new site, immediately to the east of the old camps.

=== Camp G: The Claudian fortress ===
The ground plan of the new legionary fortress laid out by the incoming troops in AD 43 formed what would now be considered a classic Roman Castrum plan. The 'playing card' shape of a rectangular walled fortress with rounded corners had a substantial gate on each of the four sides. The main internal roads were the via praetoria/decumana (along the camp's long axis) and the via principalis (which is now the route of modern-day Kölner Straße). These led to the four gates and created the main subdivisions within the fortress. This ground plan remained fixed during the time the Legions were resident. However, the fortress received multiple thorough rebuilding periods during that time.

Camp G1, the initial construction of AD 43 was a timber and earth structure. Because later rebuilds were on the same lines, only fragments now remain to indicate what this was like, but it would have been planked double walls filled with earth, large timber two-storey gatehouses, corner towers and perhaps as many as 60 intermediate towers spaced along the walls, which were 570 by 420 metres (1,870 by 1380 feet) along each side. The internal area was thus 25 hectares (62 acres), of which 62 barrack blocks occupied the most space, and each housed a 'century' of some 80 soldiers, plus their centurion. The barracks formed a defensive ring around the central administration blocks, warehouses, workshops, baths and officers' quarters.

The transition to 'Camp G2', which was in essence the gradual replacement of timber structures with stonework, was underway by the middle of the first century. A double ditch was added around the outside of the walls, and additional ramps and walls were built on the side facing the Rhine. Stone two-storey gatehouses and new administration buildings were also added. During the Revolt of the Batavi of AD 69/70 the fortress was in some measure destroyed. With the Legio XVI Gallica also disbanded in disgrace, a new legion arrived, Legio VI Victrix, to rebuild the fortress, this time with stone walls some 4 metres (13 ft) high. The Principia (main administration building) was enlarged to 88 by 81 metres and various central buildings were extended. Further rebuilding work appears to have happened 10 years later, both of the defensive walls and interior buildings. This final phase of the Legionary fortress was the one that was most in evidence during Koenen's excavations of the late 19th century and is the layout that was recreated in a 1:200 scale model of the fortress, made between 1989 and 2006, which is now on display in Neuss at the training center of the State Office of Police NRW (LAFP)

=== Camp H: The Auxiliary/Cavalry base ===
By around AD 104 (and possibly as early as AD 95) the Legio VI Vitrix had departed from Novaesium. There is no historical account of this event, and the archaeology has not been definitive on the date. By AD 104 the central area of the old Legionary fortress was being remodelled as a smaller auxiliary camp traditionally indicated as Camp H. There are indications it may have been a base for a cavalry unit (as happened at Xanten and Bonn), and a gravestone of a rider from ala Afrorum veterana, dated around 100, gives a possible candidate for the Ala (Roman cavalry unit). Camp H was 178 m long and 165 m wide, which covered an area of some 3 hectares (7.4 acres), bounded by a 1.8 metres (5.9 ft) wide wall and ditches up to 21 metres (69 ft) wide. Few traces of the interior layout survived, and it is unknown if it was continuously or sporadically occupied. However, it had occupation over at least up to AD 256, when an invasion of Franks caused major destruction, and may have been completely destroyed in 275 during incursions following the downfall of the Gallic Empire. However, there are 4th century finds relating to Camp H, suggesting it remained in use in some form for another 50 or more years.

As mentioned above, the writings of Ammianus Marcellinus and Gregory of Tours both indicate that Novaesium or its successor settlement were still occupied and active through the 4th and even 5th centuries, but what this might indicate in terms of locations, military and civilian activity and overall significance remains uncertain.

== Civilian settlement ==
The history and continuity of the various categories of civilian settlement in the area is as uncertain as that of the military. There would undoubtedly have been a Canabae Legionis while the Legions were present. Whilst civilian in nature, this was nevertheless under the legal protection and regulation of the camp. It would have been a diverse group of relatives, traders, retired legionaries, and all sorts of service providers, perhaps even including theatres, baths and temples. Homes and businesses strung themselves along the roads leading up to the camp but many might expect to follow the legion when it moves on, and may leave little by way of archaeological remains.

Unlike the Canabae, the Vicus (unplanned civilian town in the vicinity of the Camp) that grew up near Novaesium was not under military control and might be expected to have become a more permanent feature of the landscape. Lots of individual finds and sites have been excavated around the centre of modern-day Neuss, suggesting it was the precursor to the later town, but it has not yet been possible to build a coherent picture of the scale and nature of the settlement, or its continuity into later periods.
