= Burgus =

Fortification of late Roman imperial times

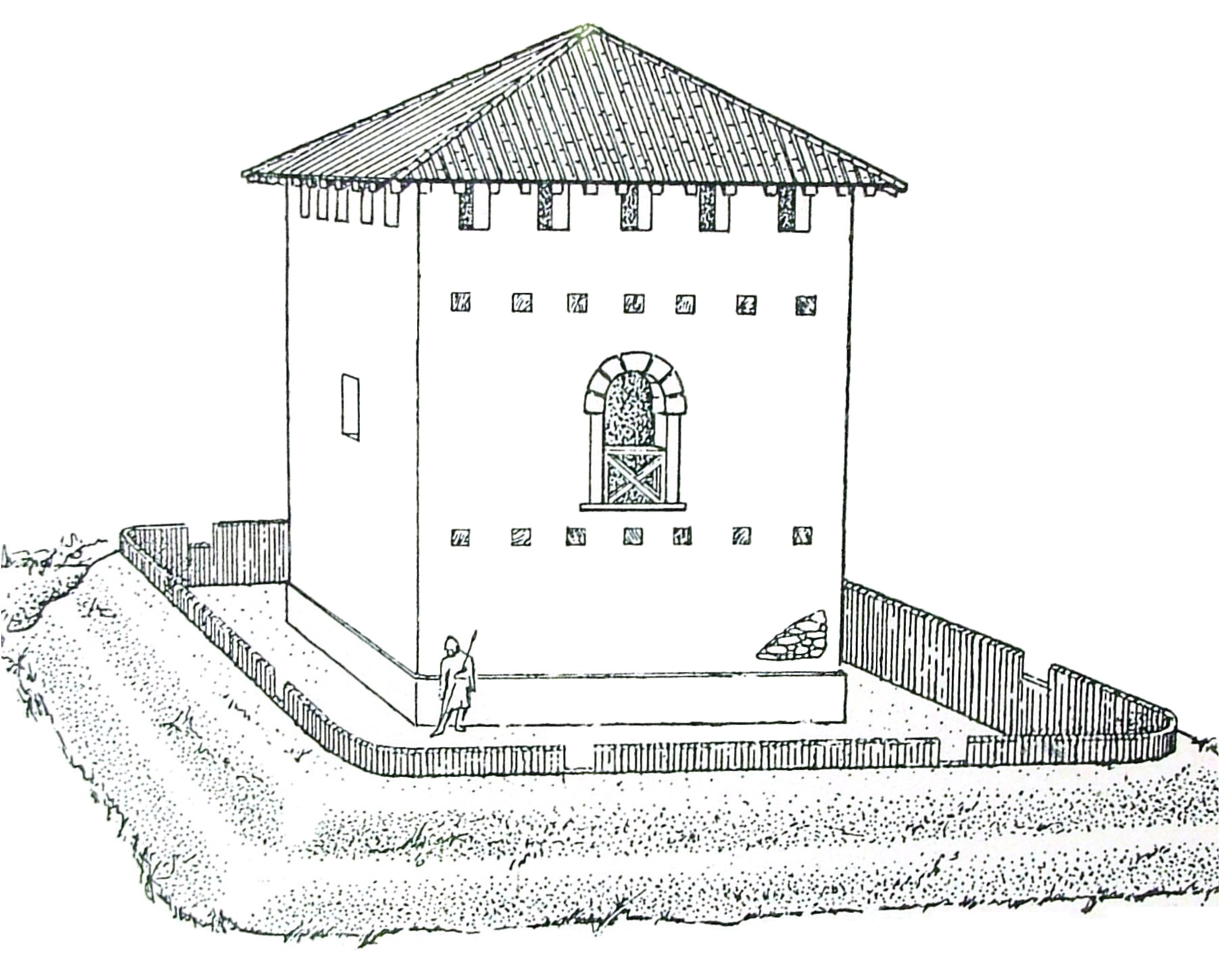
The Ahegg burgus

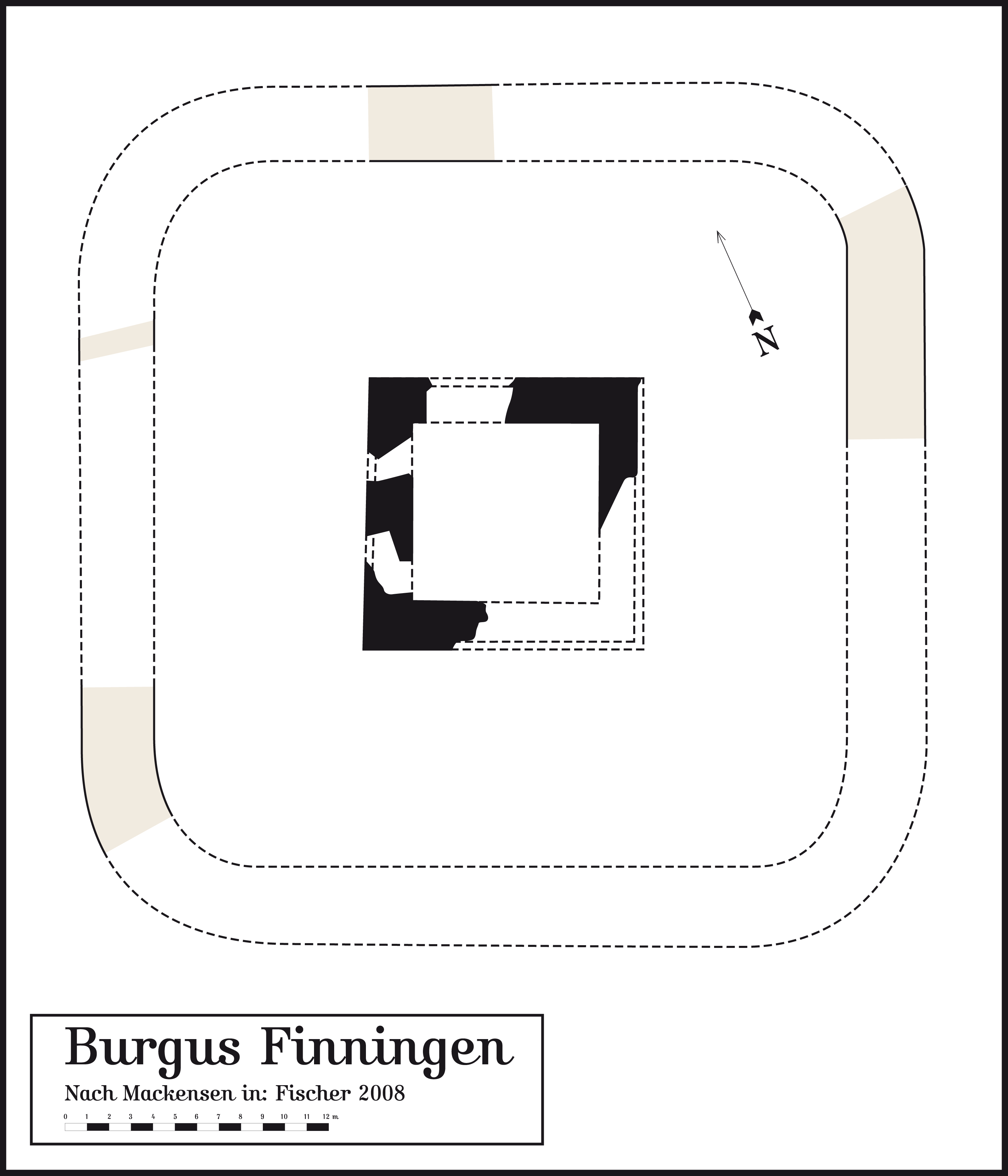
The Finningen burgus based on research by Michael Mackensen, 1985

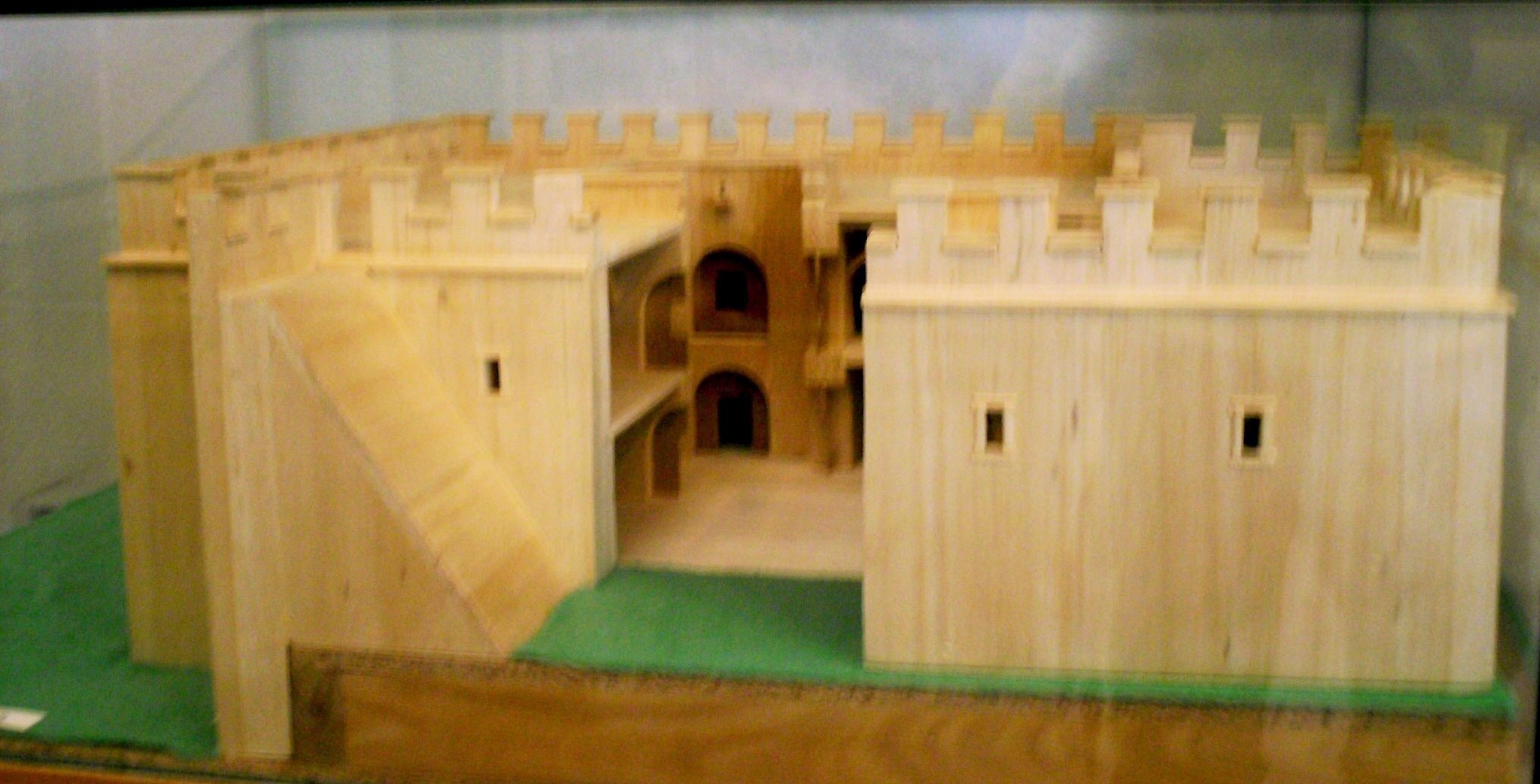
Model (sectioned) of the burgus or ruined fort of Zeiselmauer. View from the south (Roman Museum, Tulln (Austria))

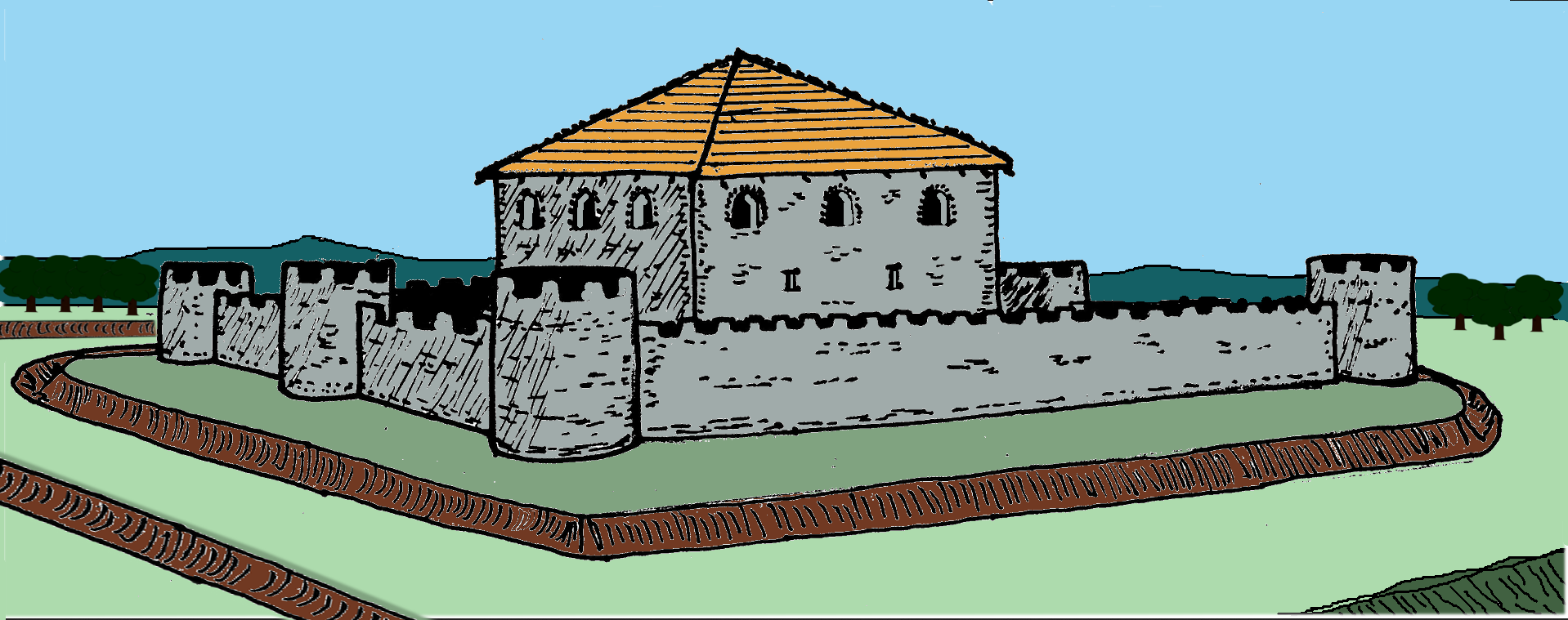
Artist's impression of the late Roman Asperden burgus, core site with outer walls and ditch

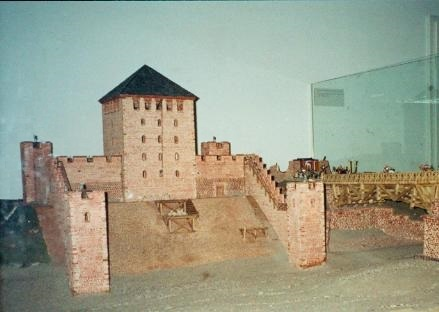
Artist's impression of the Ländeburgus at Ladenburg. The bridge has not been established archaeologically.

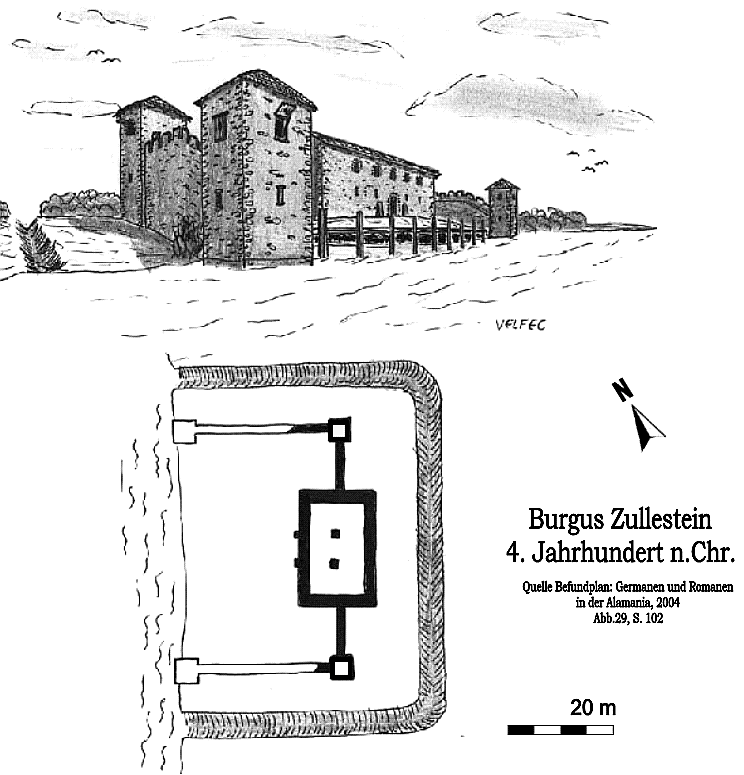
Artist's impression of the Ländeburgus at Zullestein (D) with site plan

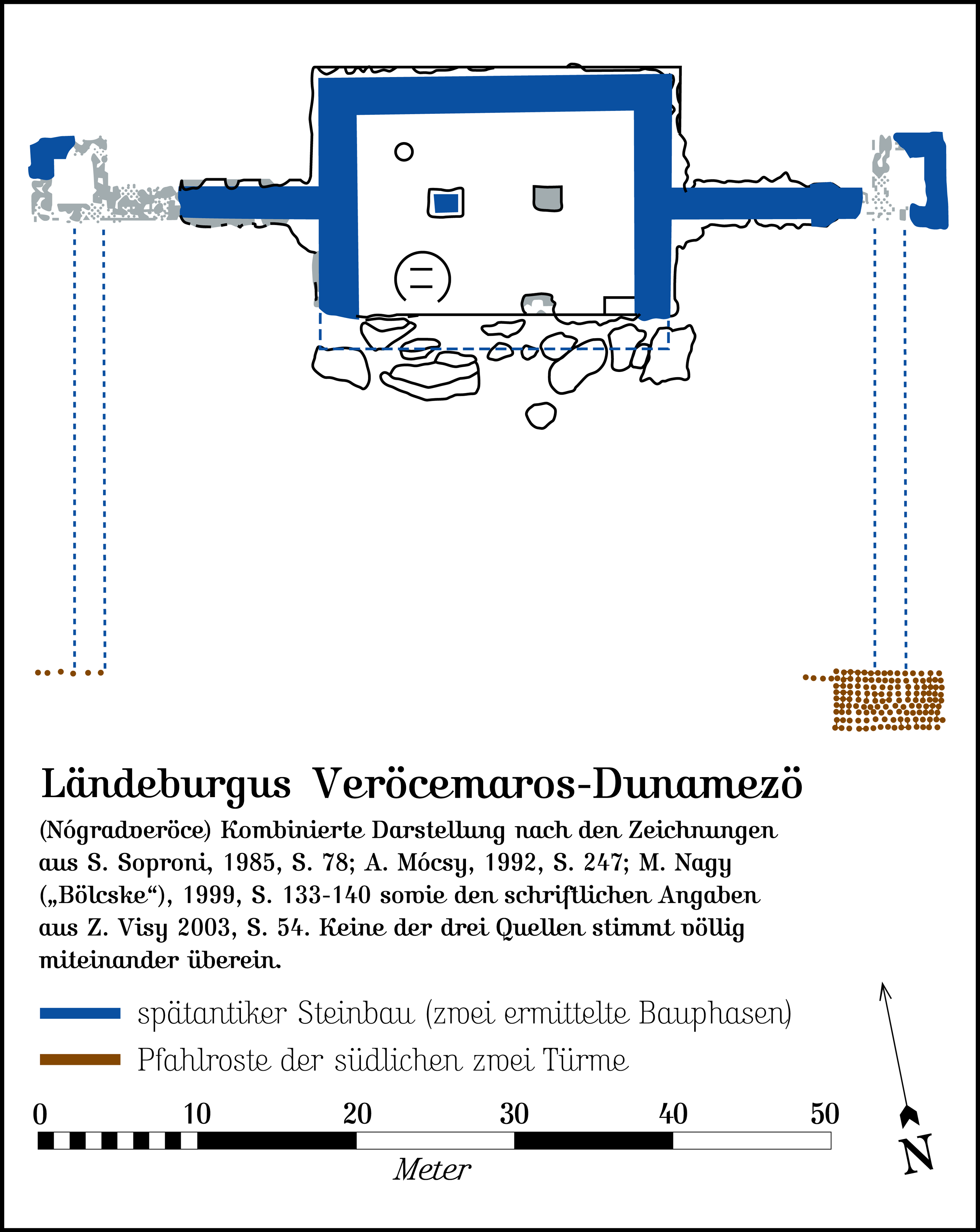
Floor plan of the well-researched burgus of Veröcemaros-Dunamezö

A burgus (Latin, plural burgi ) or turris ("tower") is a small tower-like castrum of late antiquity, which was sometimes protected by an outwork and surrounding ditches. Timothy Darvill defines it as "a small fortified position or watchtower usually controlling a main routeway."

Burgus was a term used in the later period of the Roman Empire, and particularly in the Germanic provinces.

== Definition ==
Burgus is a Latin word, used from the end of the second century but more common in late antiquity, and derived from the Germanic languages; it is cognate with the Greek pyrgos. It refers to a fortified tower, sometimes designed for observation.

== Development and function ==
From 369 AD, under Valentinian, an extensive fortress building programme was set under way on the borders of the Empire. This entailed the construction of two-storey, rectangular towers (on average 8–12 m wide and 10–12 m high), so-called residual forts (German: Restkastelle) in limes camps that had already been largely denuded of their complements, and granaries (horrea) envisaged for border troops. These burgi were essentially a development of the limes towers of the middle imperial period and consisted, in the case of the larger examples, of a tower-like central structure and outer fortifications (a rampart, defensive wall or palisade, surrounded by several ditches). A conspicuous feature of buildings of this type of the Late Antiquity is the significant increase in size of the central tower. Most of these new fortifications were abandoned or destroyed by about the middle of the 5th century.

Burgi were erected along border rivers and along major roads, where they are likely to have been used for observation, as forward positions or for signalling. Buildings such as smaller watchtowers, fortlets (castella), civilian refuges at estates and fortified docks for riverboats, especially on the Upper Rhine and Danube, were also called burgi. In the coastal cities of the Roman Empire and early Byzantium, local defensive complexes (burgi) were also built to protect important harbours.

Troops at these posts carried out policing duties on the roads and looked after the maintenance of law and order in the villages. Burgi might control movement on roads or rivers, or serve in emergencies as a places of retreat. Larger towers, such as one at Asperden, probably served as refuges for the surrounding population and as granaries.

A special type of burgus contained a river landing. In addition to a rectangular building near the river bank, these had crenellated walls that extended up to or into the river like pincers, thus protecting a landing stage or berthing bay for cargo ships and river patrol boats.

== See also ==
- Castrum/castra
- Castellum
- Burh

== Sources ==
- Thomas Fischer: Die Römer in Deutschland. Theiss, Stuttgart, 1999, ISBN 3-8062-1325-9.
- Jörg Fesser: Frühmittelalterliche Siedlungen der nördlichen Vorderpfalz. Dissertation University of Mannheim, 2006.
- Dieter Planck, Andreas Thiel: Das Limes-Lexikon, Roms Grenzen von A-Z. Beck, Munich, 2009, ISBN 978-3-406-56816-9, p. 21.
- Yann Le Bohec: Die römische Armee. Steiner, Stuttgart, 1993, ISBN 3-515-06300-5, pp. 175–177.
- Ute Naberfeld: Rekonstruktionsversuch des spätrömischen Burgus von Asperden. In: An Niers und Kendel. 11 (1984), pp. 16–17.
- Baden State Museum (publ.): Imperium Romanum, Römer, Christen, Alamannen-Die Spätantike am Oberrhein. Theiss, Stuttgart, 2005, ISBN 3-8062-1954-0.
- Вус О. В., Сорочан С. Б. Ранневизантийские бурги на побережье Таврики и Европейского Боспора (к вопросу о военном присутствии римлян в Юго-Восточном Крыму в IV—VI вв.) // Византийская мозаика: Сборник публичных лекций Эллино-византийского лектория при Свято-Пантелеимоновском храм. — Вып. 9. — Харьков: Майдан, 2021. — С. 162—198. — (Нартекс. Byzantina Ukraniensia. Supplementum 9). — ISBN 978-966-372-833-9.
