= Fossa Corbulonis =

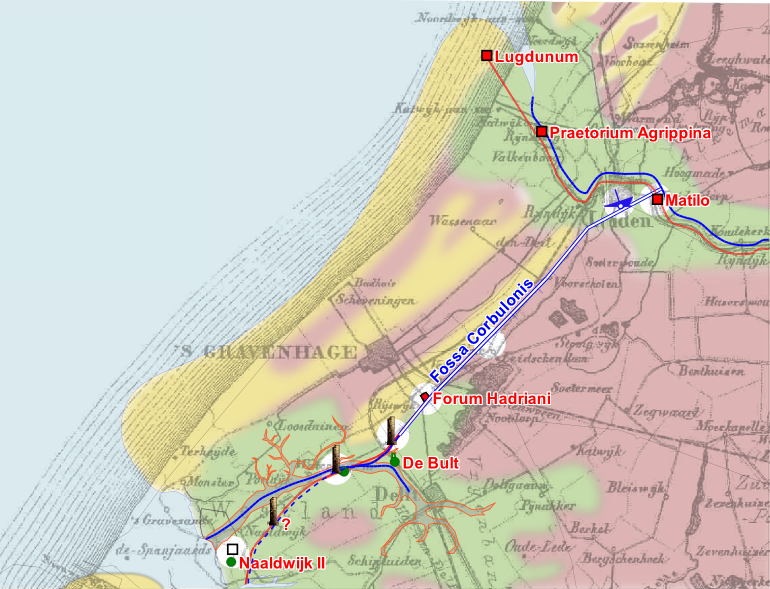
Map of the probable route of the Fossa Corbulonis. Paleogeography of 50 AD (green: tidal marsh, brown: peat, yellow: ancient beach ridge).

The Fossa Corbulonis (Dutch: Kanaal van Corbulo) was a Roman canal that was dug around 50 AD under the direction of Gnaeus Domitius Corbulo. The project was mentioned by the historians Tacitus and Cassius Dio, who reported its length as 23 Roman miles and accounted for its purpose as "in order to keep the soldiers busy and to avoid the dangers of the Ocean".

The canal connected the mouths of the rivers Meuse and Rhine in the currently Dutch delta area. Parts of the canal remained in use up to about 275 AD when the area became depopulated due to Frankish attacks.

== See also ==
- List of Roman canals
