= Germania Inferior =

Roman province in Western Europe (83 AD – 475 AD)

Germania Inferior Lower Germania
- Province of the Roman Empire
- 83–475
- The province of Germania Inferior within the Roman Empire, c. 117
- Capital: Colonia Claudia Ara Agrippinensium (CCAA)
- Historical era: Antiquity
  - Established after the Gallic Wars: 83
  - Gallic Empire: 260–274
  - Francia: 475
| Succeeded by |
| Frankish Empire |
- Today part of: Netherlands; Belgium; Germany; Luxembourg

Germania Inferior ("Lower Germania") was a Roman province on the west bank of the Rhine bordering the North Sea from around AD 85 until the province was renamed Germania Secunda in the 4th century AD. The capital of the province was Colonia Claudia Ara Agrippinensium, modern-day Cologne.

== Geography ==
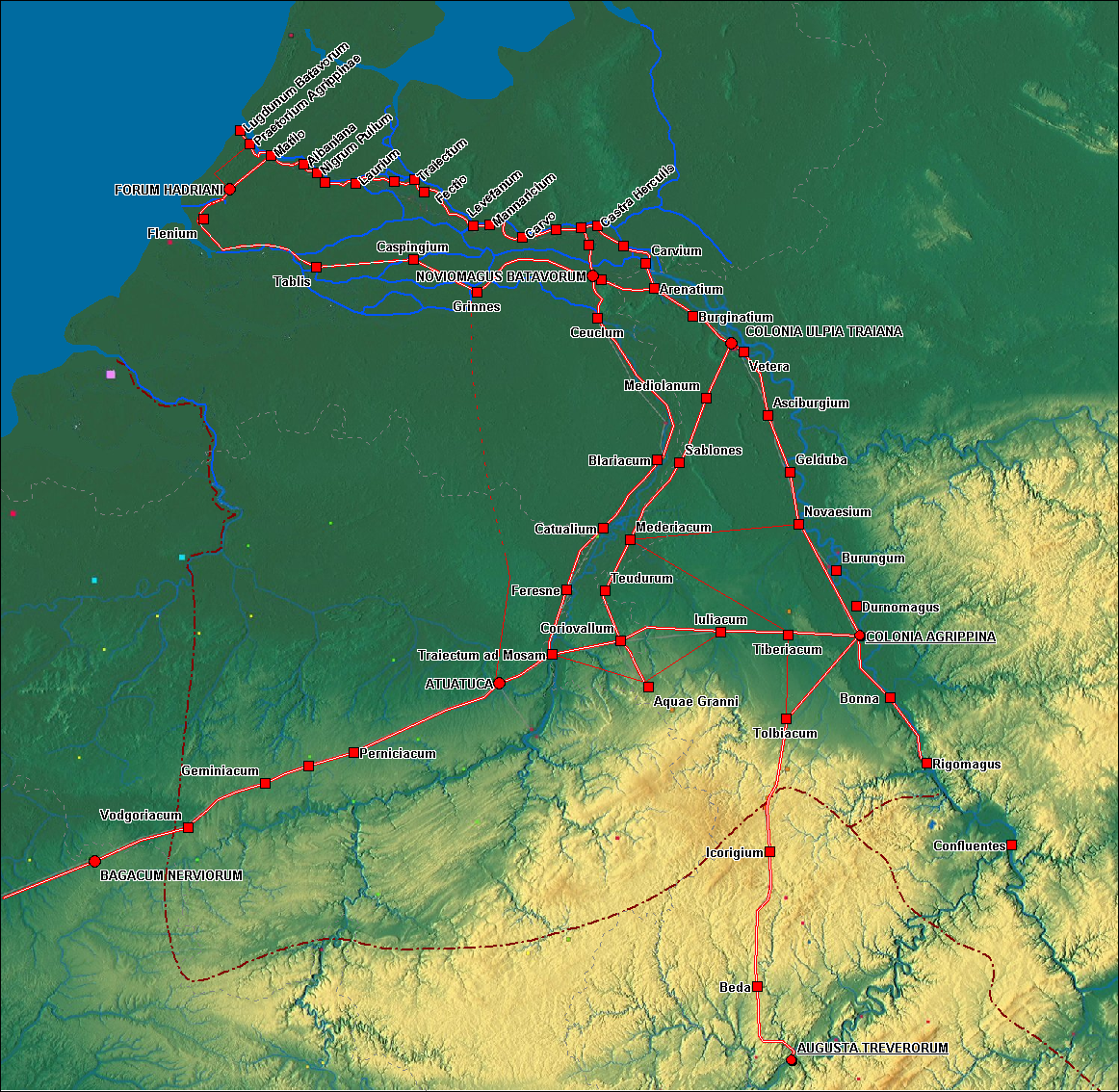
Borders of the Germania Inferior, with main roads and cities/forts

According to Ptolemy (2.9), Germania Inferior included the Rhine from its mouth up to the mouth of the Obringa, a river identified with either the Aar or the Moselle. The territory included modern-day Luxembourg, the southern Netherlands, part of Belgium, and part of North Rhine-Westphalia in Germany, west of the Rhine.

The principal settlements of the province were Castra Vetera, Colonia Ulpia Traiana (both near Xanten), Coriovallum (Heerlen), Albaniana (Alphen aan den Rijn), Lugdunum Batavorum (Katwijk), Forum Hadriani (Voorburg), Ulpia Noviomagus Batavorum (Nijmegen), Traiectum (Utrecht), Atuatuca Tungrorum (Tongeren), Bona (Bonn), and Colonia Agrippinensis (Cologne), the provincial capital.

== History ==
The Roman Empire in the time of Hadrian (ruled 117–138), showing, on the lower Rhine river, the imperial province of Germania Inferior (NW Germany/S. Netherlands, E. Belgium), and the three legions deployed there in 125. Note that the coast lines shown in the map are those of today, known to be different from those in Roman times in the North Sea area.

Roman settlement in what would become Germania Inferior began around 50 BC, these settlements being incorporated in the province Gallia Belgica. The first confrontations between the Roman army and the peoples of Germania Inferior occurred during Julius Caesar's Gallic Wars. Caesar invaded the region in 57 BC and in the next three years annihilated several tribes, including the Eburones and the Menapii, which were most likely Celtic or mixed Celtic-Germanic tribes, though called Germanic by Caesar. Germanic influence (mainly through the Tungri) increased during Roman times, leading to the assimilation of the Celtic peoples in the area.

Despite largely being occupied by Roman forces since the reign of Augustus, Germania Inferior was not integrated as a province until the reign of Domitian (r. 81-96 AD), ca. 85 AD. The province was split from Gallia Belgica following campaigns against the Chatti from 83-85 AD. This expansion led to the creation of two new imperial provinces, Germania Superior and Germania Inferior (Upper & Lower Germany respectively), known together as Germani Cisrhenani. The capitol of Germania Inferior was located at the city of Colonia Claudia Ara Agrippinensium, modern-day Cologne. The adjective Inferior refers to its position downstream of the Rhine relative to Germania Superior.

The army of Germania Inferior, typically shown on inscriptions as EX.GER.INF. (Exercitus Germaniae Inferioris), included several legions at various times: of these, Legions I Minervia and XXX Ulpia Victrix were the most permanent. The Roman Navy's Classis Germanica (Germanic fleet), charged with patrolling the Rhine and the North Sea coast, were based at Castra Vetera and later at Colonia Claudia Ara Agrippinensis.

As attested in the early 5th century document Notitia Dignitatum, the province was renamed Germania Secunda (Germania II) in the 4th century. It was administered by a consularis and formed part of the Diocese of Gaul. Up to the end of Roman control, it was an intensely garrisoned province that was inhabited by Romans and Ripuarian Franks in the 5th century. Its capital remained at Colonia Claudia Ara Agrippinensium, which also became the seat of a Christian bishopric, which was in charge of an ecclesiastical province that survived the fall of the Western Roman Empire.

After the final abandonment of the province it became the core of the Frankish Kingdom.

== See also ==
- List of Roman governors of Germania Inferior
- Revolt of the Batavi, a major uprising against Roman rule
- Germanicus, the role of Germania Inferior in Roman politics
- Roman Britain's continental trade
- Germania
- Vetera

== Bibliography ==
- Bechert, Tilmann (2007). Germania inferior. Eine Provinz an der Nordgrenze des Römischen Reiches [Germania inferior. A province on the northern frontier of the Roman Empire]. Mainz: Zabern, ISBN 978-3-8053-2400-7.
- Lendering, Jona (2000). De randen van de aarde: de Romeinen tussen Schelde en Eems. Amsterdam. ISBN 90-263-1630-5.
