= Legio XXX Ulpia Victrix =

Roman legion

Map of the Roman Empire in AD 125, under emperor Hadrian, showing the Legio XXX Ulpia Victrix, stationed on the river Rhine at Castra Vetera (Xanten, Germany), in Germania Inferior province, from AD 122 until the 5th century

Legio XXX Ulpia Victrix ("Trajan's Victorious Thirtieth Legion") was a legion of the Imperial Roman army. Their emblems were the gods Neptune and Jupiter and the Capricorn. Ulpia is Trajan's own gens, while the cognomen "Victrix" means "victorious," and it was awarded after their valiant behaviour in the Dacian Wars. The legion was active until the disbandment of the Rhine frontier in the beginning of the 5th century.

== History ==
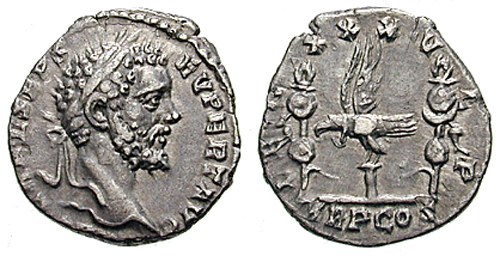
XXX Ulpia Victrix supported Pannonian army commander, Septimius Severus, in his bid for purple. This denarius was struck in 193 to celebrate the legion.

It was founded in AD 100 by the emperor Trajan for service in the Dacian Wars.

The legion's first base camp was in the province of Dacia in the Danube frontier. It is likely that at least some of its legionaries took part in the Parthian campaigns of Trajan. In 122 they were moved to Colonia Ulpia Traiana (modern Xanten) in Germania Inferior, where they remained for the following centuries. Their main tasks were public construction and police affairs.

In the 2nd century and the beginning of the 3rd century, units of the XXX Ulpia Victrix were allocated in Parthia, as well as Gaul, Mauretania and other Roman provinces, due to the peaceful situation in Germania Inferior. They fought in Antoninus Pious' campaigns in Mauritania.

In the civil war of 193, XXX Ulpia Victrix supported Septimius Severus, who granted them the title of Pia Fidelis ("faithful and loyal").

The legion was used by Emperor Alexander Severus in his 235 campaign against the Sassanids. Later the legion would be involved in Alexander Severus' campaign on the Rhine Frontier. It was almost certainly involved in Gallienus's wars against the Franks in the 250s. L. Petronius Taurus Volusianus was Primus Pilus of the legion at this time. It supported the Gallic Empire of Postumus (260–274) and suffered great losses when Aurelian overthrew Tetricus I in a bloody battle at the Catalaunian Fields in 274.

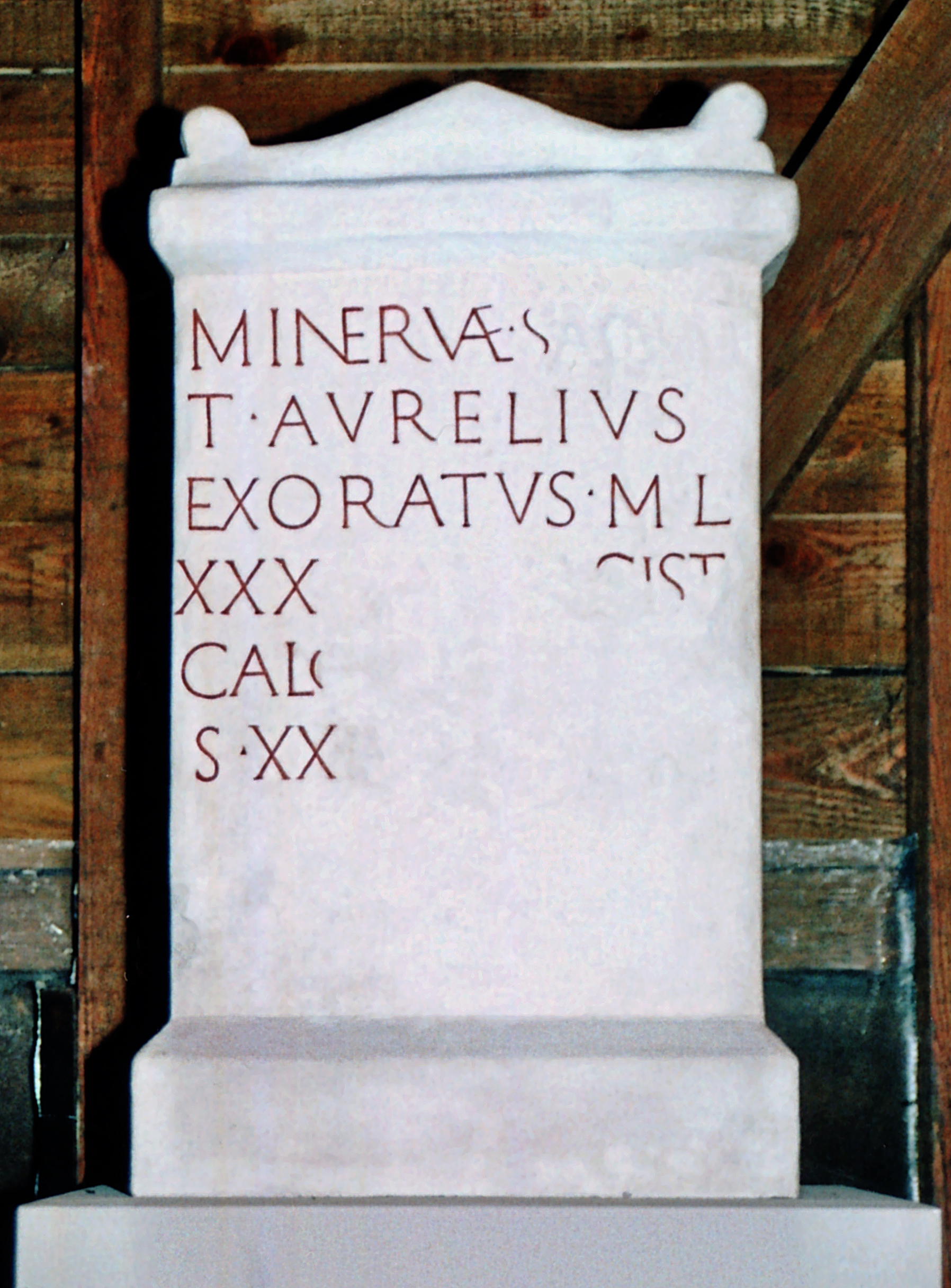
In Iversheim, part of the town of Bad Münstereifel, North Rhine-Westphalia, the 30th Legion had large lime kilns. This stone was consecrated by the soldier Titus Aurelius Exoratus, master of the lime kilns.

With the re-organization of the Roman Army (Constantius I Chlorus), the legions guarding the border lost their importance to the comitatus, the main, cavalry-based army behind the limes. The collapse of the Rhine frontier after 408–410 marked the end of the legion's history.

== Attested members ==
Name	Rank	Time frame	Province	Source
Lucius Aemilius Carus	legatus	c. 135	Germania Inferior	CIL VI, 1333
Gnaeus Julius Verus	legatus	c. 144-c. 147	Germania Inferior	CIL III, 2732
Gaius Julius Severus	legatus	c. 147-c. 150	Germania Inferior	CIG 4029 = ILS 8829
[...] Egr[ilius Plarianus]	legatus	161/169 or 177/180	Germania Inferior	AE 1969/70, 82
Lucius Saevinius Proculus	legatus	c. 170-c. 172	Germania Inferior	AE 1969/70, 601
Quintus Marcius Gallianus	legatus	c. 220	Germania Inferior	CIL XIII, 8810
Cannutius Modestus	legatus	c. 223	Germania Inferior	CIL XIII, 8607
Quintus Petronius Melior	legatus	3rd century	Germania Inferior	CIL XI, 3367
Gaius Junius Faustinus	legatus	3rd century	Germania Inferior	
Gaius Julius Septimius Castinus	Dux	3rd century	Germania Inferior	
Gaius Cattanius Tertius	legionary	3rd Century	Germania Inferior	
Titus Caesonnius Quinctianus	military tribune	c. 125	Germania Inferior	CIL V, 865
Petronus Fortunatus	legionary	2nd Century	Germania Inferior	
Lucius Petronius Taurus Volusianus	primus pilus	c. 253	Germania Inferior	CIL XI, 1836
"Valentinus"	unknown	c. 175	Germania Inferior/Britannia	Colchester Vase

== See also ==
- List of Roman legions
