= Vetera =

Roman fort, cultural heritage and archaeological site in Germany

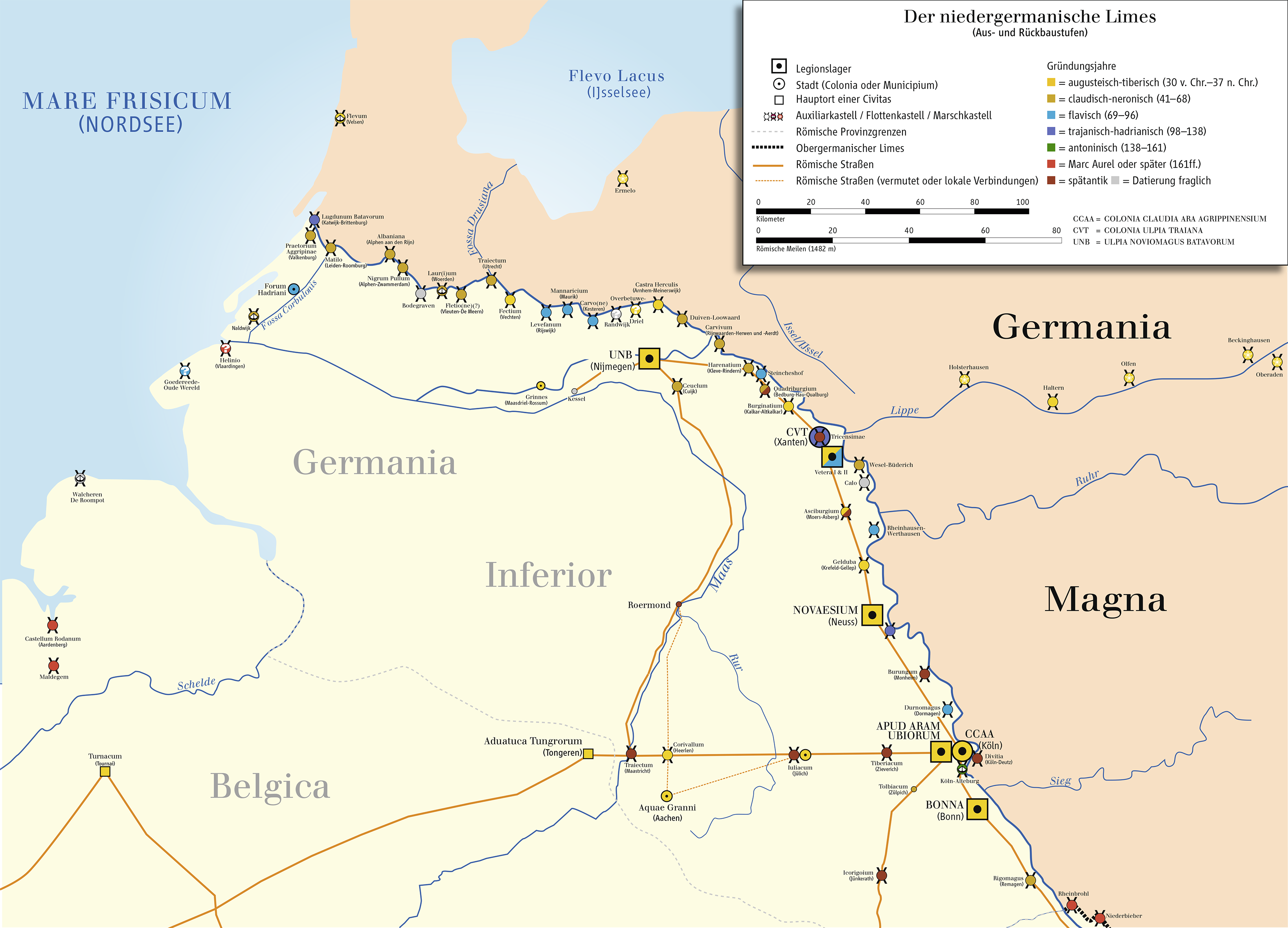
Location of the legionary camps of Vetera and Colonia Ulpia Traiana along the course of the Lower Germanic Limes

Vetera (also Vetera Castra; sometimes in older literature, on maps, and colloquially also Castra Vetera) was the name of the location of two successive Roman legionary camps in the province of Germania Inferior near present-day Xanten on the Lower Rhine. The legionary camps of Vetera were part of the Lower Germanic Limes and were declared a UNESCO World Heritage Site in 2021.

Research and scholarly literature distinguish between the older fort site Vetera I (13/12 BCE to 70 CE) and the younger fort site Vetera II (71 to at least the 3rd century). These sites were located approximately one Roman mile (mille passus = just under 1500 m) apart. Vetera was one of the most significant garrisons on the northern flank of the Roman Empire. In its early days, it was an essential deployment base for the Romans' expansion efforts on the right bank of the Rhine. Vetera I is currently situated on undeveloped land in the urban area of Xanten, while Vetera II is located up to ten metres below the surface of a quarry pond.

== Geographical position ==
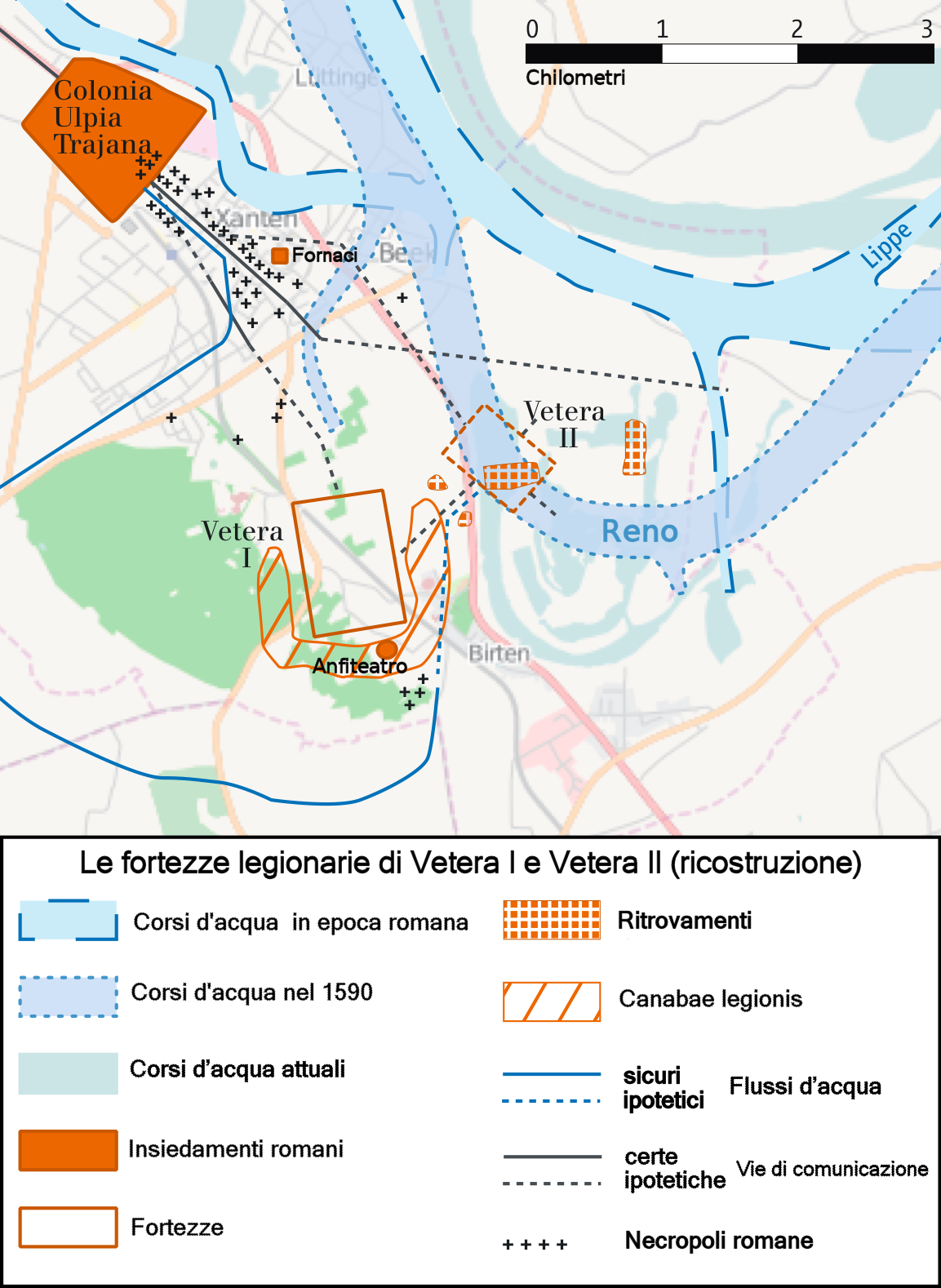
Location of the legionary camps Vetera I and II and Colonia Ulpia Traiana

Vetera I was located on the southern slope of the Fürstenberg, a glacial terminal moraine surrounded by swamp and moorland in ancient times, a good two kilometres south-southeast of the centre of Xanten. The present-day archaeological monument is located directly north-northwest of the Xanten suburb of Birten, beneath largely agricultural land. In ancient times, the camp was located in an exposed position opposite the mouth of the river Lippe, which at that time was not yet in Wesel, but a little to the north.

In Roman times, the course of the Rhine itself was roughly the same as it is today, having shifted only slightly to the south and west. From its position on the Fürstenberg, it was therefore possible to keep a close eye on the valleys of the Rhine and the Lippe (Lupia).

Vetera II was built in 71 CE, following the reorganisation of the Lower Germanic army as a result of the events of 69/70, about a kilometre and a half east of Vetera I, on a low terrace of the Rhine that was not flooded at the time. In today's topography, the site lies in the area known as the Bislicher Insel, surrounded by the Rhine to the north and an old branch of the Rhine to the east, south and west. In ancient times, it was probably situated directly on the Rhine as it flowed northwards. The partially silted branch of the Rhine visible today, which forms a loop far to the south, was not formed until the Middle Ages, around 1200. Over the following centuries, this loop of the Rhine moved further south, undermining the fort site and covering it with gravel. It was in 1788/89 when the Rhine was artificially diverted and forced to take its present course, that the loop became a dead old branch of the Rhine.

== Antiquity sources and name of the fort site ==
The name Vetera is first mentioned by Tacitus in the Historiae, where it is referred to twice as Vetera castra and several times simply as Vetera.

The name "Vetera" is of uncertain meaning, but it is believed to have originated from a nearby pre-Roman settlement of the Cugerni. Its Germanic name was Romanised and transferred to the fort site. (Note: However, it is uncertain whether this could be the Cugerni settlement in the area of the Colonia Ulpia Traiana (the so-called "core settlement"). Instead, it is believed that there was at least one other Cugerni settlement in the Birten area that has not yet been archaeologically confirmed.) In his 1839 publication on the antiquities of Xanten, Philipp Houben used the term "Castra Vetera" in a reversal of the name handed down by Tacitus. This term has since found its way onto maps and into everyday language, (Note: Houben's word twist and the resulting theoretical translation of Castra Vetera as "Old Camp" also spread outside Germany. In English-speaking countries, especially on the web, the term Castra Vetera or "The Old Camp" is still sometimes used today.) although it never existed in this form. In scientific literature, the correct terms "Vetera" (with the differentiations between "Vetera I" and "Vetera II") or "Vetera Castra" have been used since at least Hans Lehner's time (1866-1938).

== Research history ==
Following their abandonment, the Roman military camps were repurposed as quarries. Initially, the Romans themselves used the stone material from Vetera I to expand the neighbouring Colonia Ulpia Traiana. Later, in the Middle Ages, the remaining ruins were used for the construction of the monastery on the Fürstenberg. Vetera II disappeared around the year 1200 when the Rhine formed a loop extending to the south, undermining the previously flood-free site of the fort. As a result, the possible findings and features of Vetera II are now located five to ten metres below the visible surface, under the gravel and water of the old-Rhein and Bislicher Insel.

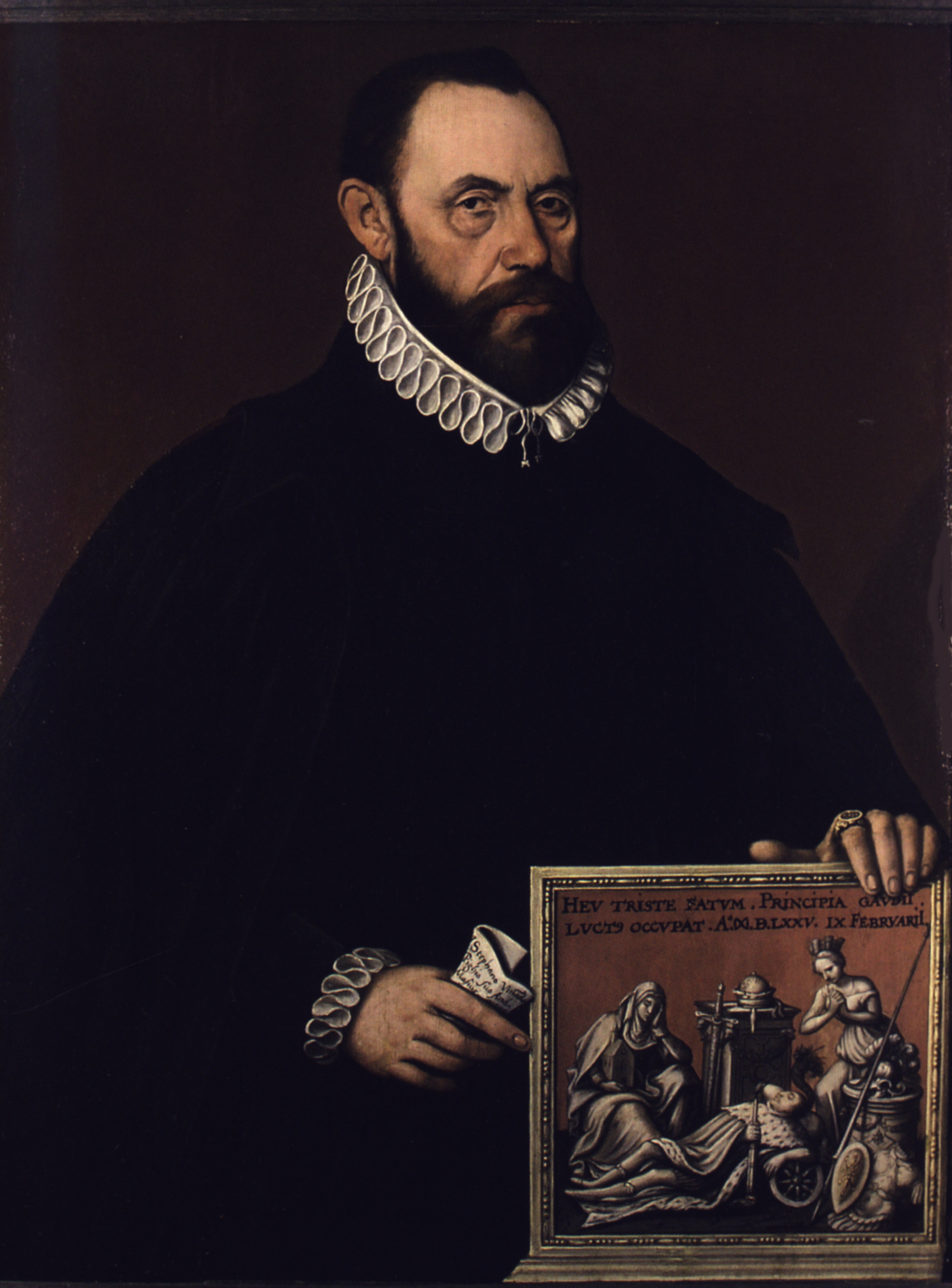
Stephanus Winandus Pighius, Painting from around 1585, Deventer

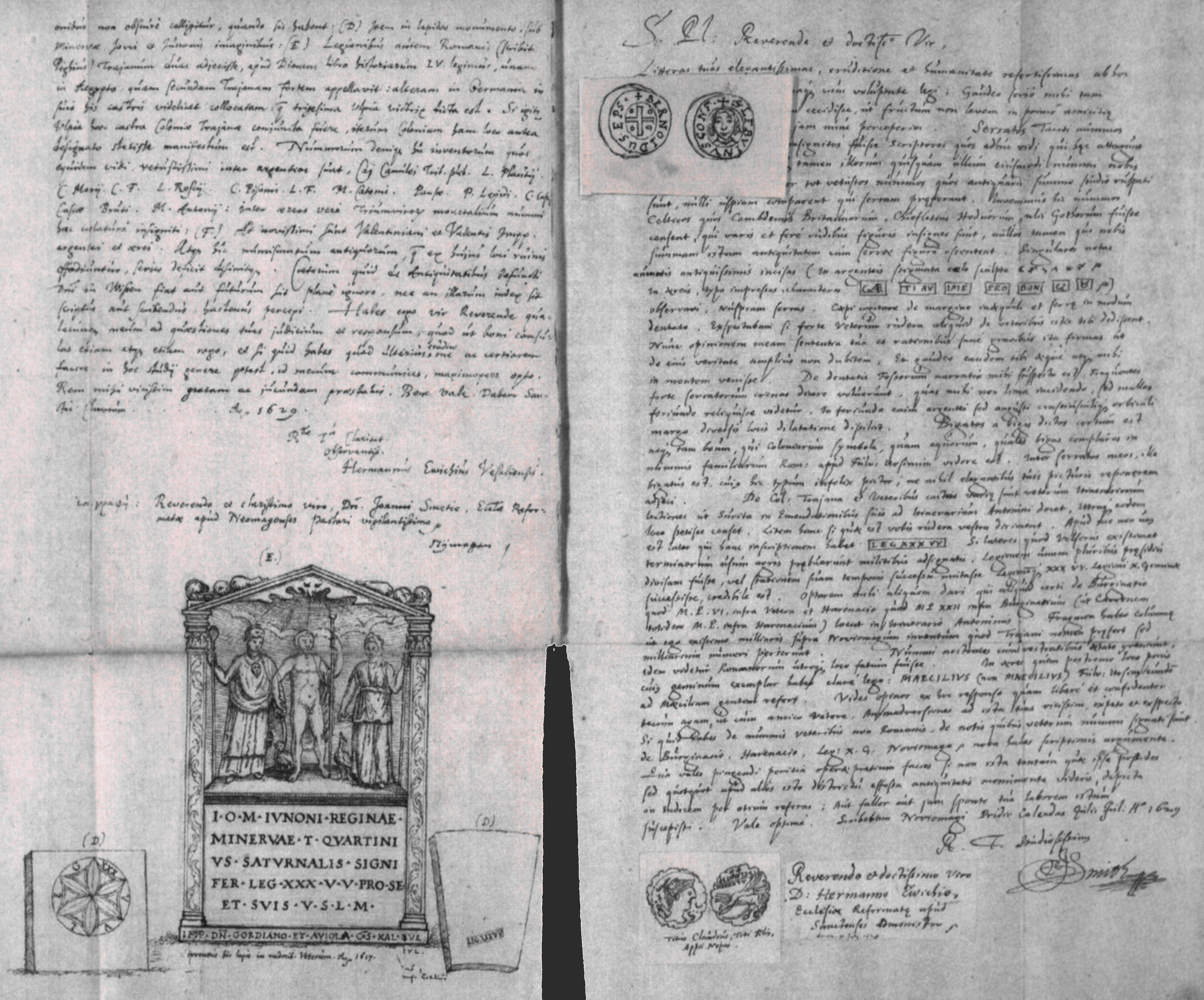
Record by H. Ewich with the image of a consecration stone (CIL XIII, 8625

The large number of Roman remains in the Xanten area aroused the interest of scholars early on. Stephanus Winandus Pighius (1526-1604), scholaster and canon at the collegiate church since 1575, was the first to make a systematic record (Note: Stephani Vinandi Pighii Annales Romanorum. Antwerp, 1615. (Original collection)) of the Roman remains. From 1623 to 1633, Johannes Turck illustrated the appendix to a chronicle of Kleve by Gert van der Schuiren with drawings of ancient remains. He was followed by the Wesel priest Hermann Ewich, who documented the antiquities of his home region between 1628 and 1654, and the theologian and humanist Werner Teschenmacher (1590-1638). In the late 17th and 18th centuries, the Vynen parish priest Theodor Tack and, above all, the Xanten parish priest Johannes Spenrath devoted themselves to the ancient heritage of the Xanten region.

Pighius previously expressed concern about the ongoing exploitation of Roman ruins. Despite the growing interest and objections from scholars, this exploitation continued without interruption. Between 1714 and 1716, Johannes Spenrath, the parish priest, reported over 5000 tonnes of stones excavated from the former legionary camp Vetera I. Stone excavations from the Middle Ages to modern times, which are well-documented in older sources, were so extensive that the lack of visible traces today is unsurprising. Even the targeted excavations carried out since the early modern period were not scientific investigations using field archaeological methods as we know them today. The focus of interest was solely on the find itself, and the context of the find was often ignored or not recognised. Early scholars were collectors of antiquities rather than archaeologists, and their approach to excavations contributed to the irretrievable destruction of many findings.

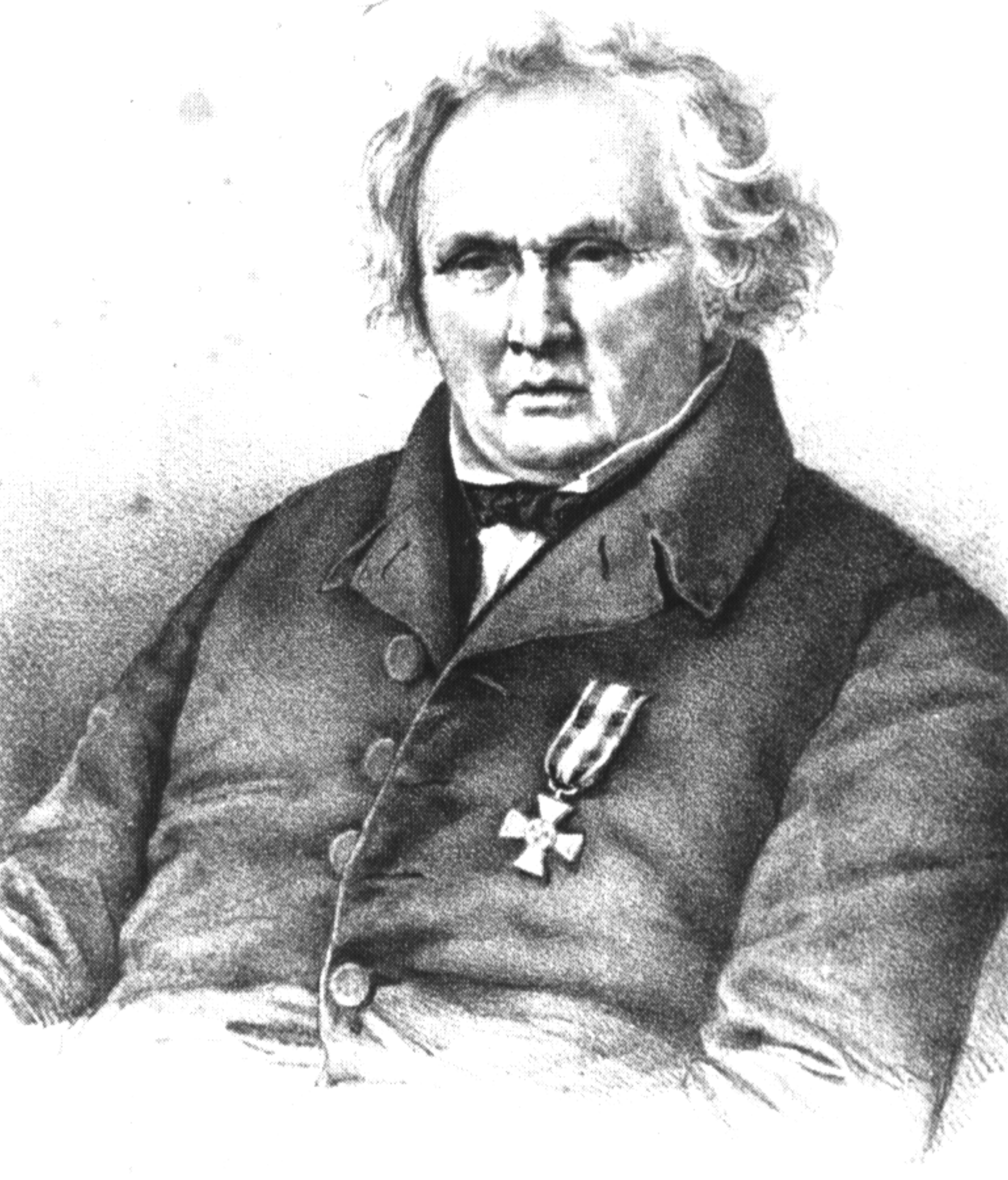
Philipp Houben (1767–1855)

Philipp Houben (1767-1855) was a pivotal figure in the transition from antiquities collecting to scientific archaeology. Upon arriving in Xanten in 1798, Houben was inspired by Johannes Spenrath to study antiquities. In 1803, he established the first Xanten Museum by purchasing the old provost's house and displaying ancient artefacts in it. Between 1819 and 1844, he financed and carried out extensive excavations in the area of the legionary camps, the CUT, and the burial grounds. Houben was more meticulous than his predecessors and was the first to document not only the finds, but also the excavations and sites themselves. Working in the Xanten area at around the same time and partly together with Houben, the Wesel senior teacher Franz Fiedler (1790-1876) complemented Houben's graphic documentation with texts.

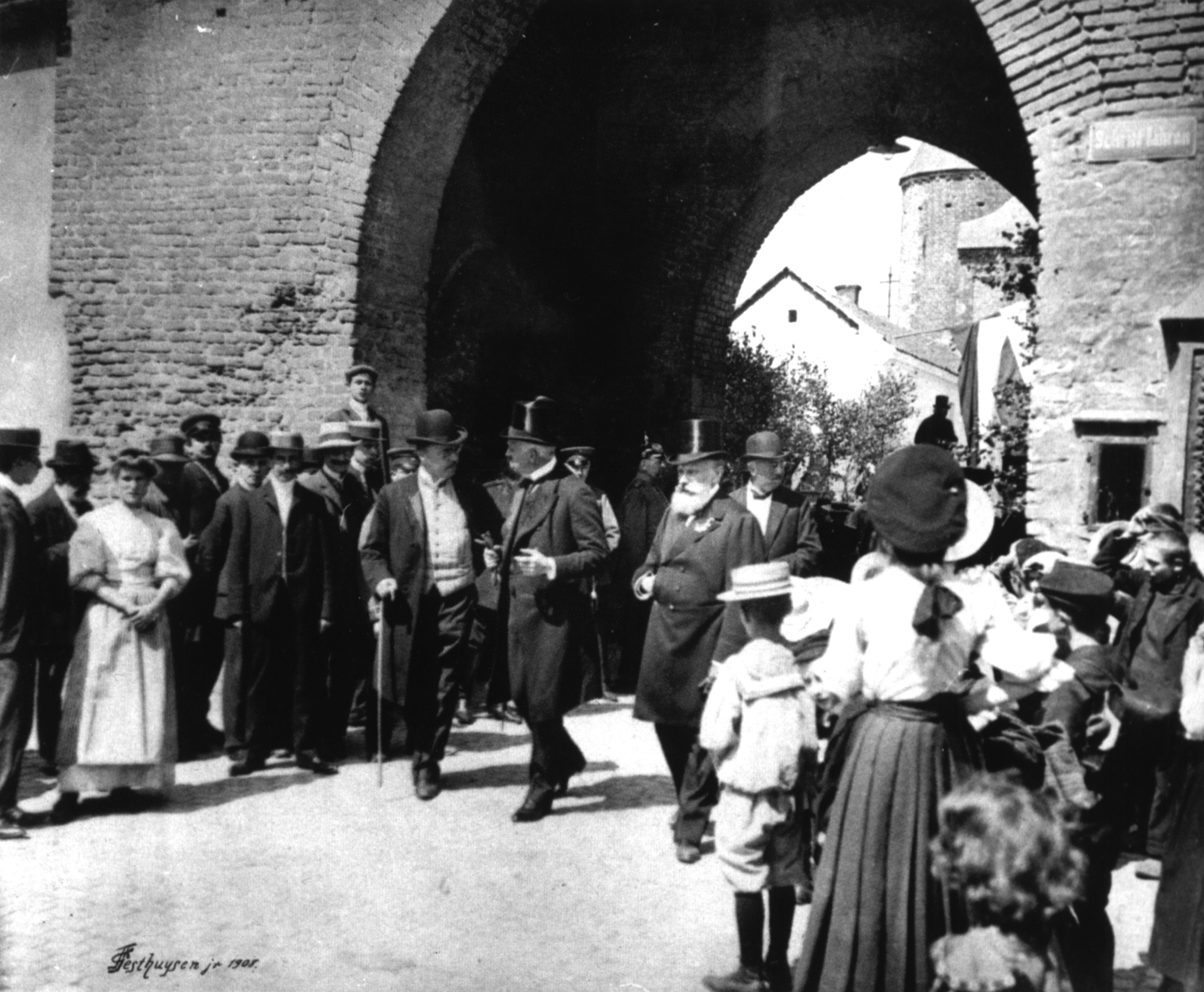
Opening of the first museum of the Lower Rhine Antiques Society in the Klever Tor (1908)

The Lower Rhine Antiquities Society was founded in 1877 by Josef Steiner, a doctor from Xanten, marking a significant milestone in the development of modern archaeology. The society conducted extensive excavations in various locations, including the CUT, the Fürstenberg, nearby graveyards and the hinterland of Xanten, where a brickworks built by Legio XXII Primigenia was discovered. The society worked closely with the scholars of the Provinzialmuseum Bonn, the predecessor of the LVR-Landesmuseum Bonn, from which it also received financial support. The establishment of the society's archaeological collection, which was published by Paul Steiner, the son of the society's founder and later head of department at the Landesmuseum Trier, was also an important event in the history of German archaeology.

Archaeological excavations in the area around Fürstenberg, in a systematic, comprehensive and modern fashion, began in 1905 under the direction of Hans Lehner, who was also the director of the Provinzialmuseum Bonn from 1899 to 1930. During excavations carried out between 1905 and 1914, and from 1925 to 1933, Lehner and his successor Franz Oelmann (1883-1963) precisely determined the location of Vetera I. They were successful in distinguishing between different camps with different dates or, rather, phases of construction, and in uncovering parts of the defences and internal buildings. These excavations identified the canaba, which was the civilian suburb of the camp, and the location of the burial grounds. The amphitheatre was also excavated and dated. However, the main focus of these excavations was on the stone fort, with the earlier construction phases only being briefly considered.

The search for Vetera II was unsuccessful for a long time. Despite some speculations pointing to the area around Bislicher Insel, no evidence was found. It was only an accumulation of finds in connection with the gravel removals that began after the Second World War that alerted the archaeologist Wilhelm Piepers, who was working in Xanten at the time. In 1955, 1957, and 1958, Harald von Petrikovits commissioned underwater archaeological investigations that definitively identified the former legionary camp and determined its extent with sufficient precision.

== Historical background ==
Following Gaius Julius Caesar's Gallic Wars (58 to 51/50 BCE), a population vacuum emerged in the Lower Rhine region, which was dangerous for the Romans. Marcus Vipsanius Agrippa, who served as governor of Gaul around 39/38 BCE and 20 to 18 BCE, made efforts to address this issue by resettling Germanic peoples, establishing administrative structures, and constructing a long-distance road network. During this period, the Rhine was still considered the boundary of the Roman sphere of interest. The primary objective was to secure and develop the provinces conquered by Caesar. There was no immediate plan for further expansionist policies, as the legions were widely dispersed throughout the Gallic hinterland.

The situation changed due to ongoing attacks by Germanic peoples on the west bank of the Rhine. These attacks culminated in the Clades Lolliana battle in 17 or 16 BCE, where the Roman governor Marcus Lollius was defeated by a united force of the Sicambri, Tencteri and Usipetes. The battle had a greater political effect than any military consequences and led to a fundamental change in Roman policy towards the Germanic peoples. In 16 BCE, Augustus personally travelled to Gaul to resolve the "Germanic question" once and for all. He spent three years there, first defeating the Rhaetians and pacifying the region between the Alps and the Danube. His next step was to reorganise the deployment of the Lower Germanic army starting from 15 BCE.

The Rhine line ceased to be a defensive barrier and was transformed into an offensive deployment base against the Germanic territories located east of the river. The troops that became available after the Alpine campaign were relocated to the Rhine, and the legionary camps of Noviomagus, near Nijmegen, and Vetera were built. Recent literature has questioned whether the Augustan Germanic Wars of 12 BCE to 16 CE, which had a more offensive orientation, aimed to occupy Germania on the right bank of the Rhine as far as the Elbe, as had long been assumed.

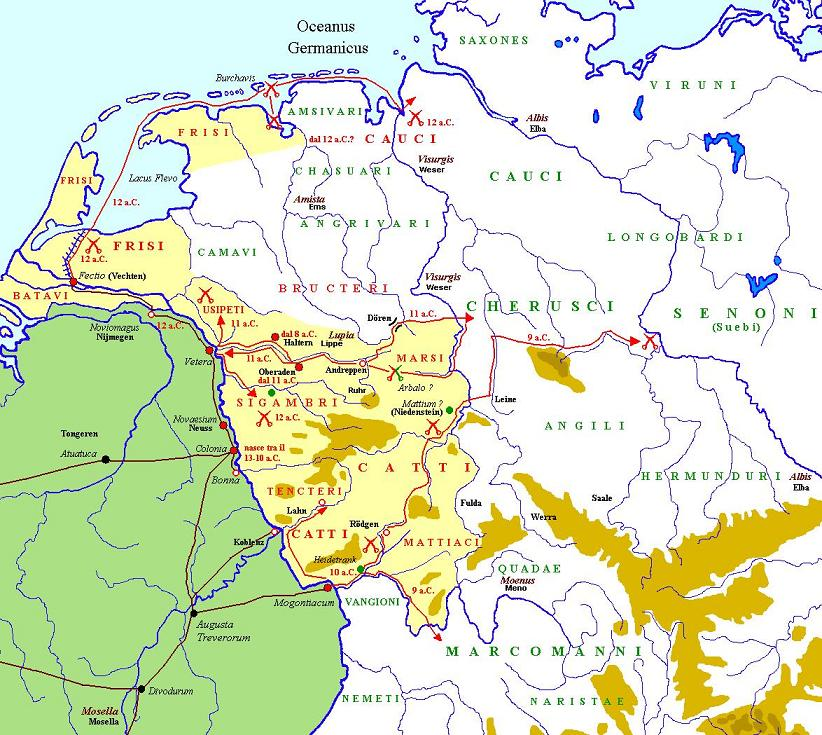
Campaigns of Drusus (The places indicated do not necessarily correspond to the current state of scholarship).

In 13 BCE, Augustus returned to Rome and handed over supreme command to his stepson Drusus, who led a large-scale offensive against the Germanic peoples from 12-8 BCE. Vetera likely served as a base of operations for Drusus' campaigns into Germania on the eastern bank of the Rhine. Its location, opposite the mouth of the Lippe, was ideal as the Lippe valley provided access far into enemy territory. The territories of the Sicambri and Usipetes were also easily reachable from Vetera.

With Vetera as a base, flanked by the auxiliary fort of Asciburgium and the new legionary camp of Oberaden on the right bank of the Rhine, established by Drusus, the Sicambri could be constrained. Drusus conducted four campaigns into Germania on the right bank of the Rhine, with the main activities shifting to the territory of the Chatti during the conflicts. Following his premature death, the campaigns were continued by Tiberius (9-6 BCE), Lucius Domitius Ahenobarbus (around 3 BCE), and Marcus Vinicius (immensum bellum, 1 to 5 CE). Tiberius regained command in 4 CE.

However, in the spring of the year 6 CE, the operations had to be cancelled due to an uprising in the province of Pannonia, which required the presence of the commander and part of the legions. Publius Quinctilius Varus (7-9) succeeded as governor, but was less fortunate, leading to the Clades Variana, also known as the "Battle of the Teutoburg Forest" in 9 CE. This battle resulted in the destruction of three legions, three alae, and six cohorts. During that event, the army was likely returning to Vetera. It is highly probable that two of the legions, Legio XVIII Augusta and Legio XVII Augusta, which perished, were previously stationed at the camp.

Germanicus (15 BCE–19 CE)

Subsequently, the Romans evacuated all garrisons on the east bank of the Rhine and reduced their ambitions towards Germania. Tiberius, who had returned to the Rhine, focused on strengthening and consolidating the river frontier. The number of legions on the Rhine was increased from six to eight. Legio V Alaudae and Legio XXI Rapax replaced the lost units from Vetera, which, in 11/12 CE, was designated as the capital of the newly established Lower Germanic army district (Exercitus Germanicus Inferior).

Following Tiberius' return to Rome in 12 AD, Germanicus took over as supreme commander in the Rhineland the following year. He planned additional offensives into Germania on the east bank of the Rhine. First, he had to quell a mutiny of the Rhineland legions in 14 AD, who had rebelled against Tiberius, Augustus' successor, after the first emperor's death. Legions V and XXI from Vetera, along with two other legions, were involved in this mutiny. They had been brought together in a summer camp, presumably in the so-called 'Camp C' in Novaesium. Subsequently, the Roman army began large-scale and costly advances into free Germania, known as the Germanicus campaigns. Germanicus led the southern wing of the army from Mogontiacum (Mainz), while Aulus Caecina Severus commanded the northern army group from Vetera.

Campaigns of Germanicus and A. Caecina Severus in the years 14-16

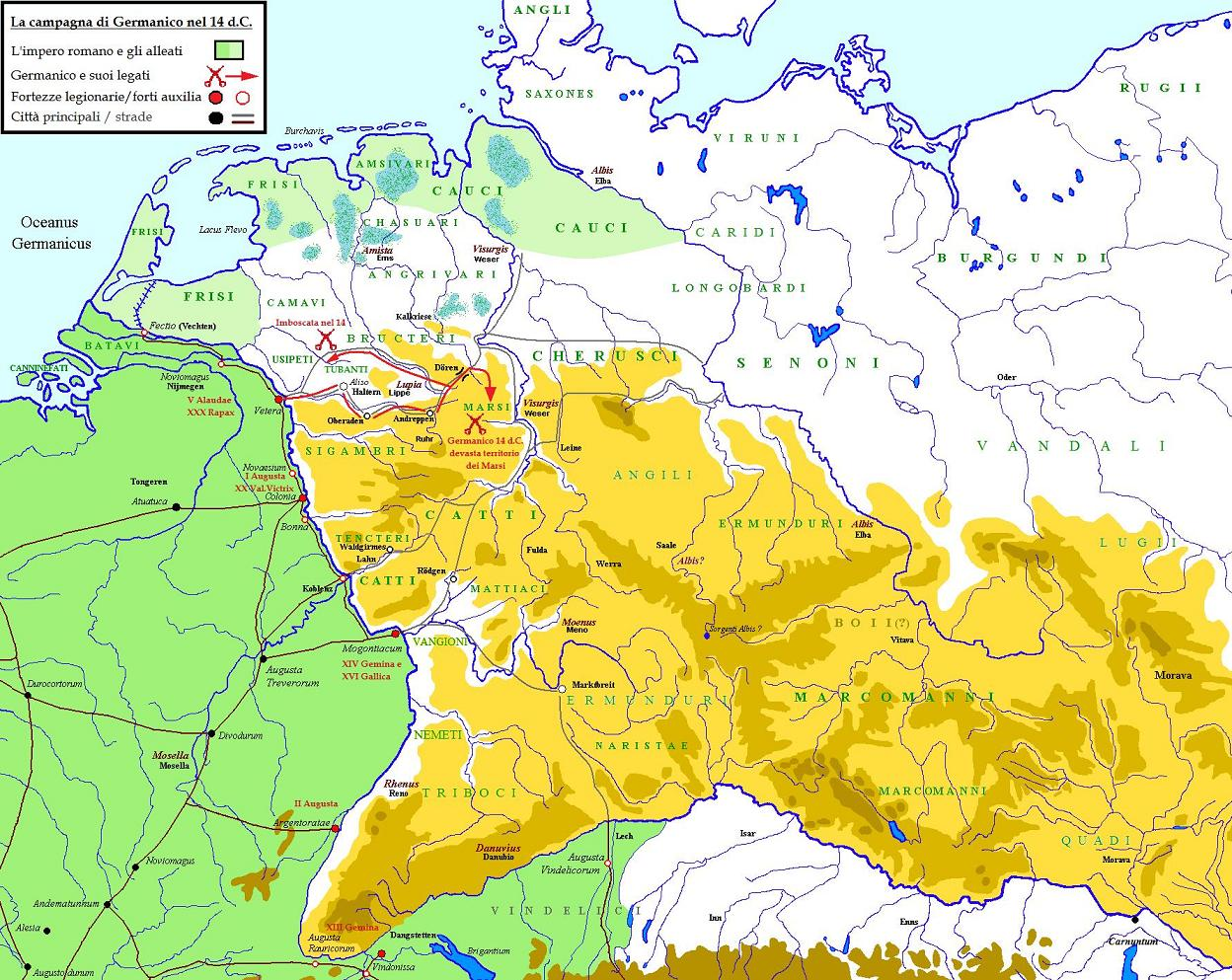
Military operations in the year 14

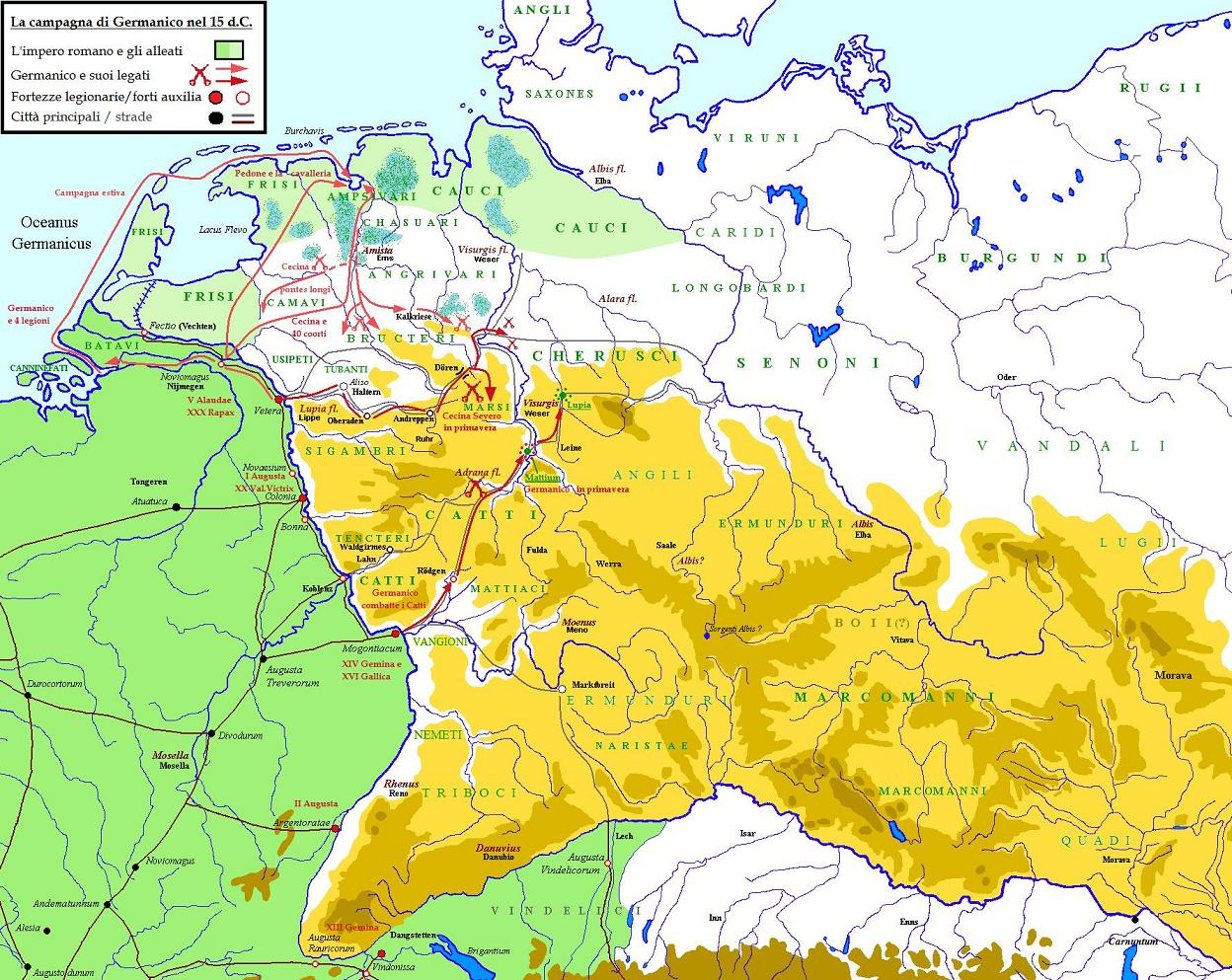
Campaigns of the year 15

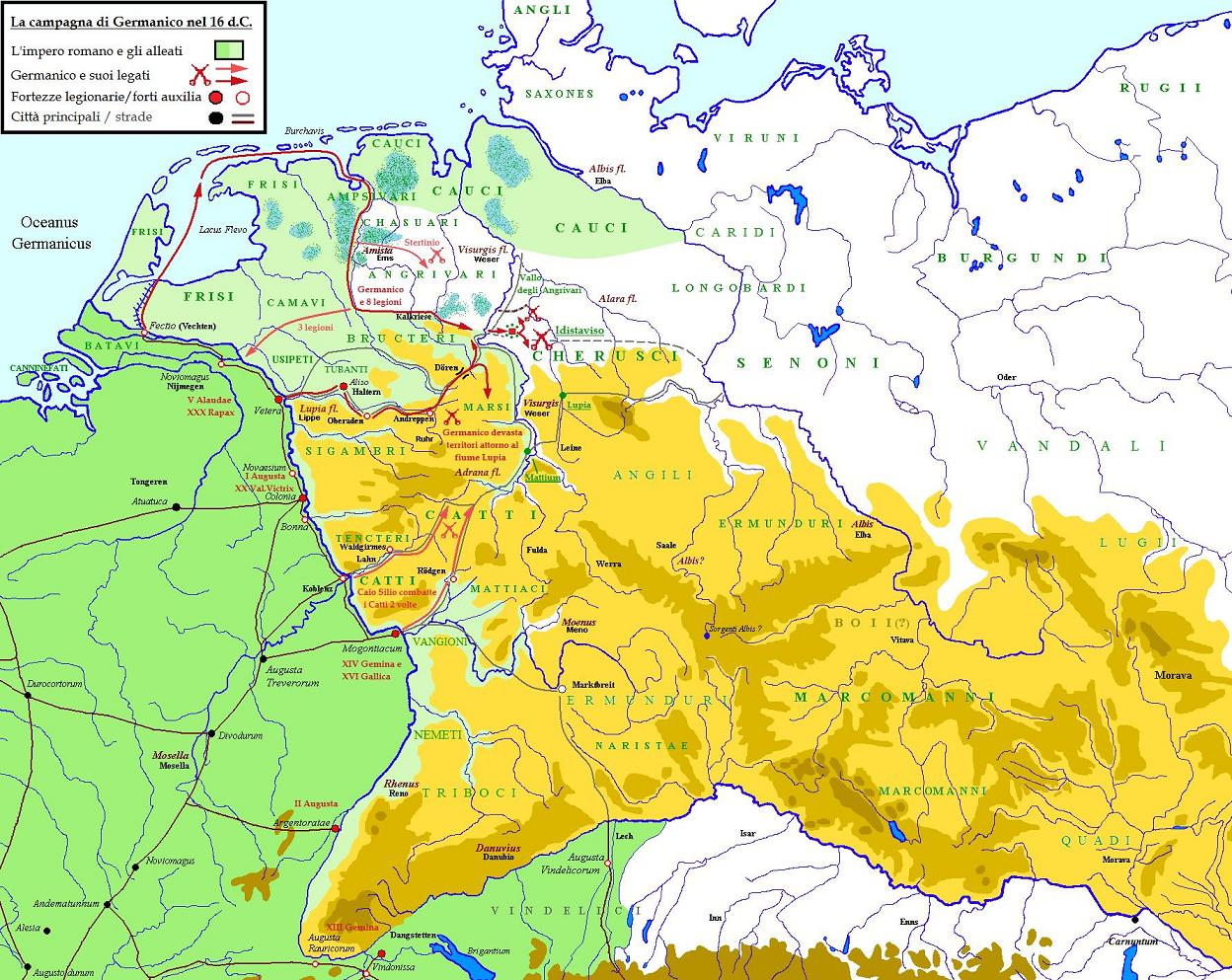
Operations of the year 16

In 16 CE, after unsuccessful and expensive campaigns, Tiberius terminated the risky offensive and ordered Germanicus to return to Rome. Following this, the Lower Rhine became a defensive border, resulting in relative peace in Vetera for over fifty years. During the time of Claudius, the road network connecting the military camps in the Rhineland was expanded. However, this peaceful situation changed with the Revolt of the Batavi and other events of 69-70, which were to shake the entire empire.

== Vetera I ==
Vetera I
- Vetera Castra, Castra Vetera
- Interactive map of Vetera I
- 51°38′47″N 6°28′12″E
- Type: (Double) legionary camp
- Associated with: A.a) Legio XVIII Augusta A.b) Legio XVII Augusta; B.a) Legio XXI Rapax; B.b) Legio V Alaudae C) Legio XV Primigenia
- Location: Xanten-Birten
- Region: Germania Inferior
- Part of: Lower Germanic Limes

History
- Built: 13/12 BCE
- Abandoned: 70 CE

Site notes
- Material: a) Wood/soil camp b) Wood/soil camp with stone interior construction
- Area: Wall: 902 m × 621 m Total surface: 926 m × 636/640 m (Note: 636 m at the rear, 640 m along the Via Principalis)
- Condition: Archaeological monument; only amphitheatre visible
- Preceded by Burginatium (to the north-west); followed by Wesel-Büderich fort (to the east); next to Vetera II (to the east; later).

=== Legionary camp ===
==== Augustean-Tiberian period ====
The precise date of the founding of this first camp cannot be accurately determined, either historically or archaeologically. It falls within the period when Augustus' Germanic policy became more expansive after the Clades Lolliana from 16 BCE, ultimately culminating in the Drusus campaigns (12-8 BCE). According to archaeological evidence, the years immediately before the start of the offensive, i.e. 13/12 BCE, are the most likely. At least seven different ditch systems (ditches A-A' to G-G') (Note: A-A' = early Augustan, B-B' = last decade before the turn of the millennium, C-C' = Augustan of the Oberaden type, D-D' = beginning of the first century CE, E-E' and F-F' = before the construction of the stone camp, G-G' = Augustan) from this period were found. However, it does not rule out an earlier foundation date, despite the lack of findings that date these features. In addition to the ditches, a pottery kiln (another can be dated to the Early Claudian period) and several rubbish pits have been archaeologically recorded from these camps, built purely as wood/soil constructions.

The initial camps likely functioned as a foundation for the campaigns into Germania on the east bank of the Rhine and for controlling the lower Rhine (Rhenus) and the Lippe (Lupia). According to Hans Lehner, Vetera was not yet a permanent camp during this early stage. Instead, after their summer campaigns, the legions would have likely utilized the flood-free Fürstenberg as their winter quarters each year. This would account for the significant number of camp ditches. It is uncertain whether the camp was already a double-legionary camp at this time. The earliest known record of two legions stationed at Vetera dates from 14 CE.

Legio XVIII and Legio XVII were probably stationed in Vetera before their departure for Germania on the eastern bank of the Rhine, which ended with their destruction at the Battle of the Teutoburg Forest. This is supported by the discovery of the tombstone of Marcus Caelius, a centurion of the XVIII Legion from Bononia, which is now known as Bologna.

The stone bears the inscription:

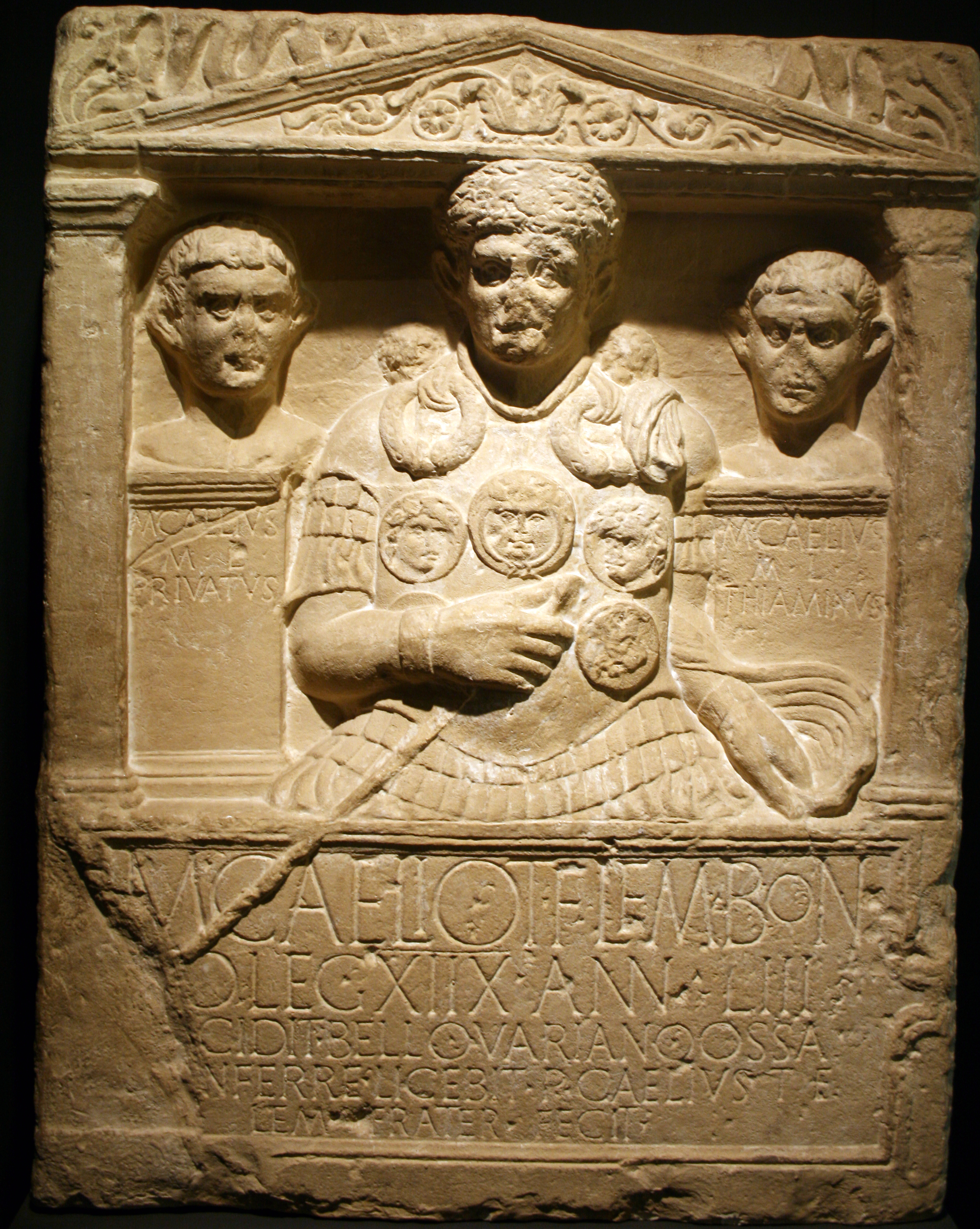
Caelius epitaph

M(ARCO) CAELIO T(ITI) F(ILIO) LEM(ONIA TRIBV) BON(ONIA)
[I] O(RDINI) LEG(IONIS) XIIX ANN(ORVM) LIII S(EMISSIS)
[CE]CIDIT BELLO VARIANO OSSA
[LIB(ERTORVM) I]NFERRE LICEBIT P(VBLIVS) CAELIVS T(ITI) F(ILIVS)
LEM(ONIA TRIBV) FRATER FECIT

Translated: "To Marcus Caelius, son of Titus, from the tribus Lemonia, from Bononia, centurion 1st order of the 18th legion, 53 years and a half old. He died in the war of Varus. The bones of the freedmen may be buried here. Publius Caelius, son of Titus, from the tribus Lemonia, his brother, made [this tombstone].".

This gravestone is believed to be part of a cenotaph, as Germanicus is said to have buried the fallen of the Varian defeat at the site of the event only six years later. It was discovered in the early 1620s, but its exact location is unknown. It likely originates from the burial grounds adjacent to the legionary camp, specifically from the Augustan burial ground on top of the Fürstenberg.

Following the Clades Variana, which led to the complete annihilation of three legions and their auxiliary units, Legio V Alaudae and Legio XXI Rapax were dispatched to Vetera to replace the lost legions. They are recorded from 14 CE, when they participated in the mutiny of the legions stationed in Germania and Pannonia upon Tiberius' ascension to power. Under the command of Aulus Caecina Severus, the legions participated in the Germanicus campaigns from the base of operations at Vetera between 14 and 16. However, due to a fundamental change in Germanic policy under Tiberius in 17, the garrison at Vetera assumed a more defensive role. The camp of the two legions was fortified in two phases, with a three-metre-wide wall made of wood and soil and a double ditch. No information is available about the inner buildings.

==== Claudian-Neronian period (41-68) ====
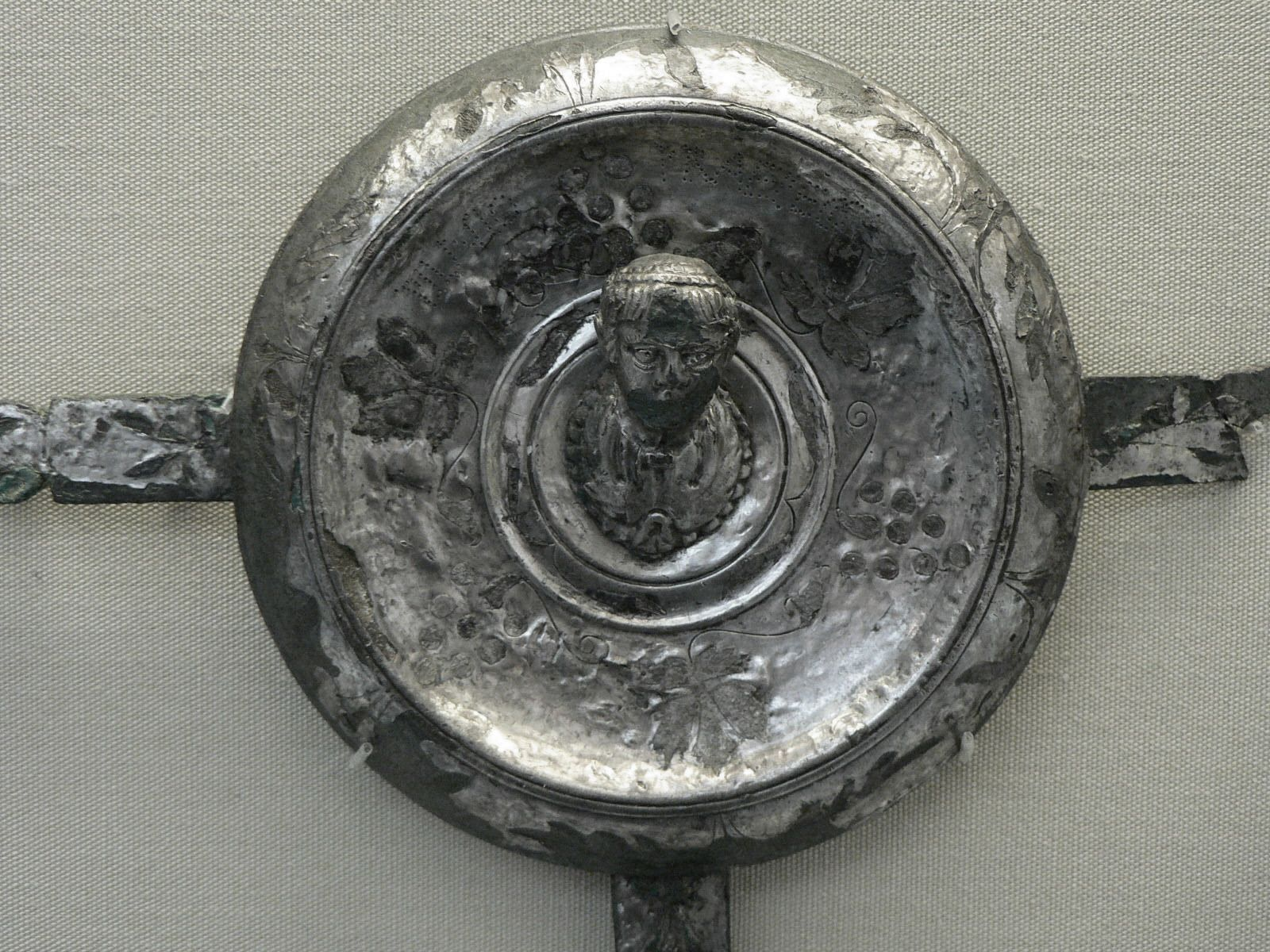
Pliny's phalera from Vetera, now in the British Museum, London

The two legions stood together in Vetera until Legio XXI Rapax was replaced by Legio XV Primigenia around the year 46. In this context, a new camp was built, with parts of the interior already made of stone. However, apart from a valetudinarium (military hospital) and some other walls of unknown purpose, nothing is known about the internal structure of this camp. Pliny the Elder is said to have been stationed here as prefect of an ala in the early to mid 50s of the 1st century CE, possibly in the year 57. This is suggested by the discovery of a phalera with the inscription PLINIO PRAEFEC(TO) EQ(uitum) [translated: by (in the sense of "under") the equestrian prefect Pliny]. (Note: It is therefore not a phalera of the prefect Pliny ("Plinii praefecti"), but one that was awarded under the prefect Pliny. According to Lehner (1926).)

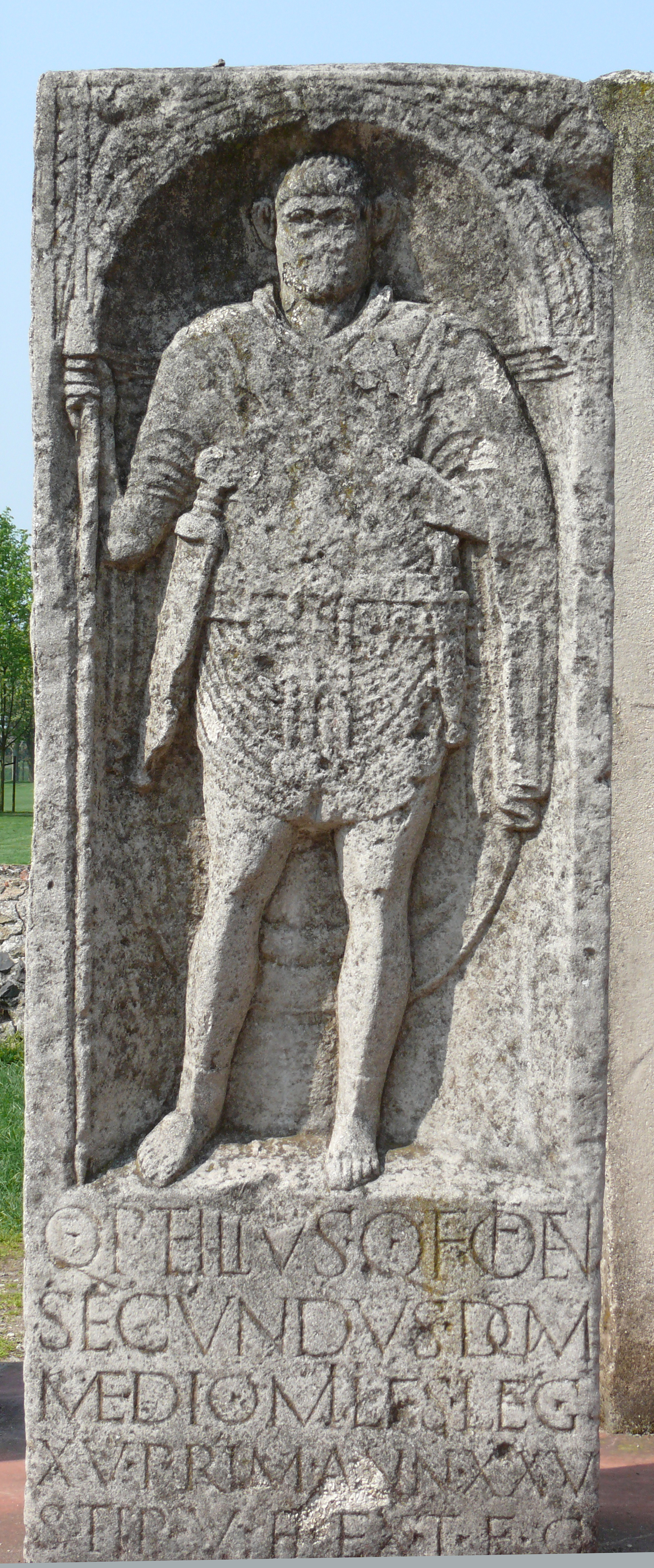
Gravestone of Quintus Petilius Secundus, soldier of Legio XV Primigenia (copy, now in the APX. Original in the Rheinisches Landesmuseum Bonn)

The best known of all the construction phases is the last camp of the V and XV legions, built around the year 60. The double legion camp was surrounded by a wall measuring 902 metres by 621 metres. With the rampart and ditch system in front of it, the dimensions were about 926 metres by 636/640 metres. (Note: 636 m at the rear, 640 m along the Via Principalis) The resulting total area of around 60 hectares makes it the largest known camp of its kind. The wall was three metres wide and consisted of wooden posts and piers into which mud bricks or simple mud blocks were inserted. The outer and inner sides were latticed, the compartments of which were filled with clay-plastered moulded bricks, and the battlements were covered with floor slabs. Corner and intermediate towers are suspected, but have not yet been archaeologically proven. The wall had a total of four gates with a passage width of between 8.50 m and 9.50 m, each flanked by two towers and equipped with a bridge. The front of the fort faced south, so that the porta praetoria (main gate) was at the foot of the hill and the porta decumana (rear gate) was on the ridge of the Fürstenberg. In front of the wall there were two pointed ditches (Note: Archaeological evidence only on the south side of the camp.) and branches as obstacles to approach. In front of the gates, the ditches curved slightly inwards, following the course of the wall, but were not aligned with it.

Investigations of the internal structures have essentially been confined to the centre of the camp. Large areas of the praetentura (front part) and the retentura (rear part) remain unexplored.

The camp was divided by two main roads, via praetoria and via decumana, running north-south, and via principalis, running east-west. The distribution of brick stamps found within the garrison clearly showed that the V legion occupied the western half of the camp, while the XV legion occupied the eastern half. The Via Principalis was flanked on both sides by porticoes, behind which there were mostly two-roomed tabernae (shops). The centre of the camp housed the principia, which was the garrison's staff and administration district. Behind it was another large administrative building, referred to as "Building G", which served as the residence and office building of the Praefectus Castrorum, the camp commander. The north-south alignment of the Via Praetoria and Via Decumana was interrupted by the two buildings. In this area, two streets ran past the two building complexes to the right and left. The principia was flanked by the two praetoria, which were the residential palaces of the legates, the commanders of the legions.

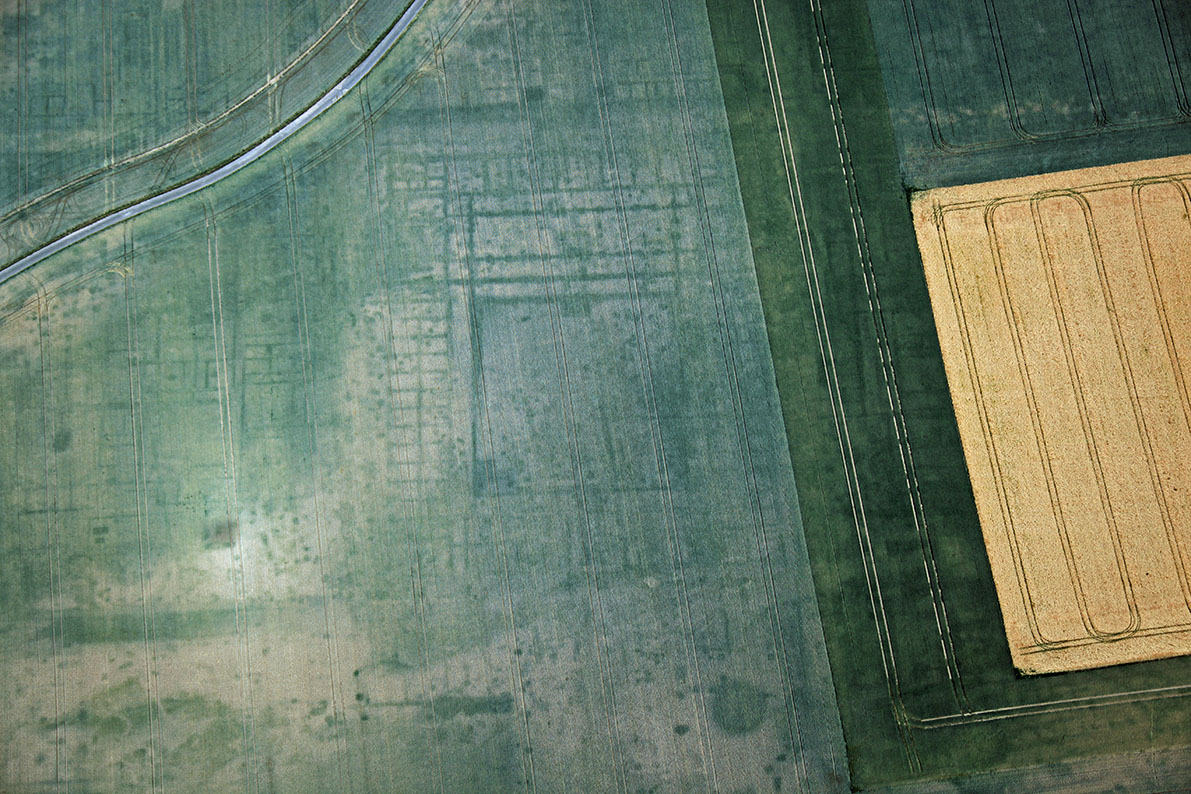
Aerial view of the central area of Vetera I; the structures of the Principia can be recognised through the ground

The principia was rectangular in shape, 120 metres long and 94.80 metres wide. The walls were made of greywacke, basalt and tuff with lime mortar. The complex was entered from the south, from the Via Praetoria, through a gate, which led to an almost square courtyard (61.80 by 64.80 metres), surrounded on all sides by porticoes. Behind the porticoes on the west, south and east sides of the courtyard were two rows of chambers, most of which have been interpreted as armamentaria (armouries). To the north was a three-nave basilica supported by columns, probably for sacred purposes. Remains of mural paintings and fragments of richly decorated capitals indicate an elaborate interior. On the western side was the sacellum of the V legion and on the eastern side that of the XV legion, where the standards, the troop treasury and the images of the legionary gods were kept. On the north side of the basilica, the complex was closed by a nine-room flight of steps.

The praetoria, the two palaces of the legates, were located to the west and east of the Principia and were oriented towards it with their entrance gates and porticoes. The building complexes were arranged around three peristyle courtyards, one of which had an elongated shape with rounded apses and was described as a magnificent garden complex. The western legate palace of the commander of the V Legion was 97 metres long and 77 metres wide, including the portico. The eastern palace, that of the commander of the XV Legion, measured 109 metres by 78.50 metres.

To the north of the Principia was the so-called "Building G". It measured 124.50 metres from north to south and 95.40 metres from east to west. The building complex consisted of a large number of smaller rooms arranged around several larger courtyards and halls. However, too little research has been carried out into the internal structure of the building to be able to determine the function of the rooms. The interpretation of the building as a residential and administrative building for the camp commander, the praefectus castrorum, is also hypothetical and not entirely certain.

Four almost structurally identical houses have been identified as tribune palaces. However, only three of these (Buildings K, J and M) were excavated in their entirety, and of another (Building Q), only the western room alignment was uncovered. These were peristyle houses with an almost square floor plan measuring approximately 39 metres in width and 41 metres in length. Buildings K, J and M were situated adjacent to each other to the north of the legate palace of the V legion. Building Q was discovered to the east of the praetorium of the XV legion. Additionally, five more buildings, (Note: Buildings a, b, c, S and L.) four of which were located along the Via Principalis, were identified as staff quarters. The floor areas of these buildings ranged from 2410 m² to 3208 m².

Among the other large buildings in the inner area, only a valetudinarium (military hospital) appears to have an undisputable function. The building is a square with a side length of 83.50 metres. Two rows of rooms, separated by a corridor, run around an inner courtyard measuring 43 metres by 39 metres on three sides. These rooms were used to accommodate the wounded and sick. On the north side, there was a column-supported hall, which is interpreted as an operating room. This military hospital, known as valetudinarium, was situated in the western section of the camp, near the porta principalis dextra (right-side gate) and was therefore assigned to the Vth Legion. It was previously assumed that there was a second hospital for the XV Legion, which has now been confirmed by aerial photographs in the eastern half of the "Praetentura".

==== Vetera during the Year of the Four Emperors (69) and the Revolt of the Batavi (69/70) ====
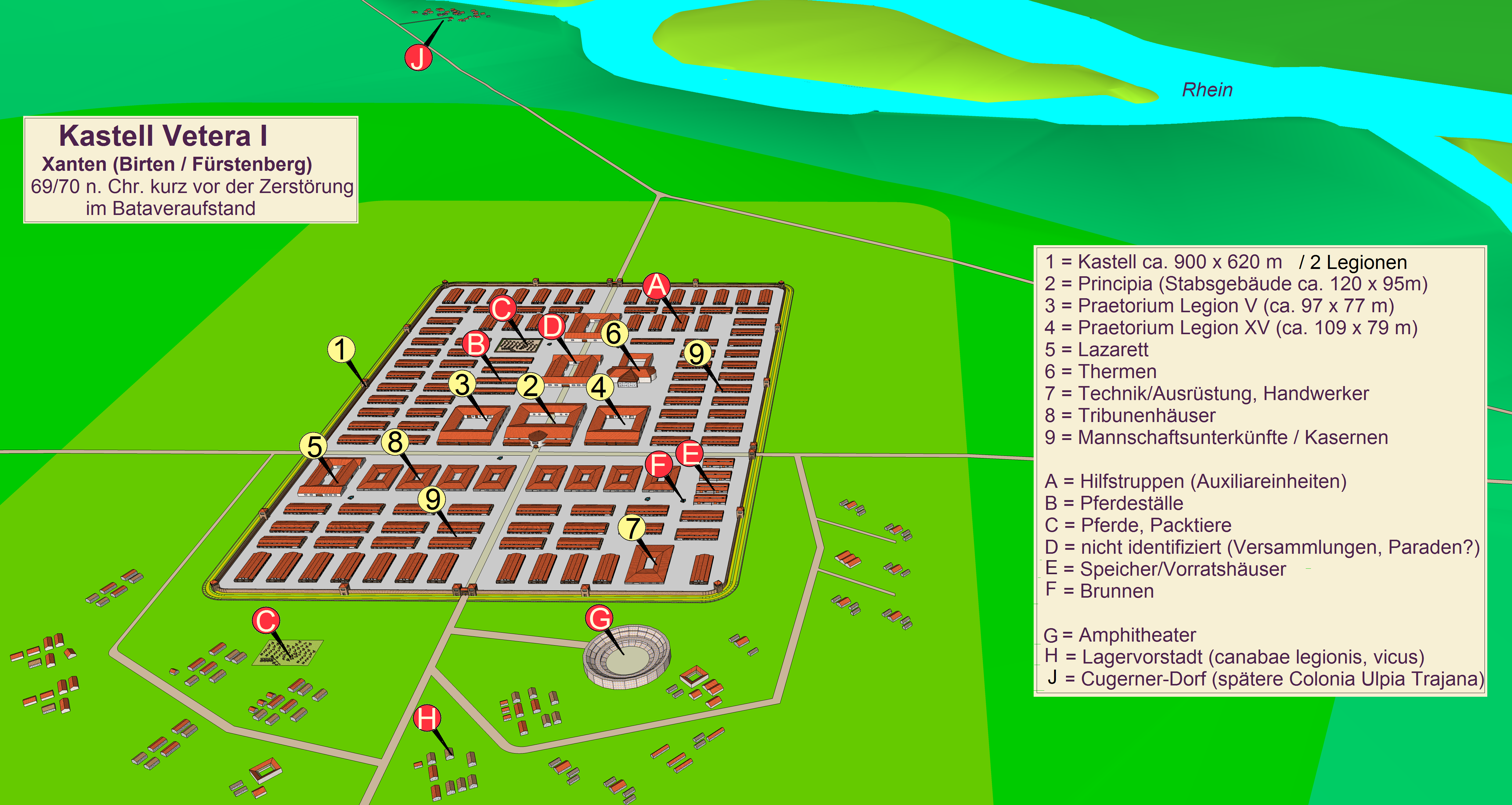
Fort Vetera I (Xanten-Birten) ca. 70 CE shortly before its destruction in the Revolt of the Batavi - location of important buildings archaeologically proven, building form partly hypothetical. Source: LVR Roman Museum Xanten.

During the events of 69/70, the Rhineland, along with the Italian mainland, became the most implicated region of the empire after decades of relative calm. The legionary camp of Vetera I played an important role, which was also its last, in direct connection with the Revolt of the Batavi. This occurred after decades of relative calm, and against the backdrop of turmoil that shook the entire empire.

After Nero, Galba became the emperor, but his unpopular personnel decisions antagonised the Lower Germanic army. As a result, they proclaimed Vitellius as the emperor in January 69. To assert his claim to the throne in Rome, Vitellius marched to Italy with a large army in two columns. This army included approximately 4000 legionaries of Legio V from Vetera, and eight auxiliary cohorts of the Batavi. The other three Lower Rhine legions provided an additional 6000 legionaries. Approximately 70,000 men were withdrawn from the western provinces and army districts in total, which left the border defences severely exposed.

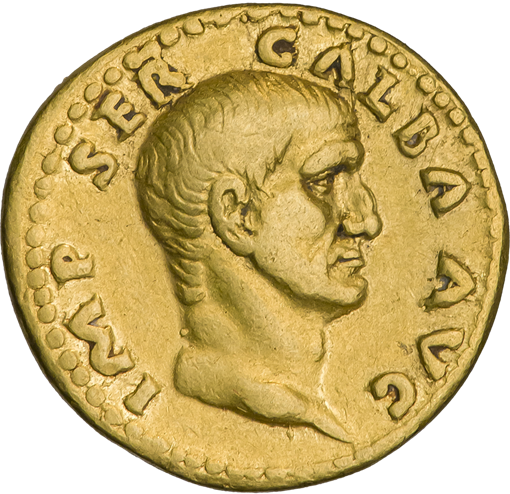
Galba

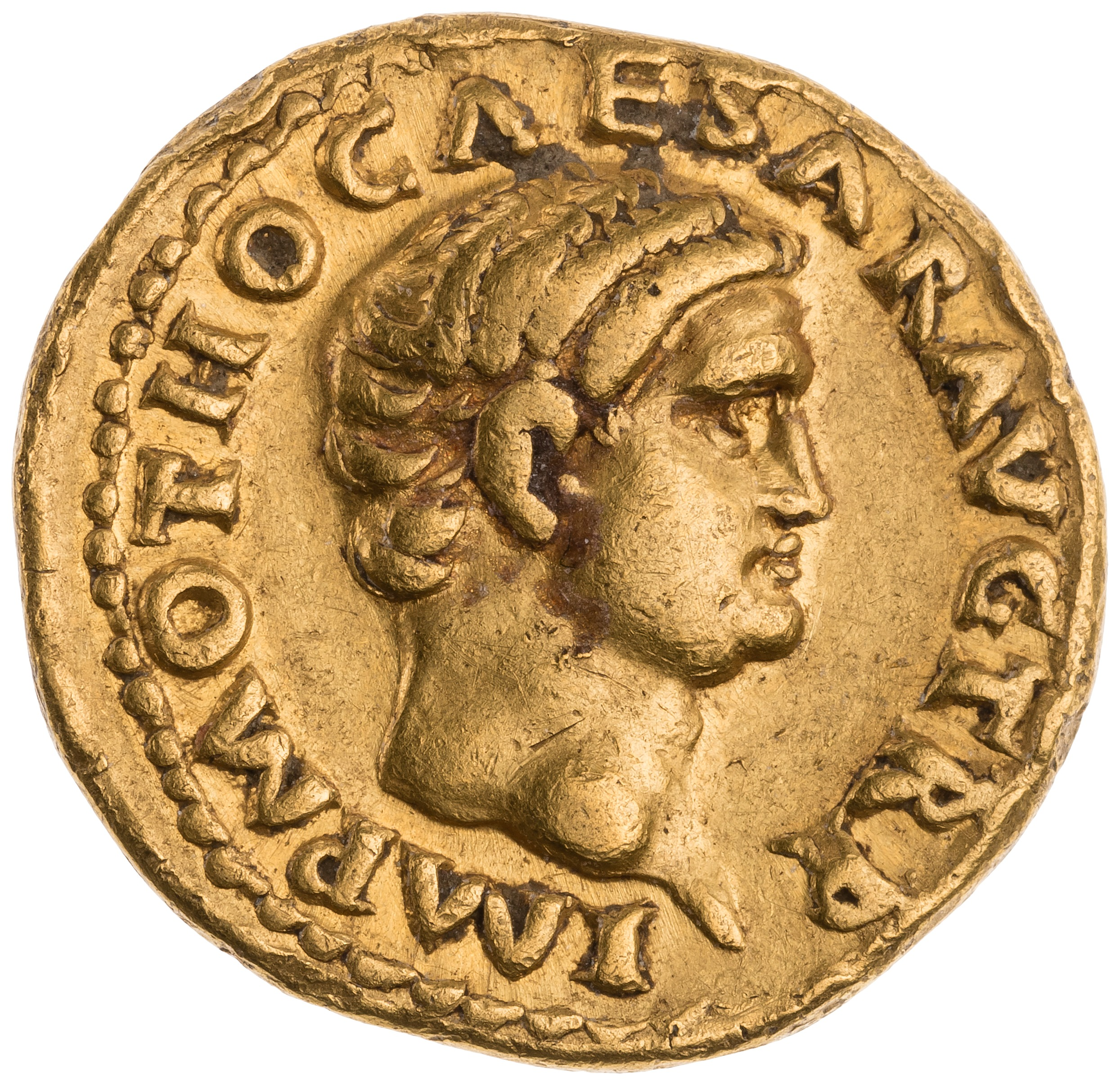
Otho

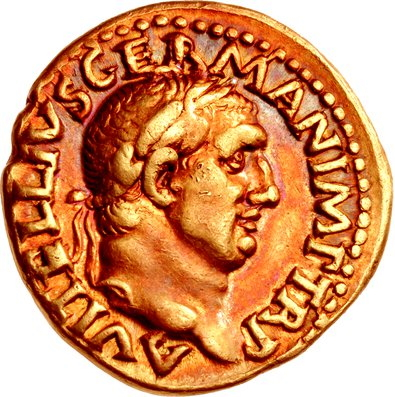
Vitellius

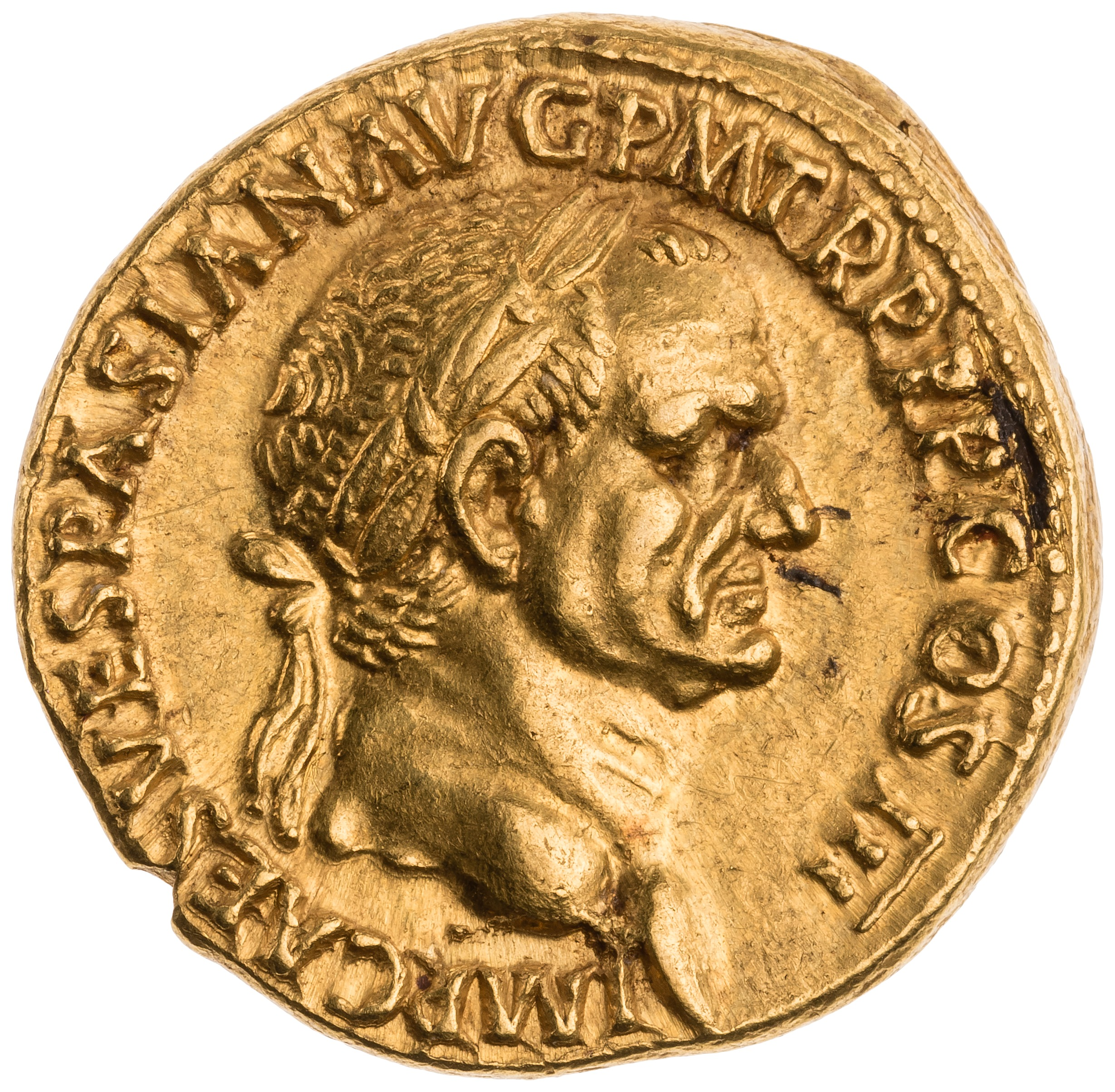
Vespasian

Following Vitellius' initial successes against Galba and his immediate successor Otho, the eight Batavian cohorts (comprising around 4,000 men) were ordered back to the Germanic border. They took up quarters at Mogontiacum in the summer of 69. Around the same time, Vespasian was acclaimed emperor in opposition to Vitellius in the provinces of Aegyptus, Syria, and Iudaea, as well as by the Danubian legions, in the eastern part of the empire. His troops subsequently marched towards Rome.

When Vitellius carried out military campaigns in the territories of the Batavi and Cananefates to strengthen his forces for the forthcoming clashes with Vespasian, the Batavi and Cananefates rose up together with the Frisians. They were led by Iulius Civilis, a Batavi nobleman and commander of a cohort. At first, Civilis skilfully managed to create the impression that he was intervening in the civil war on Vespasian's side against Vitellius. (Note: In this context, a letter from Marcus Antonius Primus to Civilis is often quoted, which probably reached its addressee in the late summer of 69 and in which the Batavi were called upon to intervene in the war on Vespasian's side. (Tacitus, Histories 4.13; see Barbara Levick: Vespasian. Routledge, London 1999, ISBN 0-415-16618-7, p. 108).) The Vitellian punitive expedition ended disastrously when the Batavi auxiliaries turned on them in mid-battle and the Ubii and Treveri fled. The remaining members of the expeditionary force barely managed to escape to Vetera.

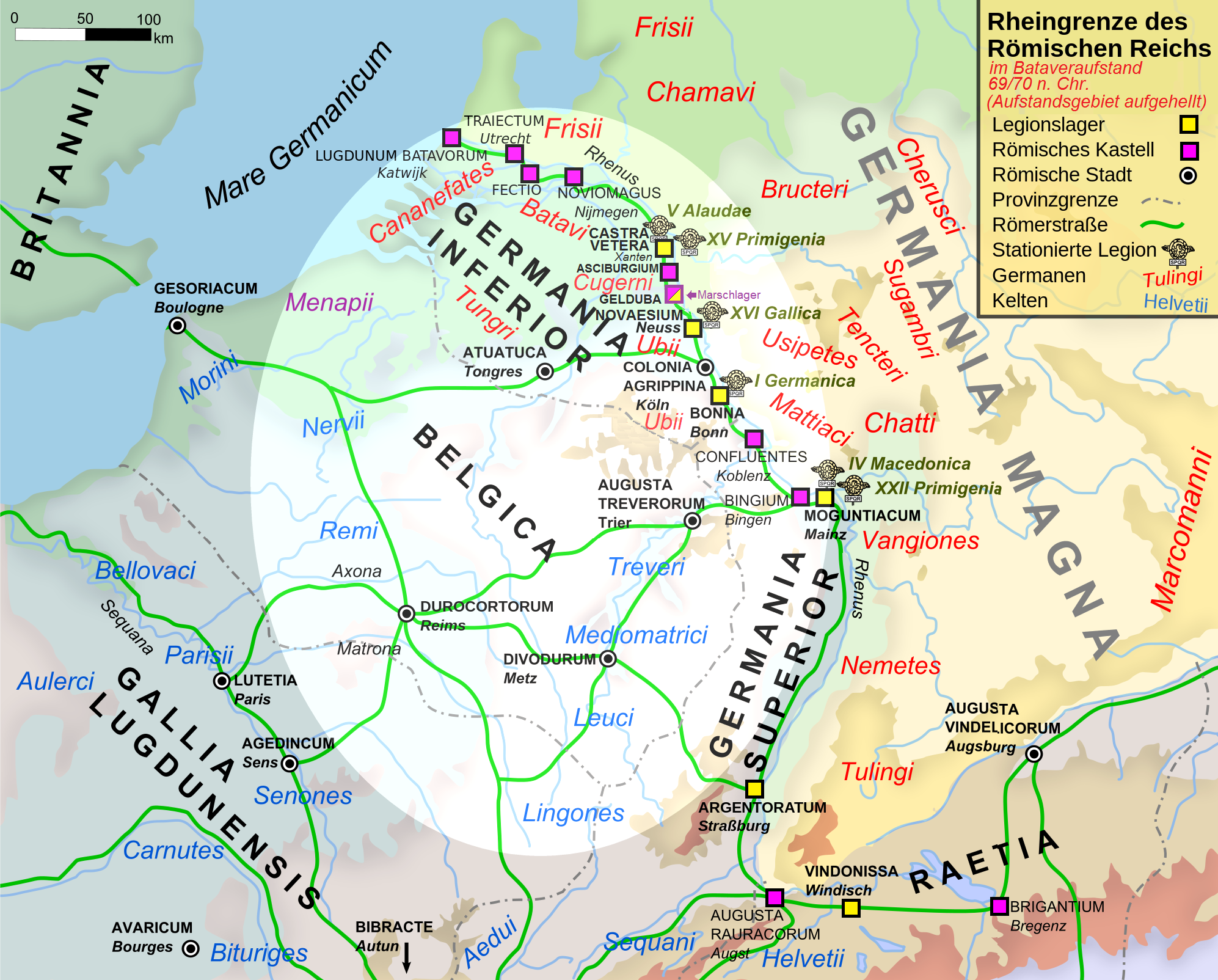
Revolt of the Batavi (69/70 CE). The area of the revolt is illuminated, including the location of the fort of Vetera

The rebellion gained momentum when the eight Batavi cohorts stationed in Mogontiacum marched north at the end of summer or the beginning of autumn in 69 and joined forces with Civilis' troops. Civilis swore them into Vespasian and also called on the remaining parts of the 5th and 15th legions stationed in Vetera to join Vespasian's cause. However, the garrison of Vetera remained loyal to Vitellius. The camp's walls and ramparts were reinforced, but there were insufficient provisions to withstand a prolonged siege. Following an unsuccessful initial attack, Civilis' troops, who had gained control of both banks of the Rhine and the Roman river fleet, decided to lay siege to the camp in an attempt to starve out the defenders. A relief army comprising soldiers from Legio XXII Primigenia, under the command of Gaius Dillius Vocula, marched from the south and joined forces with Legio XVI Gallica in Novaesium. However, they did not advance any further into the area around Vetera and instead established a camp near Gelduba. Meanwhile, the army of Civilis continued to expand with reinforcements from almost all regions of Germania. They began to devastate the territories of the Morini, Menapii, Ubii and Treveri, which included the entire Rhineland down to the Moselle and across to the North Sea coast. The siege ring around Vetera was further reinforced, and the attempts to storm it resumed. The garrison's loss provided some relief and ended the attempts at conquest. However, a successful breakout was out of the question.

It was around this time that the second battle of Bedriacum in northern Italy between Vespasian and Vitellius was decided in Vespasian's favour. News of this, and of Vespasian's request that Civilis cease fighting, probably reached the Lower Rhine in early November of that year. It was ignored by Civilis, who instead sent some of his troops against Vocula and continued the siege of Vetera. Vocula defeated the troops sent against him and marched on Vetera to relieve it. There, the battle raged back and forth until it was finally decided in favour of the Romans when the fort's garrison fell. Vetera was freed from encirclement, but the supply situation remained precarious, the rebels continued to dominate the surrounding area, and Vocula failed to pursue the defeated Civilis troops. Just as Vocula had withdrawn another 1000 men from the Vetera garrison to secure supplies, Civilis encircled the camp again in late December 69. Vocula retreated to Novaesium, pursued by Civilis, who captured Gelduba and whose cavalry advanced to Novaesium. In the following months, the main events of the war shifted deeper into the south of the Rhineland, where a number of Gaulish peoples, including the Treveri, now joined the Vitellian legions in revolt against Vespasian's rule.

The remaining troops in the legionary camp at Vetera, parts of Legio XV Primigenia, Legio V Alaudae and possibly Legio XVI Gallica, surrendered in March 70, having exhausted their supplies. Vetera was released for plunder; the legionaries were allowed to leave freely after swearing an oath to the "Imperium Galliarum", the Gaulish Empire of Civilis. However, five miles south of Vetera they were ambushed and massacred by Teutons. A few managed to escape back to Vetera, where they perished in the fires set by the rebels as they plundered the city. This is the end of the story of this Claudian-Neronian legionary camp.

In the same year, at the end of July or the beginning of August 70 CE, the Roman troops won one of the decisive battles in the suppression of the Batavi uprising at the "Battle of Vetera", in front of the gates of the destroyed fort.

=== Canabae Legionis, amphitheatre and burial grounds ===
Most Roman legionary camps had a canabae legionis, which was a civilian suburb where soldiers' families, craftsmen, traders, innkeepers, brothel operators, and other service providers settled. It is probable that the canabae existed in Vetera during the first decades of the military presence, although traces of them are missing except for a pottery kiln dating back to the early Claudian period. Reliable traces of a camp suburb, which must have been of considerable size, exist only from the time of the Claudian-Neronian camp, as Tacitus reports. These traces have been confirmed by soundings. The canabae were separated from the camp itself by an undeveloped strip of land 100 metres wide. The eastern boundary of the civilian settlement cannot be determined, as it was eroded by the Rhine. To the south, it is believed that the canabae extended to the start of the burial grounds in the vicinity of the present-day village of Birten. The size and structure of the canabae are not well documented. It is probable that it followed a U-shaped path around the military camp to the west, south, and east. Recent aerial archaeological surveys conducted by archaeologist Baoquan Song reveal a consistent street layout and concentrated development on the eastern side of the garrison.

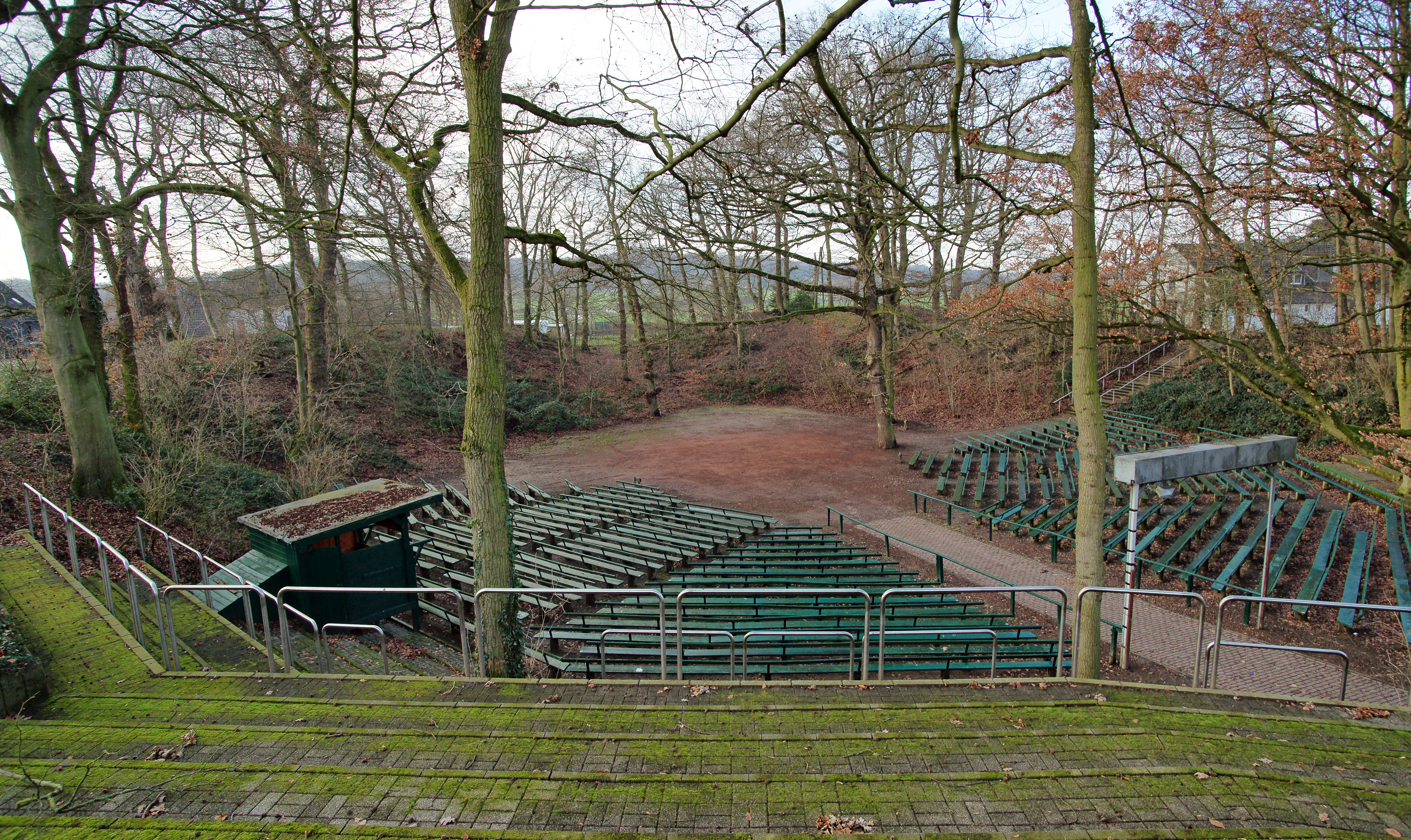
Amphitheatre, now an open-air stage

The amphitheatre, the only remaining relic of Roman Vetera, was constructed during the Claudian-Neronian camp. (Note: At approximately 51°38′15″N 6°28′23″E) Its elliptical ground plan had outer walls measuring 98 metres by 84 metres in ancient times, while the interior dimensions were 47.5 metres by 34.5 metres. During the excavations carried out by Hans Lehner in 1908 and 1909, the rampart was still up to eight metres high and ten metres wide. In ancient times, the amphitheatre had a capacity of up to 10,000 spectators. Its preservation is attributed to the belief, during the Middle Ages, that it was the site of the martyrdom of St Viktor. Currently, the amphitheatre has been reconstructed and is used as an open-air stage once again.

South of the canabae legionis in the area of today's Birten district of Xanten lies a burial ground that served both the garrison and the civilian settlement. Over 60 cremation burials have been discovered to date, with some found during the construction of the Birten parish church (Note: At approximately 51°38′9″N 6°28′34″E) in 1902/1903, and the majority unearthed during the construction of the forest cemetery (Note: Approximately 51°38′6″N 6°28′36″E) in 1960. The graves can be dated to the Augustan to Neronian periods, with only one grave dating to Vespasian's reign. North of Vetera I, between the camp and the southern medieval city limits of Xanten, another burial ground was discovered. (Note: Approximately 51°39′27″N 6°27′37″E) In the wider area, occasional Roman graves were also found.

== Vetera II ==
Vetera II
- Veteribus, Veteris
- Interactive map of Vetera II
- 51°39′5″N 6°29′24″E
- Type: Legionary camp
- Associated with: a) Legio XXII Primigenia b) Legio VI Victrix c) Legio XXX Ulpia Victrix
- Location: Xanten-Bislicher Insel
- Region: Germania Inferior
- Part of: Lower Germanic Limes

History
- Built: 71 CE
- Abandoned: 3rd century CE

Site notes
- Material: Stone
- Area: Unknown
- Condition: non-visible ground monument

=== Features and findings ===
The search for the second Roman fort site, which would eventually be known as Vetera II, proved elusive. Although there were indications in favour of the area around Bislicher Insel, definitive proof was lacking. A project planned in 1935/36 to locate the camp of the XXX Legion failed due to the escalation of political tension in the run-up to the Second World War.

The fort site was ultimately discovered due to the indirect consequences of the War. The post-war housing construction boom created a high demand for building materials, leading to the mining of gravel deposits on Bislicher Insel. In the early 1950s, a significant number of Roman artifacts were discovered, initially without notice. These included small items such as bronzes, coins, and ceramics (the latter filling excavator shovels on some days), as well as building materials like oak beams, bricks, tufa masonry, and lead plates.

In 1954, Wilhelm Piepers discovered the base of a statuette of Genius with an inscription, which had been found the previous year. This discovery prompted archaeologists from Xanten and Bonn to take a closer look at the excavation work. The inscription read:

GENIO SIGNIF(erorum)
LEG(ionis) XXX V(lpia) V(ictrix)
P(ublius) AELIVS SEVE
RINVS T(estamento) P(oni) I(vssit)

Translated: "Publius Aelius Severinus had this statuette erected to the genius of the standard-bearers of the 30th legion, the Ulpian, the victorious." This was a direct reference to the Legio XXX Ulpia Victrix. On the initiative of the Rheinisches Landesmuseum Bonn, divers were used for the first time in the museum's history for archaeological surveys during the excavation of the Bislicher Insel. The first dives were carried out in 1955 under extremely difficult visibility conditions in the murky waters, followed by others in 1957 and 1958. The walls of the sunken legionary camp could be identified under water, sometimes more by touch than by sight.

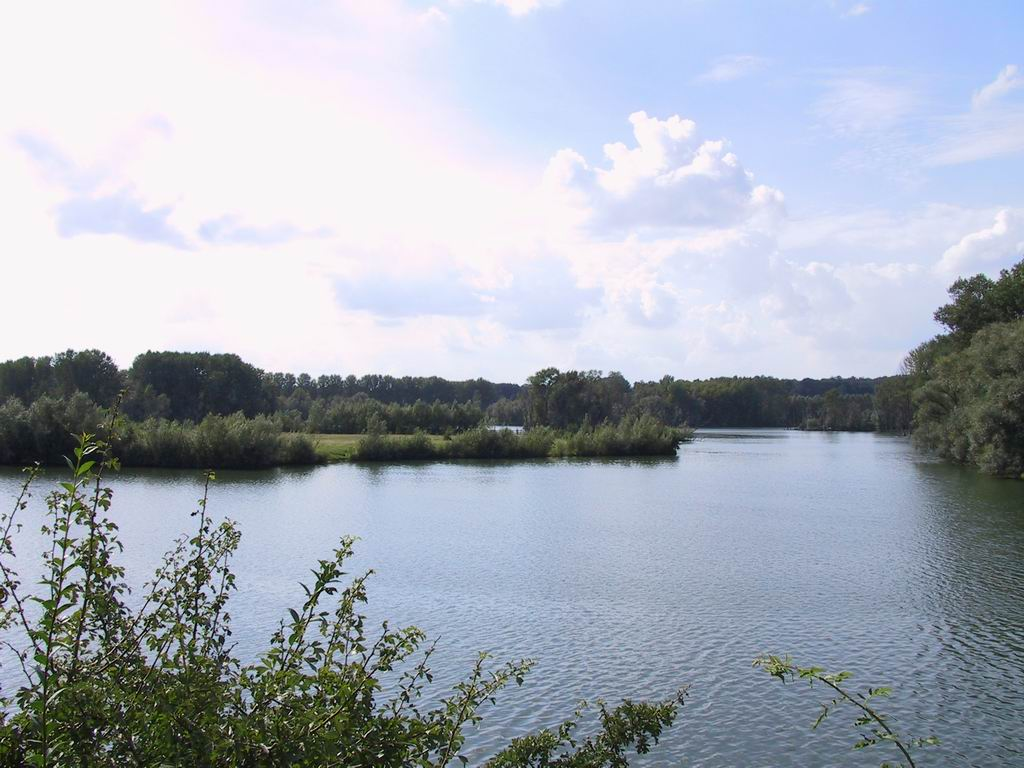
Bislicher Insel; today's situation.

The extensive finds made it possible to determine the troops stationed at Vetera II (brick stamps of the VI, XXII and XXX legions) and the duration of the occupation of the camp. It began immediately after the end of the Revolt of the Batavi and lasted until the second half of the 3rd century. The last datable find was a sestertius of Postumus from 260, which is why for a long time the end of the camp was thought to be linked to a Frankish invasion around 260 or 275. However, it is also possible that the camp continued beyond this date, possibly until the 4th century. Given the relatively small scale of the archaeological investigations at the camp site and the relatively small quantity of finds, the lack of objects from this period is not an argument against it. All other legionary camps on the Rhine and Danube frontiers have since been shown to have survived the Germanic invasions of the 3rd century and to have continued to exist into Late Antiquity. In addition, the 4th-century historian Ammianus Marcellinus mentions a settlement called Tricensimae, probably derived from the Latin ordinal number (tricesima, "the thirtieth") of the legion. This is often identified with a fortified settlement of late antiquity on the site of Colonia Ulpia Traiana (see Tricensimae); however, some researchers suggest that it was the surviving camp of Vetera II. The destruction of the Colonia Ulpia Traiana itself around the year 275, which had been assumed, is now considered unprovable.

Vetera II, like all legionary camps, had a camp suburb known as the Canabae legionis. The approximate extent of the suburb was determined by mapping surface finds and it surrounded the camp to the west and south.

=== Occupation ===
Following the reorganisation of the "Exercitus Germaniae Inferioris" (the Lower Germanic army) after the Batavi Revolt, only one legion, the Legio XXII Primigenia, detached from Mainz, was stationed in Vetera. Instead of maintaining a double legion camp in Vetera, one legion was deployed to the centre of the rebellion area, to Ulpia Noviomagus Batavorum (Nijmegen). The previous camp, which was destroyed during the uprising, was not reconstructed. Instead, it was replaced in 71 by a new single camp located approximately one and a half kilometres further east in the area of what is now known as Bislicher Insel.

During the transition from the first to the second century CE, (Note: According to Gechter between 92 and 96.) the XXII Legion was relocated to Mainz and subsequently replaced by the Legio VI Victrix, as documented in Vetera from 104/105. Later, between 119 and 121/122, the Legio VI Victrix was transferred to Britannia and replaced by the Legio XXX Ulpia Victrix, which can be traced up to the later 3rd century.

== Legionary brickworks ==
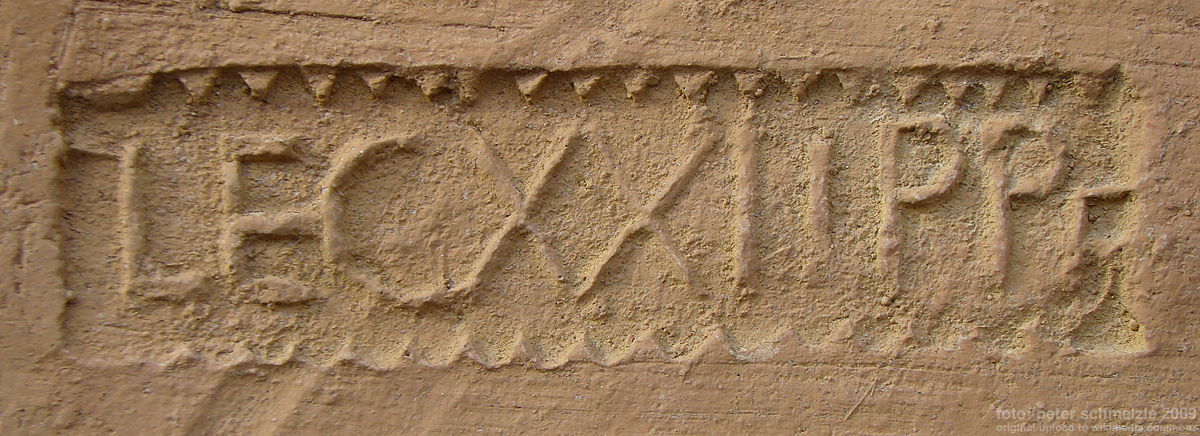
Brick stamp of Legio XXII

Legionaries operated brickworks all over the Rhineland for military and civilian purposes. The Romans used their technological prowess to compensate for the lack of natural stone deposits in the region, utilising the abundant sand and clay deposits. Larger military centres in the Rhineland, including Cologne, Neuss, and Dormagen, had brickworks. Archaeological evidence also suggests a legionary brickworks in the Vetera area. The brickworks was discovered by chance in 1901 on the connecting road between the fort area of Vetera II and Colonia Ulpia Traiana. The kiln uncovered here had been built by the XXII Legion. However, stamped bricks from the XV Legion found on the extensive brickworks site prove that the brickworks must have started earlier. The VI Legion later took over and repaired the kiln, which was then used by the XXX Legion until the 4th century. It alone had a lifespan of 225 years. Alongside the kiln, archaeologists uncovered various production rooms and a drying shed.

Additional excavations were carried out in the vicinity of the brickworks during the 1970s and 1990s, primarily as emergency measures due to construction projects for houses and roads. These excavations revealed two additional brick kilns, a pottery kiln, several sludge basins, and drying and storage sheds. Clay pipes were used to supply the required fresh water, while the process water was discharged into the Rhine via canals. The range of production included roof tiles, hollow bricks, facing bricks, wall tiles, hypocaust slabs and pipes. The bricks have a typical stamping that allows for identification of the legions involved in their production.

== Training camp around Xanten ==
Similar to modern armies, the troops in the Roman army were kept in shape during peacetime through various exercises and training measures, preparing them for possible deployment at any time. This included training in camp construction.

Aerial archaeological surveys have identified over sixty training camps between Xanten and Alpen on both sides of the road connecting Vetera with Asciburgium, which corresponds to today's federal road 57. The ancient military training area covered over ten square kilometres. Most of these training camps were not fully realised camps. The instructors focused solely on training the technically demanding areas of camp construction, specifically the construction of camp corners. Hermann Hinz excavated two of the camps on the Kaninenberg in Winnenthal in 1961/1962. A fully constructed camp on the southern edge of the training area is described as a marching camp where a reinforcement troop must have camped on the way to Vetera. Regrettably, none of the camps can be assigned to a specific construction phase of Vetera as there is no dating material available.

In the Uedemer Hochwald, there are 13 practice marching camps that were erected during manoeuvres between the 1st and 3rd centuries. These camps are still preserved today, with ramparts up to 0.5m high.

== Heritage protection ==
The forts of Vetera are heritage monuments according to the law for the protection and care of monuments in the state of North Rhine-Westphalia. Investigations and the targeted collection of finds are subject to authorisation. Accidental finds must be reported to the monument authorities.

== See also ==
- List of World Heritage Sites in Germany
- Germanic–Roman contacts
- Chronology of warfare between the Romans and Germanic peoples

== Bibliography ==
- Tilmann Bechert: Römisches Germanien zwischen Rhein und Maas. Die Provinz Germania inferior. Hirmer, München 1982, ISBN 3-7774-3440-X (Edition Antike Welt, 4).
- Tilmann Bechert, Willem J. H. Willems: Die römische Reichsgrenze von der Mosel bis zur Nordseeküste. Theiss, Stuttgart 1995, ISBN 978-3-8062-1189-4.
- Werner Böcking: Die Römer am Niederrhein. Geschichte und Ausgrabungen. 5. Auflage, Klartext, Essen 2005, ISBN 3-89861-427-1.
- Julianus Egidius Bogaers, Christoph B. Rüger (eds): Der niedergermanische Limes. Materialien zu seiner Geschichte. Rheinland Verlag, Köln 1974, ISBN 3-7927-0194-4.
- Michael Gechter: Die Anfänge des Niedergermanischen Limes. In: Bonner Jahrbücher 179 (1979), pp. 1–138.
- Michael Gechter: Die Legionslager Vetera I und II. In: Heinz Günter Horn (eds.): Die Römer in Nordrhein-Westfalen. Lizenzausgabe der Auflage von 1987. Nikol, Hamburg 2002, ISBN 3-933203-59-7, pp. 619–625.
- Michael Gechter: Das römische Heer in der Provinz Niedergermanien. In: Heinz Günter Horn (ed.): Die Römer in Nordrhein-Westfalen. Lizenzausgabe der Auflage von 1987. Nikol, Hamburg 2002, ISBN 3-933203-59-7, pp. 110–138.
- Michael Gechter: Die Militärgeschichte am Niederrhein von Caesar bis Tiberius. Eine Skizze. In: Thomas Grünewald, Sandra Seibel (eds.): Kontinuität und Diskontinuität. Die Germania Inferior am Beginn und am Ende der römischen Herrschaft, Beiträge des deutsch-niederländischen Kolloquiums in der Katholieke Universiteit Nijmegen, 27. bis 30. Juni 2001 (= Reallexikon der Germanischen Altertumskunde. Ergänzungsband 35). de Gruyter, Berlin 2003, pp. 147–159.
- Michael Gechter: Early Roman military installations and Ubian settlements in the Lower Rhine. In: T. Blagg, M. Millett (eds.): The early Roman empire in the West. 2. ed. Oxford Books 2002, ISBN 1-84217-069-4, pp. 97–102.
- Norbert Hanel: Zum antiken Namen der Legionslager auf dem Fürstenberg bei Xanten: Vetera castra. In: Xantener Berichte. Band 5, Rheinland Verlag, Köln 1994, ISBN 3-7927-1415-9, pp. 263–265 (PDF).
- Norbert Hanel: Vetera I. Die Funde aus den römischen Lagern auf dem Fürstenberg bei Xanten. (= Rheinische Ausgrabungen. 35). Rheinland-Verlag, Köln 1995; Habelt, Bonn 1995, ISBN 3-7927-1248-2.
- Norbert Hanel: Die Militärlager von Vetera I und ihre Lagersiedlungen. In: Martin Müller, Hans-Joachim Schalles, Norbert Zieling (eds.): Colonia Ulpia Traiana. Xanten und sein Umland in römischer Zeit. Zabern, Mainz 2008, ISBN 978-3-8053-3953-7, pp. 93–107.
- Hermann Hinz: Xanten zur Römerzeit. Th. Gesthuysen, Xanten 1960, W. Renckhoff, Duisburg-Ruhrort 1963, Th. Gesthuysen, Xanten 1967, Dombuchhandlung, Xanten 1971, 1973, 1976 (6. ed).
- Hermann Hinz: Ein frührömisches Gräberfeld auf dem Kirchhügel in Birten, Kreis Moers. In: Rheinische Ausgrabungen. 12. Rheinland-Verlag, Bonn 1973, pp. 24–83.
- Hans Lehner: Vetera bei Xanten. Schwann, Düsseldorf 1936
- Hans Lehner: Vetera. Die Ergebnisse der Ausgrabungen des Bonner Provinzialmuseums bis 1929. De Gruyter, Berlin/Leipzig 1930 (Digitalisation).
- Hans Lehner: Das Römerlager Vetera bei Xanten. Ein Führer durch die Ausgrabungen des Bonner Provinzialmuseums. Röhrscheid, Bonn 1926.
- Philipp Houben: Denkmaeler von Castra Vetera und Colonia Traiana in Ph. Houben’s Antiquarium zu Xanten. Xanten/Wesel 1839.
- Jürgen Kunow: Die Militärgeschichte Niedergermaniens. In: Heinz Günter Horn (ed.): Die Römer in Nordrhein-Westfalen. Lizenzausgabe der Auflage von 1987. Nikol, Hamburg 2002, ISBN 3-933203-59-7, pp. 27–109.
- Julia Obladen-Kauder: Spurensuche in Xanten. Ein archäologischer Wanderführer. Rheinischer Verein für Denkmalpflege und Landschaftsschutz, Köln 2005, ISBN 3-88094-927-1.
- Harald von Petrikovits: Die Legionsfestung Vetera II. In: Bonner Jahrbücher. 159, 1959, pp. 89–133.
- Harald von Petrikovits: Fortifications in the North-Western Roman Empire from the Third to the Fifth Centuries A. D. In: The Journal of Roman Studies. 61, 1971, pp. 178–218.
- Harald von Petrikovits: Vetera. In: Paulys Realencyclopädie der classischen Altertumswissenschaft (RE). Band VIII A,2, Stuttgart 1958, pp. 1801–1834.
- Christoph B. Rüger: Alpen. Römisches Übungs- und Marschlager. In: Heinz Günter Horn (eds.): Die Römer in Nordrhein-Westfalen. Lizenzausgabe der Auflage von 1987. Nikol, Hamburg 2002, ISBN 3-933203-59-7, pp. 332–334.
- Dirk Schmitz: Das Lager Vetera II und seine Legionen. In: Martin Müller, Hans-Joachim Schalles, Norbert Zieling (eds.): Colonia Ulpia Traiana. Xanten und sein Umland in römischer Zeit. Zabern, Mainz 2008, ISBN 978-3-8053-3953-7, pp. 141–170.
- Dirk Schmitz: Der Bataveraufstand im Kontext des römischen Bürgerkrieges 68–70 n. Chr. In: Martin Müller, Hans-Joachim Schalles, Norbert Zieling (eds.): Colonia Ulpia Traiana. Xanten und sein Umland in römischer Zeit. Zabern, Mainz 2008, ISBN 978-3-8053-3953-7, pp. 117–140
- Hans Schönberger: The Roman Frontier in Germany. An Archaeological Survey. In: The Journal of Roman Studies. v 59, 1969, pp. 144–197.
- Hans Schönberger: Die römischen Truppenlager der frühen und mittleren Kaiserzeit zwischen Nordsee und Inn. In: Bericht der Römisch-Germanischen Kommission. 66, 1985, pp. 321–495.
