= Hagen (surname) =

Hagen is a surname. Notable people with the surname include:

== A ==
- Aksel Hagen (born 1953), Norwegian politician
- Alexander Hagen (born 1955), German sailor
- Alice Mary Hagen (1872–1972), Canadian ceramic artist
- Anders Hagen (1921–2005), Norwegian archaeologist
- Andreas Hagen (footballer) (born 1986), Norwegian footballer and manager
- Anita Hagen (1931–2015), Canadian politician

== B ==
- Bernhard Joachim Hagen (1720–1787), German composer, violinist and lutenist
- Bruce Hagen (1930–2025), American politician

== C ==
- Carl I. Hagen (born 1944), Norwegian politician, former leader of the Progress Party and vice-president of Stortinget
- Cecilia Hagen (born 1946), Swedish journalist and writer
- Cosma Shiva Hagen (born 1981), German actress
- C. R. Hagen (born 1937), American physicist at the University of Rochester

== D ==
- Daniel Hagen (born 1956), American voice, television, and film actor
- Daron Hagen (born 1961), American composer
- David Hagen (1973–2020), Scottish footballer
- David Warner Hagen (1931–2022), American jurist

== E ==
- Earle Hagen (1919–2008), American composer
- Edvald Boasson Hagen (born 1987), Norwegian cyclist
- Edward Hagen (anthropologist) (born 1962), American biological anthropologist and professor
- Edward Hagen (handballer) (1908–1963), American handball player
- Edward Hagen (Minnesota politician) (1875–1950), American farmer, educator and politician
- Eli Hagen (born 1947), wife and secretary of the Norwegian politician Carl I. Hagen
- Else Hagen (1914–2010), Norwegian visual artist
- Ellen Hagen (1873–1967), Swedish suffragette, women's rights activist and politician
- Erik Hagen (born 1975), footballer who played for FC Zenit Saint Petersburg
- Ernst August Hagen (1797–1880) Prussian writer on art and novelist
- Ernst Bessel Hagen (1851–1923), German physicist
- Eva-Maria Hagen (1934–2022), German actress and singer
- Even Aleksander Hagen (born 1988), Norwegian politician

== G ==
- Georgina Hagen (born 1991), English actress
- Gottfried Hagen (1230–1299), German town clerk
- Gotthilf Hagen (1797–1884), German physicist and hydraulic engineer
- Gulbrand Hagen (1864–1919), American newspaper editor, writer and photographer

== H ==
- Halvor Hagen (born 1947), American football player
- Hans Hagen (born 1953), professor of computer science at the University of Kaiserslautern
- Harald Hagen (1902–1970), Norwegian sailor
- Harlan Hagen (1914–1990), American politician
- Harold Hagen (1901–1957), American politician
- Hermann August Hagen (1817–1893), German entomologist
- Horst Hagen (born 1950), German volleyball player

== I ==
- I. Kathleen Hagen (1945–2015), former medical doctor who gained notoriety for being accused of murder by asphyxia of her parents
- Ingeborg Refling Hagen (1895–1989), Norwegian author and teacher
- Ingebrigt Severin Hagen (1852–1917), Norwegian bryologist

== J ==
- Jacob Hagen (1809–1870), businessman and parliamentarian in South Australia
- Jean Hagen (1923–1977), American actress
- Jens Andersen Hagen (1832–1906), Norwegian politician
- Jimmy Hagan (1918–1998), English football player and manager
- Johann Georg Hagen (1847–1930), American astronomer and Catholic priest
- John Hagen (born 1956), Canadian surgeon
- Julia Hagen (born 1995), Austrian cellist
- Julius Hagen (1884–1940), German film producer

== K ==
- Karen Grønn-Hagen (1903–1982), Norwegian politician
- Kenneth Sverre Hagen (1919–1997), American entomologist
- Kevin Hagen (1928–2005), American actor

== L ==
- Loren D. Hagen (1946–1971), United States Army Special Forces officer awarded the Medal of Honor

== M ==
- Magne Hagen (born 1938), Norwegian royal servant
- Mark Rein-Hagen (born 1964), role-playing, card, video and board game designer
- Mark von Hagen (1954–2019), professor for Russian, Ukrainian, and Eurasian history at Arizona State University
- Morten Hagen (born 1974), Norwegian golfer

== N ==
- Natascha Hagen, Austrian singer-songwriter
- Nicholas Hagen (born 1996), Guatemalan footballer
- Nina Hagen (born 1955), German female singer

== O ==
- Oddbjørn Hagen (1908–1983), Norwegian skier
- Olav Hagen (1921–2013), Norwegian cross country skier
- Orville W. Hagen (1915–2007), American politician
- Oskar Hagen (1888–1957), German art historian
- Oscar W. Hagen (1884–1945), American politician

== P ==
- Paul Hagen (1920–2003), Danish film actor
- Petter Hagen (born 1969), Norwegian footballer

== R ==
- Rune Hagen (born 1975), Norwegian footballer

== S ==
- Sam Hagen (born 2003), American football player
- Silvia Hagen, author
- Stan Hagen (1940–2009), Canadian politician
- Steffen Hagen (born 1986), Norwegian footballer
- Stein Erik Hagen (1956–2026), Norwegian businessman
- Steve Hagen (born 1945), founder of the Dharma Field Zen Center
- Steven van der Hagen (1563–1621), first admiral of the Dutch East India Company

== T ==
- Theodor Hagen (music critic) (1823–1871), German-American writer on musical topics
- Theodor Hagen (artist) (1842–1919), German landscape painter
- Thoralf Hagen (1887–1979), Norwegian rower
- Tom Hagen (businessman) (born 1950), Norwegian businessman
- Tom Harald Hagen (born 1978), Norwegian footballer
- Toni Hagen (1917–2003), Swiss geologist and development assistance pioneer in Nepal
- Tord Hagen (1914–2008), Swedish diplomat

== U ==
- Ulrich Hagen (1925–2007), German scientist
- Uta Hagen (1919–2004), American stage actress

== V ==
- Veronika Hagen (born 1963), Austrian violist
- Victor Wolfgang von Hagen (1908–1985), American explorer

== W ==
- Walter Hagen (1892–1969), American Golfer
- Walter Hagen (aviator) (1897–1963), German Luftwaffe Stuka pilot
- William W. Hagen (born 1942), Professor of History at the University of California-Davis

== Y ==
- Yngvar Hagen (1909–1993), Norwegian zoologist

== See also ==
- Hagens, a surname
- Hagan (surname)
- Hegen (surname)
- Van der Hagen, a surname
- Von Hagen, a surname
