= Edward Hagen =

Edward Hagen is the name of:

- Edward Hagen (anthropologist) (born 1962), American biological anthropologist and professor
- Edward Hagen (handballer) (1908–1963), American handball player
- Edward Hagen (Minnesota politician) (1875–1950), American farmer, educator and politician
