= Xanten Archeology Park =

Archeology park in North Rhine-Westphalia, Germany

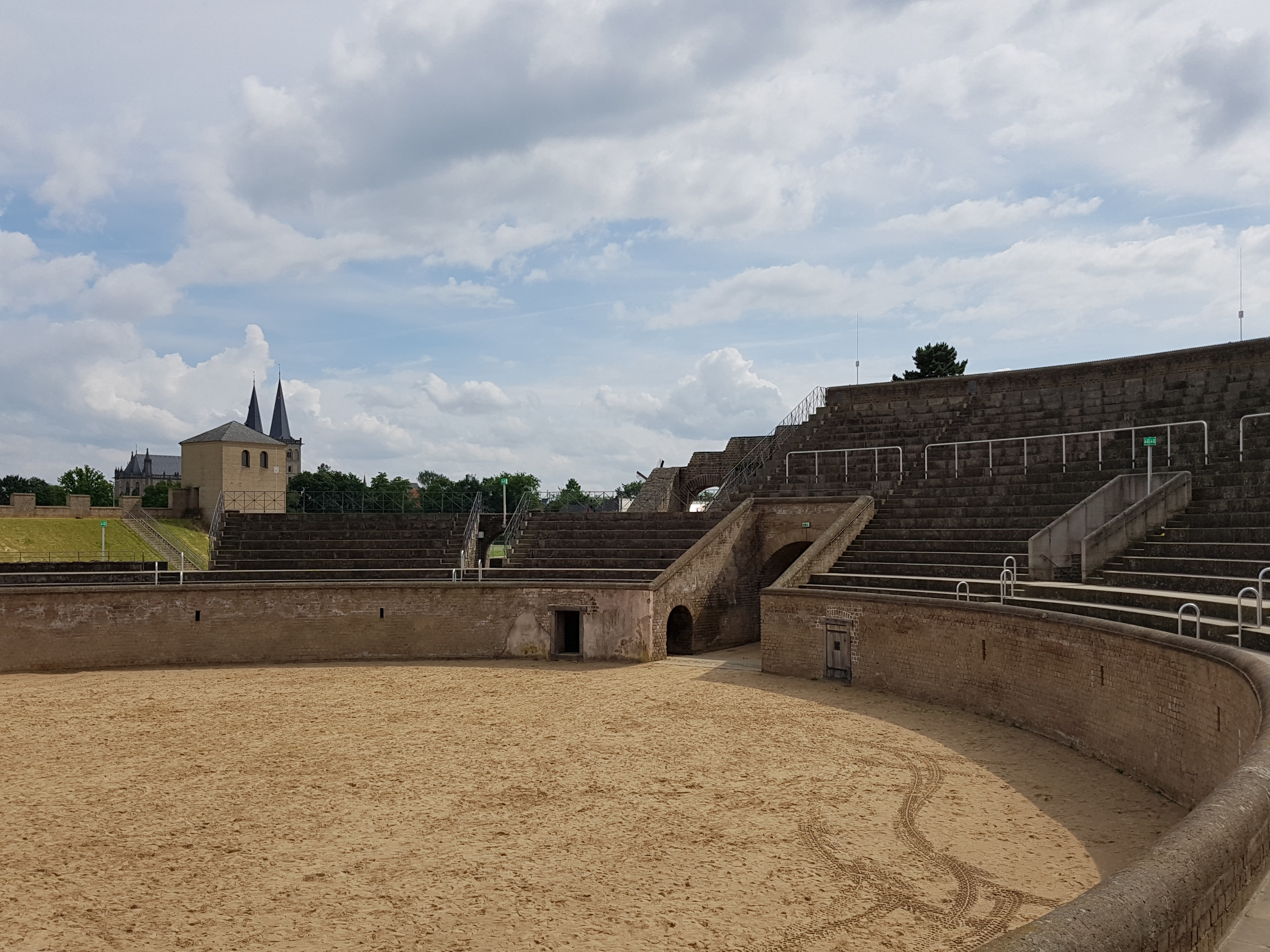
A replica of the amphitheater built in the eastern corner of the park in the 1970s. In the background, the towers of St. Victor's Cathedral in the center of Xanten are visible.

The Xanten Archeology Park (German: Archäologischer Park Xanten) is an open-air museum near Xanten, Germany, established by the Landschaftsverband Rheinland (Rheinland Regional Association) in 1973. Since its opening in 1977, the park has been repeatedly expanded.

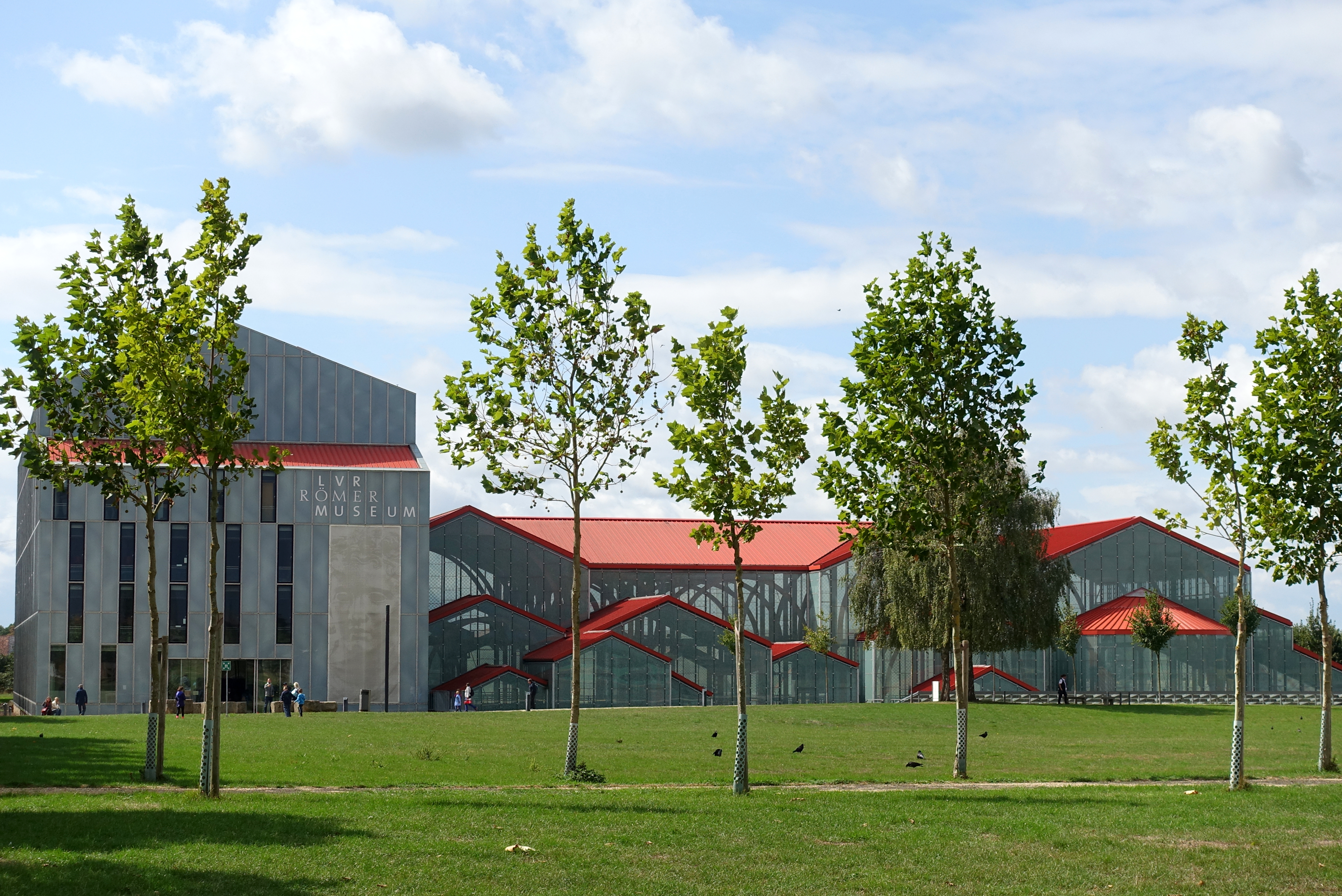
The park's Roman Museum (left) and a protective structure covering the remains of the Roman baths (right)

The park encompasses the former Roman city Colonia Ulpia Traiana, one of the most significant Roman settlements in Germany. Ongoing excavations are conducted in the park to document and study the archaeological remains. To this end, a "Summer Academy" was established, offering students the opportunity to gain practical experience in archaeological work.

To give park visitors an impression of what the Colonia looked like, several Roman buildings and their interiors have been reconstructed or recreated. These include sections of the city wall, a harbor temple, an inn, and the city's amphitheater. The Colonia was built according to a planned grid layout, a pattern reflected in the park's paths and avenues.

For many years, the Xanten Regional Museum was located in Xanten's town center. It was eventually integrated into a protective building that houses the Roman baths and was renamed the LVR-RömerMuseum Xanten in 2008. Exhibits related to local and regional Roman history are on display.

== History ==
Colonia Ulpia Traiana covered an area of approximately 180 acres (73 ha), had a population of around 10,000, and was one of the key cities in the Roman province of Germania Inferior. The city's harbor—which has not yet been excavated—was located on the eastern side of the town along a branch of the Rhine that has since silted up. The city was supplied with fresh water by groundwater wells, rainwater collection basins, and an aqueduct, while wastewater was channeled into the Rhine through an underground sewer system. In addition to the harbor, the city featured covered sidewalks, a harbor temple, a Capitoline Triad temple, a temple dedicated to the Matronae, a forum, an amphitheater, and a large bath complex. In the late 3rd or early 4th century, a heavily fortified stronghold was constructed in the city center; being smaller in size, it was easier to defend and maintain. Based on written sources from Late Antiquity, this fortress was called Tricensimae, though this identification remains a subject of scholarly debate. At the beginning of the 5th century, raids by Germanic tribes intensified to such an extent that the settlement was permanently abandoned.

The ruins of the Roman city initially served as a quarry for the construction of the medieval town of Xanten, and the areas gradually cleared of ruins were eventually converted into farmland. Interest in Roman history emerged around the second half of the 16th century, and systematic excavations of the site were conducted in the 19th century by the Niederrheinischer Altertumsverein (Lower Rhine Antiquarian Society), uncovering sections of the city fortifications and a temple, as well as 1,500 graves. The first traces of the amphitheater were discovered in 1887, when a farmer’s plow caught on buried remains.

In 1930, while Federal Highway 57 near Xanten was being constructed, the Rheinisches Landesmuseum Bonn (Rhineland State Museum in Bonn) conducted emergency excavations along the route. Major systematic excavations began in 1934, leading to the discovery of a silted-up branch of the Rhine east of the Roman town, as well as the complete uncovering, conservation, and opening of the amphitheater to the public.

The first excavations following World War II took place in 1957, as the city planned to establish a concrete industrial plant on parts of the Colonia site that had previously been used for agriculture. During these excavations, the Roman baths, the artisan and commercial district, several streets, and a building complex of unknown function were uncovered and documented. The remains were then partially removed and built over.

Around 1970, plans were made to extract gravel from the old branch of the Rhine located next to the former Roman city and build recreational facilities around the resulting body of water and the amphitheater. This would have destroyed the previously untouched eastern section of the city, including the harbor. The idea was abandoned, and the city of Xanten decided against expanding the existing industrial zone situated between the town, Highway 57, and the Rhine, opting instead to relocate the existing businesses, freeing up the land for the construction of the archeological park.

=== Founding and development of the park ===
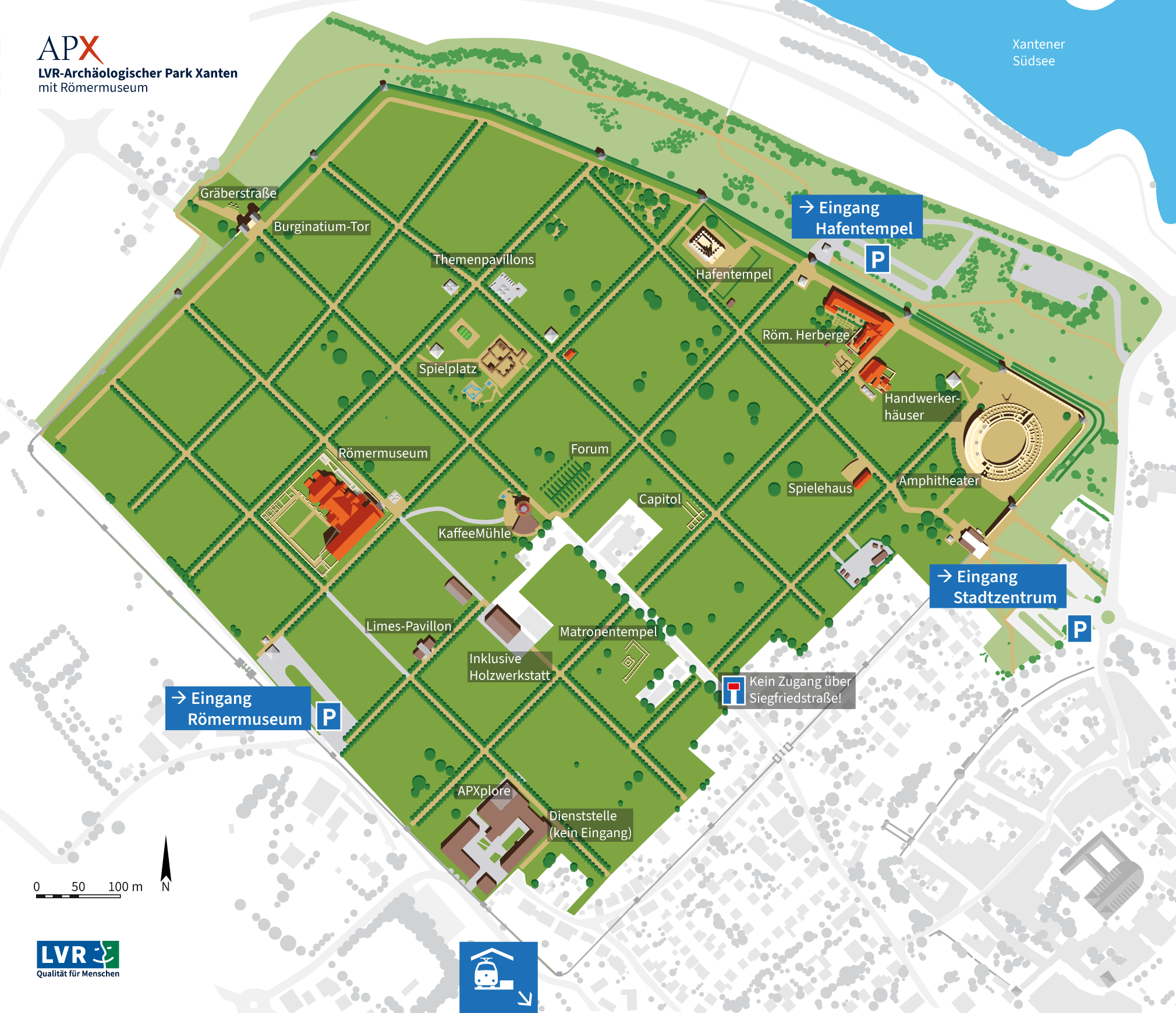
Map of the park as of 2025

On 14 September 1973, the regional committee of the Landschaftsverband Rheinland (LVR) established the park on the site of the former Colonia; the LVR was appointed as the operating authority the following month. Development of the park began shortly after near the amphitheater, while the remaining areas continued to be used for agriculture until 1974. The northeastern section of the park, covering 15 acres (6 ha) hectares, finally opened on 8 June 1977 after four years of work.

Hosting the 1980 Landesgartenschau (State Garden Show) had been a subject of heated debate, as there were fears that the event might damage the underground remains of the Colonia. Once these concerns had been dispelled, the show took place from 4–17 June 1980 with the motto "The utility and ornamental value of plants over two millennia." Coinciding with the opening of the show, the park was expanded from 15 acres (6 ha) to 67 acres (27 ha), thereby covering the entire eastern section of the city. Many of the gardens were removed after the event concluded; only a rock garden and playground remained. The playground was renovated in 2003. Until 2002, the archaeological park was directed by park founder and architectural researcher Gundolf Precht.

After industrial facilities located on the site of the Roman baths were relocated, its ruins were finally uncovered. In 1999 they were enclosed by a glass protective structure that replicated the dimensions of the building, with the exception of the basilica. For many years, this structure functioned as a standalone museum, as it was separated from the rest of the park by Highway 57. This isolation ended in 2008 with the relocation of the regional museum into a newly constructed building over the basilica ruins, thereby integrating the baths into the facility now known as the Roman Museum.

With the opening of the final section of the northwest bypass on 21 December 2008, Highway 57 no longer bisected the Roman city. The ceremonial expansion of the park into the area that had previously been cut off took place on 15 May 2009, bringing the park’s total area to 150 acres (60 ha).

The actual dismantling of the roads within the park began in 2011 with the removal of Orwatersweg—the link between Trajanstraße and Trajanring near the Roman baths. This was followed in subsequent years by sections of Trajanstraße between the administration building and Siegfriedstraße, Siegfriedstraße between Trajanstraße and the old Highway 57, and the old Highway 57 itself. In 2011 and 2012, 450 linden trees were planted; these trace the ancient city's roads within the park, visually and structurally linking the new site to the original.

In November 2013, construction began on a new visitor center to serve as the city center entrance at the site of the former southern side entrance, located by the ancient city wall near the amphitheater. Following its completion in early 2015, the main entrance was relocated here from the side of the park facing away from the town in order to better connect the park to Xanten’s town center. The previous side entrance near the museum and the entrance at the harbor gate remain in use. A new parking lot was created in front of the city center entrance on the site of a gas station that had been demolished in the summer of 2014.

In April 2019, a new entrance on Trajanstraße opened, offering parking for buses, cars, and bicycles, as well as closer access to Bahnhof Xanten (Xanten train station).

== Structures ==
The aim of the park is to make Colonia Ulpia Traiana visible once again. To this end, the Roman insulae have been planted with grass, the Roman street network marked with gravel, and trees planted at intervals corresponding to the pillars of the sidewalk canopies. Several buildings and sections of the city wall have been reconstructed, and foundations of excavated buildings have been roofed over and opened to visitors. An overview of the structures can be found in the table below.

| Structure | Type | Site | Use | Notes |
| Amphitheater der Colonia Ulpia Traiana | Roman; partial reconstruction | Insula 40 (51.667193°N 6.451305°E) | Events | The amphitheater was not reconstructed on its original foundations, as these had been excavated after their discovery in 1887 and were consequently exposed to the elements, meaning their load-bearing capacity could no longer be guaranteed. Three of the original pier foundations are on display next to the arena today. A replica of a Roman construction crane is also located between the arena and the city wall. |
| Stadtmauer der Colonia Ulpia Traiana | Roman; partial reconstruction | Near Insula 40 (51.667433°N 6.452813°E) | Walkable section of the city wall | This is the only reconstructed section of the city wall to date. The path of the remaining parts in the old section of the park are marked by beechwood hedges, with reconstructed towers. |
| Reconstructed tower (Mole gate) | Roman; partial reconstruction | Near Insula 37 and 38 (51.669143°N 6.448157°E) | Accessible tower, former main entrance of the park (the ticket office is located in a pavilion in front of it) | The Roman name of the gate is unknown; the modern designation refers to the mole of the Roman harbor that lied outside of it. The gate likely had a gate passage. |
| Reconstructed east tower (Harbor gate) | Roman; partial reconstruction | Near Insula 36 and 37 (51.669855°N 6.446236°E) | Accessible tower | The Roman name of the gate is unknown; and the modern designation refers to the harbor that lied outside it. Originally, it was believed to be a regular tower. Its use as a gate is was determined by wear marks on the base. |
| Reconstructed northern main gate (Burginatium gate) | Roman; partial reconstruction | Near Insula 15 and 22 (51.669619°N 6.438240°E) | Accessible gates | The Roman name of the gate is unknown; the modern designation refers to the nearest castle, Burginatium (Altkalkar) |
| Reconstructed Römische Herberge (Roman Inn) | Roman; complete reconstruction | Insula 38 (51.668582°N 6.449031°E) | Only partially accessible | Exhibition area in the former school, restaurant on the ground floor of the inn, rooms for Roman-style festivities |
| Reconstructed Thermen der Colonia Ulpia Traiana (Roman baths at the inn) | Roman; complete reconstruction | Insula 38 (51.668341°N 6.449077°E) | Only partially accessible | The Roman name of the thermal springs is unknown; the modern designation refers to the nearby inn to which the thermal springs belonged. |
| Reconstructed Hafentempel (Harbor temple) | Roman; partial reconstruction (1980) | Insula 37 (51.669358°N 6.446258°E) | Partially accessible reconstruction of the Cella and foundation | The Roman name of the temple is unknown; the modern designation refers to the nearby former harbor. The temple substructure serves as a protective building for the excavated foundation plate beneath it. |
| Floor plans of a house with a Roman grain mill (front) and a Roman oven (back) | Other | Insula 32 (51.668017°N 6.444756°E) | Oven and grain mill for demonstrations | Hedges mark the floor plans of typical Roman townhouses |
| Part of an aqueduct and milestone Part of an aqueduct | Roman; original construction without protection | Insula 34 (51.666874°N 6.448822°E) | Outdoor objects for viewing | Next to the amusement park; a building where one can play various typical Roman games. There are several original Roman objects, including part of an aqueduct, a milestone and various Roman gravestones. |
| Sewage canal | Roman; original construction without protection | Found in different areas of the park | Outdoor objects for viewing | The canal under the Burginatium gate is accessible, the other canals can be viewed from above through holes in the street. |
| LVR-RömerMuseum mit Thermenschutzbau (Roman museum and baths) | Roman; original construction and protective structures (1999 und 2008) | Insula 10 (51.666581°N 6.439764°E) | Exhibition room in the protective structure over the Roman baths | The Roman Museum built on the basilica's foundation and the protective structure over the baths form a museum ensemble |
| Matronentempel (Xanten) (Matron temple) | Roman; original construction without protection | Insula 20 (51.664851°N 6.445016°E) | Uncovered foundations for outdoor viewing | The Temple District was located in the expanded park in 2008 |
| Roman houses | Roman; complete reconstruction (2015) | Insula 39 (51.667950°N 6.449122°E) | Reconstruction of two Roman craftsman houses | The houses and interior furnishings were faithfully reconstructed based on the clay foundations and found objects. To protect the original foundations, a concrete slab was cast over them. They were officially opened on 30 April 30, 2015. |
| City center entrance | Modern construction (2015) | Near Insula 35 and 40 (51.665963°N 6.451190°E) | 120 m^{2} (1,300 sq ft) space for cashier and gift shop | Construction began in November 2013 and opened on 18 March 2015. |

== Events ==
Arena-Theater GmbH hosted the annual Xantener Sommerfestspiele (Xantener Summer Festival) on outdoor stages in the amphitheater and at the former Roman Legion barracks at Vetera in the Xantener district of Birten. These festivals are characterized by musicals and operas and usually took place from June to August.

With the success of the summer festivals, the park amphitheater established itself as a venue for concerts, musicals, and other events, some with nationwide broadcasting. In June 1984, two concerts by the group BAP were broadcast and on 19 June 1991, the first open-air special broadcast of Wetten, dass..? was broadcast on ZDF. In July 2012, ARD used the amphitheater as a backdrop for the Roman festival Brot und Spiele (Bread and Circuses). Bands such as Die Ärzte, ZZ Top and Fury in the Slaughterhouse gave several concerts in the amphitheater.

Since 1998, the LVR has held the annual "Tag der Begegnung" (Day of Encounter), which has attracted over 20,000 people to the park.

Since 1989, the park has hosted the "International Xanten Archaeological Summer Academy", an excavation training for 30 students.

Every two to three years, the park opens its gates for the Roman festival "Swords, Bread, and Games", with 500 participants from various European countries. After a pause that began with the COVID-19 pandemic, the festival returned to Xanten on 13–14 June 2026, with the "Limesfest".

== Roman museum ==
Spherical panorama of the interior of the Roman baths (view as a 360° interactive panorama)

The Roman museum is the successor to the Xanten Regional Museum, which until 2007 was located in the Xanten city center near the Xanten Cathedral. It was constructed on the foundations of the Roman baths' basilica. A protective structure was built over the baths in 1999, and can be accessed through the museum.

The purpose of the building is to present Roman archeology finds as close as possible to their location. Designed by architects Gatermann + Schossig, construction began in September 2005 and the museum opened on August 16, 2008. The exhibition was designed by Atelier Brückner.

Among the museum's exhibits are not only various objects excavated in the park but also the foundations of the thermal baths themselves, as well as the so-called Batimodus gravestone. In addition to the permanent exhibition about the Colonia, special exhibitions are also shown. For example, the Marcus Caelius—Death in the Varus Battle exhibition, dedicated to officer Marcus Caelius, who died 2000 years ago in the Varus Disaster, and his Cenotaph, the Caelius stone, which was found in Xanten, was held from 24 April 24 to 30 August, 2009. In 2012, an exhibition "Carpe diem" was held, with photographs by Axel Thünker.

Hans-Joachim Schalles was the first science advisor and head of the Roman museum. He was succeeded by Marcus Reuter as interim director in July 2010 and as permanent director in July 2011. Charlotte Schreiter was director from 2012 to 2016. Since 2019, Christoph Eger has been the museum director.

From 27 July 27 to 25 November 2018, a special exhibition entitled "Trade, Logistics and Transport: Routes of Goods/Flows of Goods on the Roman Lower Rhein" was held at the museum.

== See also ==
- Liste der Insulae und Bauten in der Colonia Ulpia Traiana (List of Insulae and buildings at Colonia Ulpia Traiana)

== Bibliography ==
- Gundolf Precht: Von der Colonia Ulpia Traiana zum Archäologischen Park Xanten. In: Stadt Xanten (Hrsg.): Studien zur Geschichte der Stadt Xanten 1278–1978, Festschrift zum 750jährigen Stadtjubiläum. 2. unveränderte Auflage. Rheinland-Verlag, Köln 1983, ISBN 3-7927-0749-7, S. 223–228.
- Alice Willmitzer: Die Grabung 80/26 zwischen Insulae 15 und 22 der Colonia Ulpia Traiana. (= Xantener Berichte, Band 31, Hrsg.: Martin Müller), Verlag Philipp Zabern, Mainz 2017, ISBN 978-3-8053-5135-5.
- Martin Müller, Hans-Joachim Schalles, Norbert Zieling (Hrsg.): Colonia Ulpia Traiana. Xanten und sein Umland in römischer Zeit. Zabern, Mainz 2008, ISBN 978-3-8053-3953-7.
