= Buus (surname) =

Buus is a surname. Notable people with the surname include:

- Eva Louise Buus (born 1979), Danish artist
- Jacob Buus (born 1997), Danish footballer
- Jacques Buus (c. 1500–1565), Franco-Flemish composer and organist
- Bastian Buus (born 2003), Danish racing driver

== See also ==
- Buus
