= Forsberg =

Forsberg is a Swedish-language surname.

== Geographical distribution ==
As of 2014, 62.5% of all known bearers of the surname Forsberg were residents of Sweden (frequency 1:590), 22.5% of the United States (1:60,128), 3.8% of Norway (1:5,096), 3.7% of Finland (1:5,547), 2.7% of Canada (1:50,339) and 2.1% of Denmark (1:10,062).

In Sweden, the frequency of the surname was higher than national average (1:590) in the following counties:

1. Västernorrland (1:202)
2. Västerbotten (1:226)
3. Norrbotten (1:304)
4. Gävleborg (1:329)
5. Jämtland (1:376)
6. Uppsala (1:392)
7. Dalarna (1:422)
8. Västmanland (1:459)
9. Örebro (1:483)
10. Värmland (1:523)

In Norway, the frequency of the surname was higher than national average (1:5,096) in the following regions:

1. Svalbard and Jan Mayen (1:2,214)
2. Eastern Norway (1:3,658)
3. Northern Norway (1:5,053)

In Finland, the frequency of the surname was higher than national average (1:1:5,547) in the following regions:

1. Ostrobothnia (1:2,317)
2. Åland (1:2,484)
3. Central Ostrobothnia (1:2,572)
4. Uusimaa (1:3,095)
5. Kainuu (1:4,779)
6. Kymenlaakso (1:4,883)
7. Päijänne Tavastia (1:5,415)

== People ==
- Amanda Forsberg (1846–?), Swedish ballerina
- Anton Forsberg (born 1992), Swedish ice hockey player
- Bengt Forsberg (born 1952), Swedish classical pianist
- Billy Forsberg (born 1988), British speedway rider
- Carl Johan Forsberg (1868–1938), Swedish painter
- Chris Forsberg (born 1982), American racecar driver
- Chuck Forsberg (1944–2015), American computer specialist
- Emelie Forsberg (born 1986), Swedish trail runner and ski mountaineer
- Emil Forsberg (born 1991), Swedish footballer
- Eric Forsberg (born 1966), American screenwriter and director
- Filip Forsberg (born 1994), Swedish ice hockey player
- Franklin S. Forsberg (1905–2002), American publisher and U.S. ambassador to Sweden
- Henrik Forsberg (born 1967), Swedish cross-country skier and biathlete
- Josephine Forsberg (1921–2011), American writer and pioneer in improvisation at The Second City
- Kevin Forsberg (born 1934), American systems engineer
- Lars Lennart Forsberg (1933–2012), Swedish film director
- Linda Forsberg (born 1985), Swedish footballer
- Liselotte Forsberg (born 1972), Swedish politician
- Magdalena Forsberg (born 1967), Swedish athlete
- Maria Forsberg (born 1974), Swedish politician
- Michael Forsberg, American photographer
- Peter Forsberg (born 1973), Swedish ice hockey player
- Randall Forsberg (1943–2007), Gandhi Peace Award recipient
- Rolf Forsberg (1925–2017), American actor, writer and filmmaker
- Sara Forsberg (born 1994), Finnish singer, comedian, actress, and YouTube personality
- Thomas Forsberg (1966–2004), Swedish musician, known as Quorthon
