= Dorothe Ingenfeld =

German operatic mezzo-soprano

Dorothe Ingenfeld (born 1974) is a German operatic mezzo-soprano.

== Life ==
Born in Xanten in 1974, Ingenfeld completed her vocal training from 1994 onwards at the Hochschule für Musik Hanns Eisler Berlin after her Abitur at Städtisches Stiftsgymnasium Xanten, where she took part in performances of the Hanns Eisler Ensemble and the Ars Nova Ensemble, and from 1997 at the Guildhall School of Music and Drama in London, where she graduated with distinction in 2000 with Rudolf Piernay and Annette Thompson.

Further studies followed with Dietrich Fischer-Dieskau, Paul Hamburger and Emma Kirkby. In 2001, Ingenfeld won a prize at the International Competition for Young Opera Singers of the Kammeroper Schloss Rheinsberg and performed increasingly as a concert, Lied and opera singer, especially of Johann Sebastian Bach's compositions, for example with the Berliner Philharmoniker in Konzerthaus Berlin.

Ingenfeld made her operatic debut with the performance of Cherubino at the Royaumont Foundation, followed by performances as Orfeo (Orfeo ed Euridice) and Orlowsky (Die Fledermaus), among others, as well as further engagements at Theater Hagen, Theatre of West Pomerania and Staatstheater Braunschweig.

In addition to further concert tours and opera performances in England, France and Austria, Ingenfeld gave guest performances in Qatar, where she took part in the world premiere of the opera Ibn Sina by Michiel Borstlap, at the Sapporo Festival in Japan and in 2004 at the Israel Festival in Jerusalem, where she took part in Hermann Max's performance of Bach's St Matthew Passion.
