= Von Hagen =

von Hagen or vom Hagen is a surname. Notable people with the surname include:

- Aga vom Hagen (1872–1949), German painter, author, and art patron
- Albrecht von Hagen (1904–1944), German jurist and resistance fighter
- Elizabeth Joanetta Catherine von Hagen (1750–1809), Dutch pianist, music educator and composer
- Emma von Hagen (died 1992), American politician
- Johann Ludwig von Hagen (1492–1547), Archbishop of Trier
- Kristeen Von Hagen (born 1976), Canadian comedian and actor
- Mark von Hagen (1954–2019), American historian
- Victor Wolfgang von Hagen (1908–1985), American explorer, historian and anthropologist
