= Viktor of Xanten =

Saint Viktor of Xanten
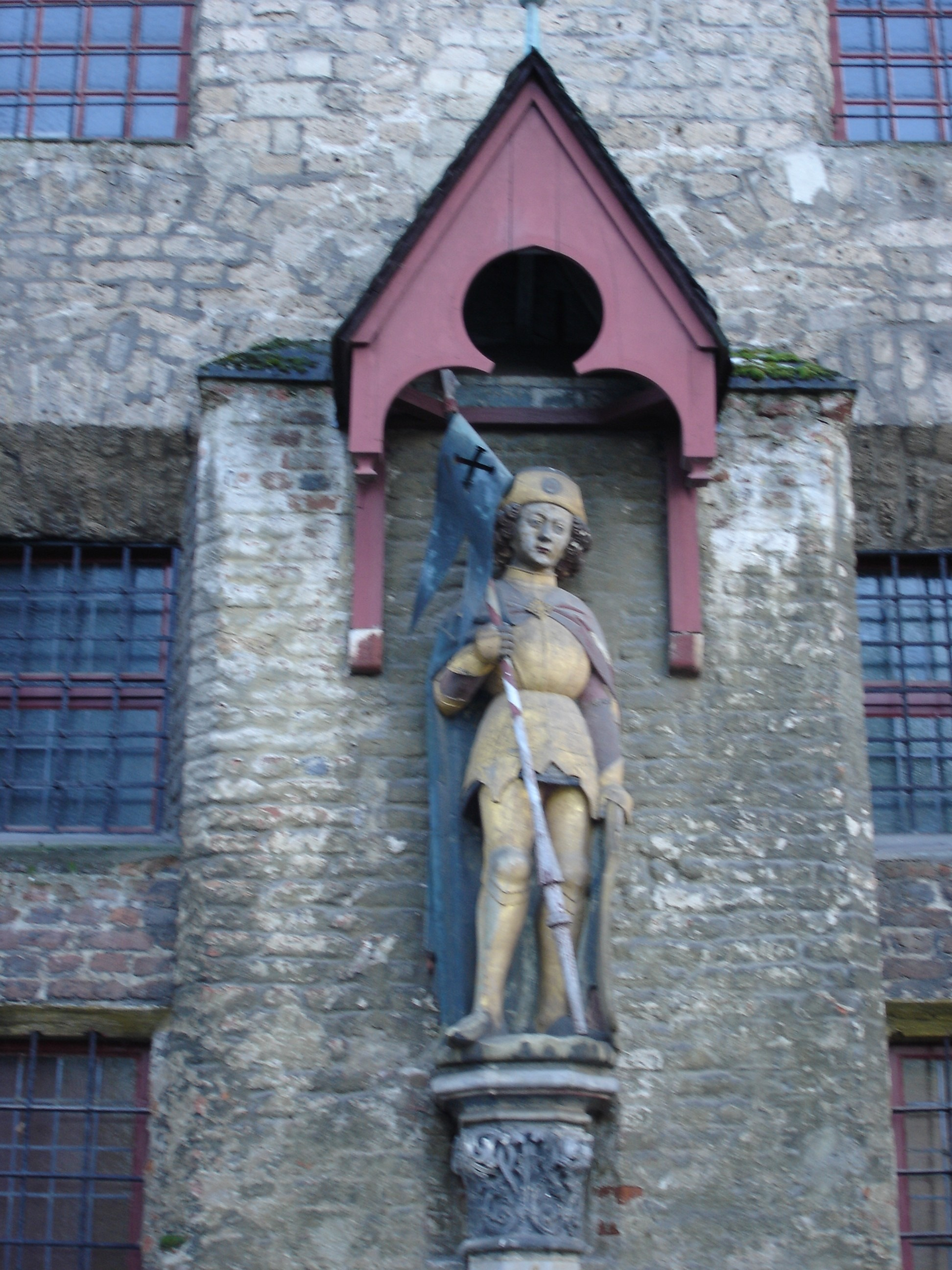
- Statue of Saint Viktor outside Xanten Cathedral
- Died: 4th century
- Venerated in: Roman Catholic Church, Eastern Orthodox Church
- Major shrine: Xanten Cathedral
- Feast: October 10
- Attributes: Military attire

Viktor of Xanten was a 4th century martyr and saint recognized by the Roman Catholic Church and the Eastern Orthodox Church. Since the 12th century, his presumed bones have been kept in a shrine, which is embedded in the high altar of the Xanten Cathedral. His feast day is October 10.

== Narrative ==
Tradition states that Viktor, as a Praefectus cohortis of a Cohort of the Theban Legion, was not caught up in the decimation at Agaunum but then fell victim to the persecution under Emperor Maximian together with other companions in Xanten. He was executed in the amphitheater of Castra Vetera (the site of present-day Xanten) for refusing to sacrifice to the Roman gods. He was closely associated with Ursus of Solothurn, and is said to have been a relative of Saint Verena.

Viktor was first mentioned by Gregory of Tours in connection with the discovery of the bones of a Mallosus in the village of Birten, today a suburb of Xanten. The place name "Xanten" is also derived as "ze santen", which thus refers to a widely known and revered burial place. According to legend, Helena of Constantinople recovered the bones of Viktor and his legion and erected a chapel in their honour.

According to other traditions, he was a companion of Gereon of Cologne. The tradition of Viktor as a member of the Theban Legion is mixed with that of Victor of Agaunum and Victor of Solothurn.

== Sources ==
- Ekkart Sauser (2003). "Victor von Xanten". In Bautz, Traugott (ed.). Biographisch-Bibliographisches Kirchenlexikon (BBKL) (in German). Vol. 21. Nordhausen: Bautz. col. 1511. ISBN 3-88309-110-3.
- (in Dutch) H.Victor van Xanten
