= Forssberg =

Forssberg is a surname, likely of Swedish origin. Notable people with the surname include:

- Fredrika Limnell (1816–1897), born Catharina Forssberg, Swedish philanthropist, mecenate, feminist, and salonist
- Lolotte Forssberg (1766–1840), Swedish noble and lady-in-waiting
- Olof Forssberg (1938–2023), Swedish jurist and civil servant
- Ted Forssberg (1895–1953), Australian cricketer

== See also ==
- Forsberg
