= Hagens =

Hagens is a patronymic surname of Northern German and Dutch origins. It is a patronym of the given name Hagen, which is derived from the Old German element hag ("enclosure").

Notable people with the surname include:

- Bradin Hagens (born 1989), American baseball player
- Erik Hagens (born 1940), Danish painter
- Gunther von Hagens (1945–2026), German anatomist
- Hendrik Hagens (1900–1981), Dutch fencer
- James Hagens (born 2006), American ice hockey player
- Joseph von Hagens (1826–1899), German entomologist
- Pieter Jan Hagens (born 1958), Dutch radio and television presenter

== See also ==
- Hagen (surname)
