= Ulrich Hagen =

German radiobiologist (1925–2007)

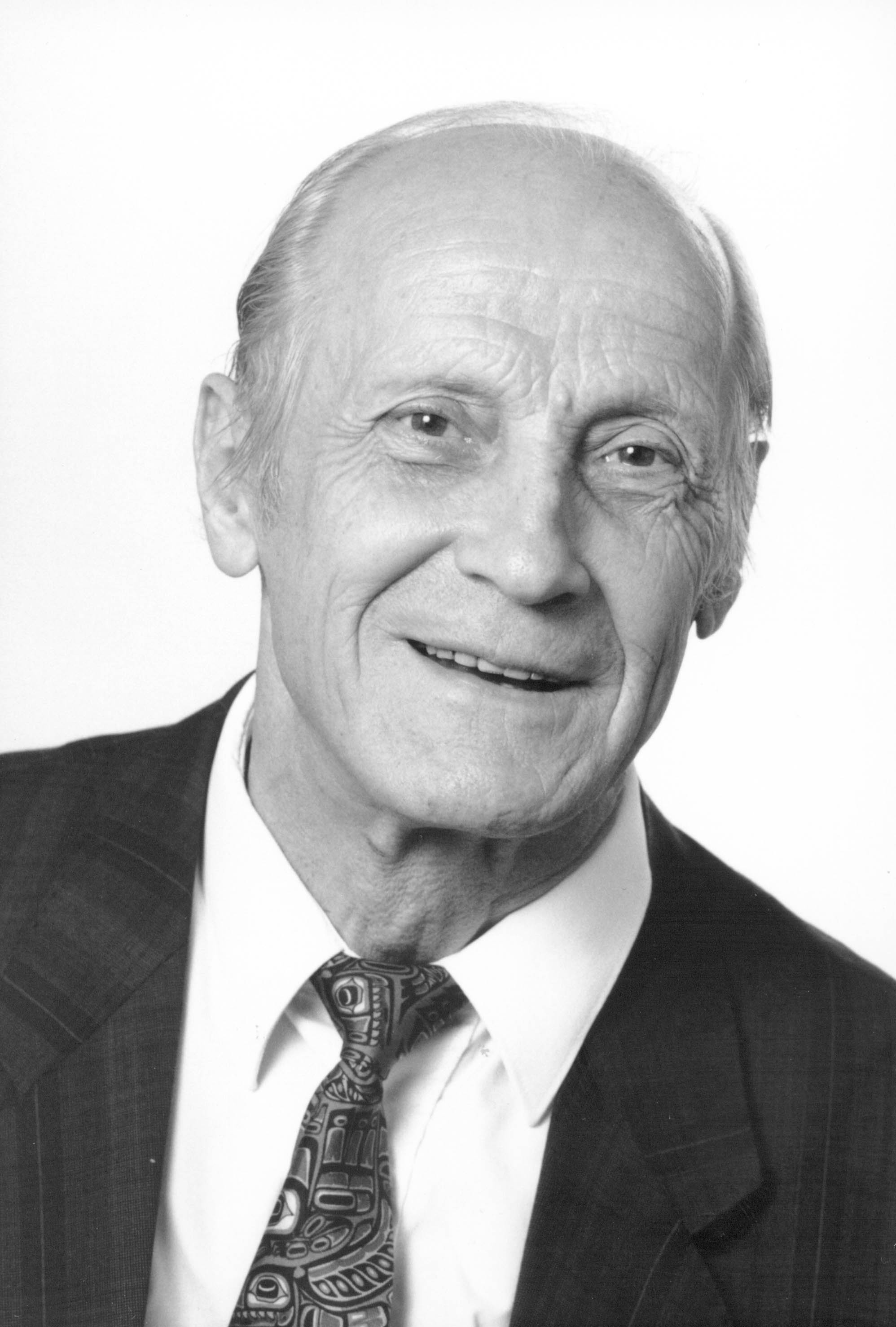
- Born: February 21, 1925; Frankfurt am Main, Hesse-Nassau, Weimar Republic
- Died: November 25, 2007 (aged 82)

Ulrich Hagen (February 21, 1925 – November 25, 2007) was a German radiobiologist, regarded as one of the German pioneers in the field of molecular radiation biology.

Hagen developed analytical techniques that would allow an examination and analysis of various types of DNA damage. He was among the first German radiation biologists to become aware of the important role of DNA repair in endpoints such as mutagenesis, aberration formation, cell death, and carcinogenesis.

== Life ==
Hagen was born in Frankfurt am Main and raised in Augsburg, where he attended the St. Anna Gymnasium. His father Wilhelm Hagen was a pediatrician and later an important public health official in Germany. In 1943, Hagen was conscripted as a paramedic in the Wehrmacht and spent a year as a prisoner of war following the surrender of Germany. In 1946, he began attending the Ludwig-Maximilians-Universität München, where he graduated in 1952 with doctoral degrees in Medicine and Biology. In 1953, he was given a fellowship position at Heiligenberg Institute (one of the leading German institutes for Radiation Biology after WWII), which was then under the directorship of Hanns Langendorff.

In the early days at Heiligenberg, Professor Hagen researched the radioprotective substances and cell death in lymphocytes and conducted research in Stockholm, in Professor Forssberg's laboratory. It was in Stockholm that Professor Hagen became acquainted with isolated DNA. There he realized the importance of the cellular effects of ionising radiation in relationship with DNA damage repair. Immediately following this, he began developing analytical techniques that would allow an examination and analysis of various types of DNA damage, which made Hagen an important pioneer in the field of Molecular Radiation Biology.

Ulrich Hagen continued his research work as 'Privatdozent' at the Radiological Institute of the University of Freiburg, from 1961 to 1965. In 1965, he accepted an appointment at the Institute of Radiation Biology of the Kernforschungszentrum Karlsruhe (under the leadership of Karl Günter Zimmer). He remained there for 12 years studying the structure of irradiated DNA. During those years, he recognized and documented the problem of RNA polymerase inhibition by damaged DNA templates and was among the first German radiation biologists to become aware of the important role of DNA repair, as relates to endpoints: mutagenesis, aberration formation, cell death, and carcinogenesis. Ulrich Hagen became the Director of the Institute of Radiation Biology of the GSF – Gesellschaft für Strahlenforschung in Neuherberg (which was later renamed GSF – National Research Center for Environment and Health), in 1979. As the Director of Radiation Biology of the GSF, he was able to unify a number of heterogeneous radiological disciplines that had arisen at the GSF institute. In 1995, he was elected President of the 10th International Congress of Radiation Research in Würzburg, Germany and was, for 16 years, the Managing Editor of Radiation and Environmental Biophysics, Springer-Verlag.

== Awards and honors ==
Hagen's scientific career is documented by numerous publications and by several eminent awards:

- Röntgen Award, University of Giessen (1966)
- Weiss Medal, British Association for Radiation Research (1976)
- Hanns-Lagendorff Medal (1997)
