= Xantener Sommerfestspiele =

Xantener Sommerfestspiele was a theatre festival held in Xanten, North Rhine-Westphalia, Germany.
