= Silvia Hagen =

Silvia Hagen is an author who has published for O'Reilly Media on such topics as Internet Protocol version 6 in a book titled "IPv6 Essentials". She lives in Switzerland. In 2010, Silvia joined the BlueCat Networks Technical Advisory Board. She has many years of experience in consulting enterprises in Europe and the US for the introduction of IPv6. Since 2014 she engages in the agile community, co-founded the network flowdays and brings more and more agile elements in the complex task of IPv6 planning and deployment.

== Bibliography ==
- Silvia Hagen (2016). IPv6. Grundlagen - Funktionalität - Integration (3 ed.). p. 504. ISBN 9783952294239.
- Silvia Hagen (2014). IPv6 Essentials (3 ed.). O'Reilly Media. ISBN 9781449319212.
- Silvia Hagen (2011). Planning for IPv6. O'Reilly Media. ISBN 9781449305390.
- Silvia Hagen; Stephanie Lewis (1999). Novell's Guide to Troubleshooting TCP/IP. Novell Press. ISBN 978-0764545627.
