= Emma von Hagen =

American politician (died 1992)

Member of the Connecticut House of Representatives from Haddam
- In office 1953–1963
- Preceded by: Clementine D. Hubbard; Carl V. Christianson
- Succeeded by: Ewald George Carlson; Edward Weiss

Personal details
- Born: Higganum, Connecticut, U.S.
- Died: April 27, 1992 Vero Beach, Florida, U.S.
- Party: Republican

Emma Louise von Hagen (died April 27, 1992) was an American politician who served in the Connecticut House of Representatives from 1953 to 1963, representing the town of Haddam as a Republican. She sought reelection in 1962 but did not win the nomination. From 1937 to 1943, von Hagen served on the Haddam Board of Education. She died on April 27, 1992, in Vero Beach, Florida.
