= Eva Louise Buus =

Danish artist (born 1979)

Eva Louise Buus (born 1979) is a Danish artist. A graduate of the Royal Danish Academy of Fine Arts, she has exhibited in Denmark, Germany and Greenland. Her landscapes are principally concerned with the effects of light and darkness on the appearance of her images. In 2015, she exhibited works in Fanø Museum which she had created by subjecting plates of copper to the effects of various acids, inspired by the landscapes of the Swedish painter Carl Johan Forsberg. More recently her metallic works have drawn on his recently rediscovered watercolours of women.

== Biography ==
While a student at the Royal Academy, Buus was awarded the 2008 Caspar David Friedrich Prize in Greifswald, northern Germany which led to a solo exhibition "Expanding Nature" there the following year. Her first major solo exhibition in Denmark was "Colour me Blind" (2011) at the Galleri Christina Wilson in Copenhagen. Her works exploited the juxtaposition of colours, apparently revealing tones that were not really present. Details only became evident as the observer moved around in front of each of her images.

In 2012, Buus exhibited works at a solo exhibition titled Hvide Nætter (White Nights) at the Maniitsog Museum in western Greenland with support from the Danish Arts Council. While she had previously worked mainly with "light", her landscapes now also covered "darkness" as an important component of life in Greenland. The works on display responded to the intensity of the light in the room. When the lighting was dim, they revealed surprising detail and colour while in bright light, only outlines could be seen. At the end of the year, in collaboration with Krista Rosenkilde, she participated in the "Light - Heavy" exhibition at the Gentofte Central Library north of Copenhagen in which her "light" paintings stood in sharp contrast to Rosenkilde's three-dimensional forms.

In 2013, Buus exhibited at the Caspar-David-Friedrich-Zentrum in Greifswald, explaining her works were painted with a greatly reduced colour palette. This caused the almost complete disappearance of the contrasts and colours, leaving images that were virtually monochrome. "Although the motifs are detailed and figuratively formed, they first remain latent until the eyes become accustomed to the contrasts in the colouring. Only then do the motifs begin to emerge," she commented.

In March 2015 at Fanø Kunstmuseum, Buus exhibited a series of images on metal plates crafted by applying various acids. The motifs were inspired by the works of the Swedish artist Carl-Johan Forsberg who painted scenes on the island of Fanø. She explained she had fallen in love with Forsberg's works when she first saw his painting "Sønderho Havn ved nat" (Sønderho Harbour at Night) which she has reinterpreted applying her new approach.

Another exhibition involving Buus's interpretations of Forsberg attracted hundreds to the Rønnebæksholm culture centre near Næstved for a vernissage on 19 September 2016. Buus has continued to develop her interest in the Swedish painter, especially after she discovered watercolours of both attractive and rather ugly, corpulent women in the archives of Fanø Museum. The exhibition now presents Forsberg's originals side by side with Buus's evolving metallic interpretations of the women he painted with an eye for beauty. The exhibition, bringing attention not only to Forsberg but above all to Buus, is scheduled to continue until 18 December.

In April 2026, Buus organized an exhibition in Horsholm titled "Mellem Jord og Himmlen" (Between Earth and Heaven). Inspired by nature, gardens and culture, it presented archetypes from Nordic and Greek mythology in which figures of godesses provide reflections of time, transition and concern.

== Other interests ==
In addition to her paintings, Buus also exhibited her "Go Baby Glow" elephant in the 2011 Copenhagen Elephant Parade. Turning to ceramics, in 2014, she designed plates for Royal Copenhagen which were presented as awards for the winners of the Årets Ret (Dish of the Year) competition in September 2014.

== Exhibitions ==
Buus's works have been presented at numerous solo exhibitions. These include:

- 2006, Opposites, Private Bag Gallery, Lusaka, Zambia
- 2006, Summer, Østfynsk Kunstforening, Nyborg, Denmark
- 2008, Hvide Dimensioner (White Dimensions), Q, Copenhagen
- 2009, Expanding Nature, Pomeranian State Museum, Greifswald, Germany
- 2009, Currents in Time, with Anna Örtemo, Æglageret, Holbæk
- 2011, Colour me Blind, Galleri Christina Wilson, Copenhagen
- 2011, Nattebilleder (Night Paintings), Projekt:Rum, Copenhagen
- 2012, Hvide Nætter (White Nights), Maniitsoq Museum, Greenland
- 2013, Heavy><Light, Traneudstillingen, Copenhagen
- 2013, Expanding Color, Caspar-David-Friedrich-Galerie, Greifswald
- 2015, Slægtskab (Kinship): Eva Louise Buus interprets Forsberg's work, Fanø Kunstmuseum
- 2016, Forestillinger om Skønhed (Notions of Beauty): Carl Johan Forsberg & Eva Louise Buus, Rønnebæksholm

She has also participated in the following group exhibitions:

- 2003, OPEC, The Royal Danish Academy of Fine Arts, Copenhagen
- 2003, This is what the Taxpayers pay for, Rådmandskælderen, Copenhagen,
- 2003, Charlottenborg Spring Exhibition, Copenhagen
- 2004, Kunstnernes Efterårsudstilling (Autumn Exhibition), Den Frie Udstilling, Copenhagen
- 2004, Filosofa: Vejle, Espergærde, Gilleleje
- 2004, Back Room, Galleri Egelund, Copenhagen
- 2004, Byens Lys (City Lights), Christiania, Copenhagen, DK
- 2004, Ung Kunst (Young Art), Inkonst, Malmö, Sweden and Frederiks Bastion, Copenhagen
- 2004, E.L.B, Kommunernes Landsforening, Copenhagen
- 2004, Mix, St. Kongensgade 68, Copenhagen
- 2004, Charlottenborg Spring Exhibition, Copenhagen
- 2005, Den 8., Førstetilvenstre, København
- 2005, Pro-Art, Randers Museum of Art, Randers
- 2005, Folosofa, Center for Eksperimenterende Kunst, Børkop
- 2006, Paperbang, Galleri Fung Sway, Copenhagen
- 2006, Back to the Future, Galleri Rebecca Kormind, Copenhagen
- 2006, Passionsdage (Passion Days), Lauritz.com, Øksnehallen, Copenhagen
- 2006, Summer Show, Galleri Rebecca Kormind, Copenhagen
- 2006, Charlottenborg Spring Exhibition], Copenhagen
- 2007, Girls Going North, Galleri Himmelhav, Frederikshavn
- 2007, Thisted Biennale, Thisted
- 2008, Wonderful Copenhagen, Copenhagen
- 2009, Exit 09, Kunstforeningen, Copenhagen
- 2009, Juleudstilling (Christmas Show), Galleri Krydder, Sogndal, Norway
- 2010, X-Tra Light, Galleri Kant, Esbjerg
- 2010, PT10 – Påskeudstillingen 2010, West Jutland Art Museum, Tistrup
- 2012, Konstens Landskap, Tjörnedala Konsthall/ÖSKG, Sweden

== Bibliography ==
- Buus, Eva Louise; Agersnap, Birgitte (2009). Hvide dimensioner (in Danish). Eva Louise Buus.
