= Natascha Hagen =

- Origin: Austria
- Genres: Eurodance; Europop
- Years active: 1991–present
- Labels: Vale Music (Universal Music Group); Blanco Y Negro; Fonovisa
- Website: nataschahagen.com

Natascha Hagen is a singer and songwriter from Austria.

== Career ==
Natascha's artistic development began with absorbing as much knowledge around the world as she could (courses at the Lee Strasberg Theatre Institute (New York), Liverpool Institute for Performing Arts, private singing (Speech Level Singing), dancing and acting classes.)

She lived for a few years in Barcelona, where she released various successful singles, which were licensed in several countries. Her biggest hit was the song "You & You", which was aired for a perfume TV-commercial and climbed the Spanish charts up to number two. The song was remixed by producers for record companies, such as, Todd Terry's label "Warlock Records" (U.S.A.).

She co-wrote most of her released songs and also wrote songs for other artists, such as Gisela, which earned her double platinum as a songwriter.

In 2010 her song "Never Let You Down" was a finalist in the category Pop in the "Song of the Year" Songwriting competition with judges like Randy Jackson, Gene Simmons, Rihanna, Willie Nelson and Kelly Clarkson, and in 2011 she was a winner of an honorable award in the USA Songwriting Competition for "Chicki Chicki Boom".

Recently Korean female superstar "Kim Bo Kyung" released her mini-album "GroWing", where Natascha co-wrote the song "Without you", which was also released as a single.

Now Hagen is working on the release of new songs as an artist.

=== Top 15 Charts positions as an artist ===
- You & You: Number 2 in Spain
- My Heart Will Go On: Number 14 in Spain
- The Beauty of Life: Number 13 in Spain
- Without You: Number 13 in Spain

=== Music nominations ===
Calling you: SGAE and AIE nomination for best song in the field of "Other musical categories"

== Discography ==
- You & You (1997)
- Calling You (1997)
- My Heart Will Go On (1998)
- Sweet La La Love (2000)
- Que Sera Dec (2000)
- Without You Jan (2002)
- Hero Jun (2002)
- Love Keeps Us Together (2003)
