= John Hagen =

Canadian surgeon (born 1956)

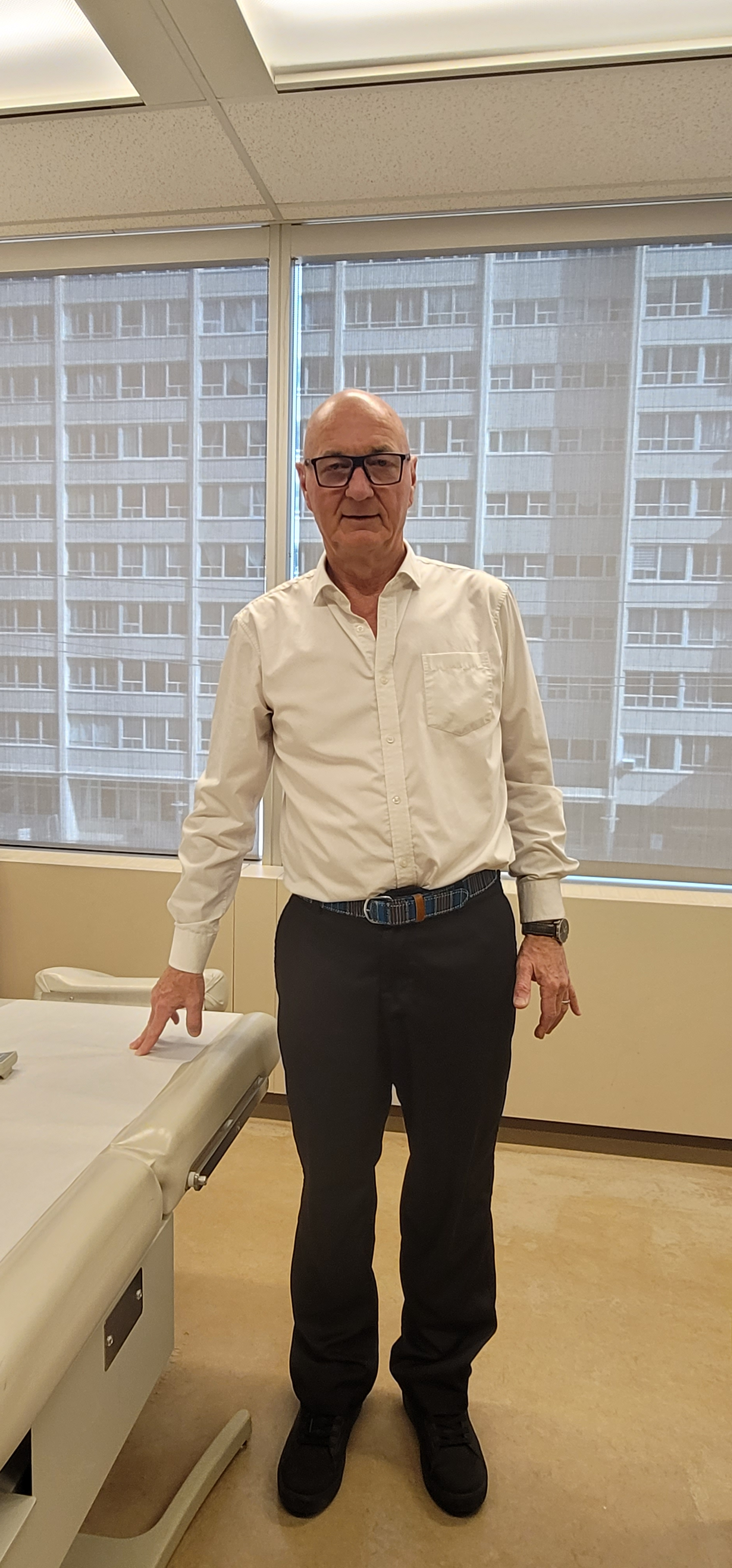
- Born: April 7, 1956 (age 70); Aklavik, Northwest Territories, Canada
- Occupation: Surgeon

Academic background
- Education: University of Alberta

Academic work
- Discipline: Surgery
- Sub-discipline: Laparoscopy, bariatrics
- Institutions: University of Toronto; Humber River Regional Hospital
- Main interests: Laparoscopic surgery and bariatrics

John Hagen (born April 7, 1956) is a Canadian surgeon who specializes in laparoscopic surgery and bariatrics. He served as the Chief of Surgery at Humber River Regional Hospital (HRH) from 2013 to 2020, then Chief of Staff from 2020 to 2022. Hagen was also an assistant professor and lecturer at the University of Toronto.

== Early life and education ==
John Hagen was born on April 7, 1956, in Aklavik, Northwest Territories, Canada. Both of his parents were physicians. He completed his medical degree at the University of Alberta, Faculty of Medicine, in 1979, earning a Doctor of Medicine (Honours).

After graduating, Hagen pursued a mixed internship in Christchurch, New Zealand, in 1980, gaining valuable international experience in his early medical career. He then proceeded to undertake his general surgery residency at the Department of Surgery, University of Toronto, in 1984, where he specialized in laparoscopic surgery.

Hagen became a Fellow of the Royal College of Physicians and Surgeons of Canada (FRCS(C)) in 1984.

In 1985, he completed an endoscopy program at the Aichi Cancer Center Hospital in Nagoya, Japan. Subsequently, he enrolled in an endoscopy program at Middlesex Hospital in London the same year.

== Career ==
John Hagen has worked for over 37 years as a staff surgeon at Humber River Regional Hospital (HRH), specializing in laparoscopic surgery and advancing minimally invasive surgical techniques. He has served as the Surgical Director of Bariatrics at HRH since 2007, where he performed obesity treatment using surgical methods.

Hagen is an assistant professor and lecturer in the Department of Surgery at the University of Toronto, actively involved in training residents and fellows in laparoscopic and bariatric surgery.

In 2014, he was honored with the Mentor of the Year Award - Region 3 (Ontario and Nunavut) by the Royal College of Physicians and Surgeons of Canada.

Throughout his career, Hagen has held various hospital positions and privileges, including surgeon roles at Northwestern General Hospital and Humber River Hospital (HRH). He was also the Chief of Surgery, Division Head of General Surgery, and Chief of Staff at HRH.

=== International work ===
Hagen has organized and led seven trips to China, where he and a team of North American doctors provided interactive lecture sessions at hospitals across the country. During these sessions, he primarily focused on teaching laparoscopic colon resections and cholecystectomies. As part of the exchange program, two minimally invasive fellows from Toronto are sent to China, while two Chinese surgeons visit Humber River Hospital for a period of 6–8 weeks.

Hagen has participated in medical missions to Guatemala with HELPS International. These missions aim to provide primary care to patients in impoverished and remote areas of the country. The majority of the cases during these missions involve hernias, as diagnostic capabilities are limited in these remote regions.
