= Xanten =

Town in North Rhine-Westphalia, Germany

- Town
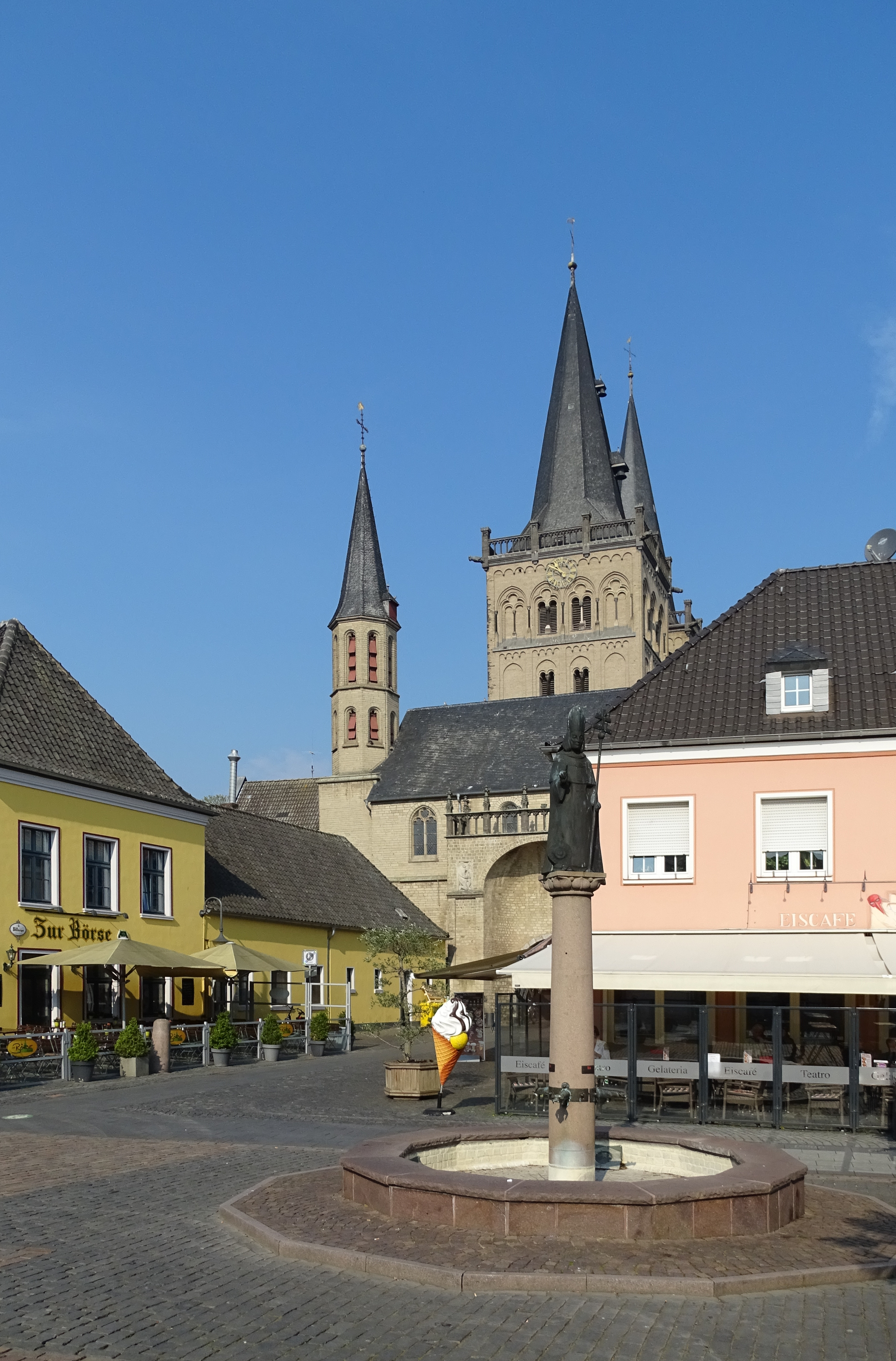

- Coat of arms

- Location of Xanten within Wesel district
- Interactive map of Xanten
- Location within Germany Location within North Rhine-Westphalia
- Coordinates: 51°39′44″N 06°27′14″E
- Country: Germany
- State: North Rhine-Westphalia
- Admin. region: Düsseldorf
- District: Wesel
- Subdivisions: 6 Stadtbezirke

Government
  - Mayor (2025–30): Rafael Zur (FoX)

Area
  - Total: 72.43 km^{2} (27.97 sq mi)
- Elevation: 50 m (160 ft)

Population (2025-12-31)
  - Total: 21,121
  - Density: 291.6/km^{2} (755.3/sq mi)
- Time zone: UTC+01:00 (CET)
  - Summer (DST): UTC+02:00 (CEST)
- Postal codes: 46509
- Dialling codes: 02801 and 02804 (Marienbaum)
- Vehicle registration: WES
- Website: www.xanten.de

Xanten (German pronunciation: [ˈksantn̩], Low Rhenish: Santen) is a town in the state of North Rhine-Westphalia, Germany. It is located in the district of Wesel.

Xanten is known for the Xanten Archeology Park, one of the largest archaeological open air museums in the world, built to encompass the site of the Roman city Colonia Ulpia Traiana. Other attractions include the medieval town centre with Xanten Cathedral, many museums and large man-made lakes for various watersport activities. Xanten is visited by approximately one million tourists a year. It is also the only German town with a name that begins with X.

== Geography ==
Xanten is made up of three boroughs (Ortsteile): Hochbruch, Niederbruch, and the town centre. Other localities (Bezirke) belonging to the town of Xanten include Birten, Lüttingen, Marienbaum, Vynen, Obermörmter, Wardt, Mörmter, Willich, Beek and Ursel. Parts of a nature reserve called Bislicher Insel are located in the municipality as well.

The town borders the Lower Rhine and the town of Rees to the north, the town of Wesel to the east, the municipalities of Alpen and Sonsbeck to the south, and the towns of Uedem and Kalkar to the west.

The closest international airport is Weeze Airport (also called Niederrhein Airport; Ryanair hub) in Weeze (25 km); the closest intercontinental airport is Düsseldorf Airport (60 km). It has a station on the Rheinhausen–Kleve railway, which connects to Duisburg via Moers.

== History ==
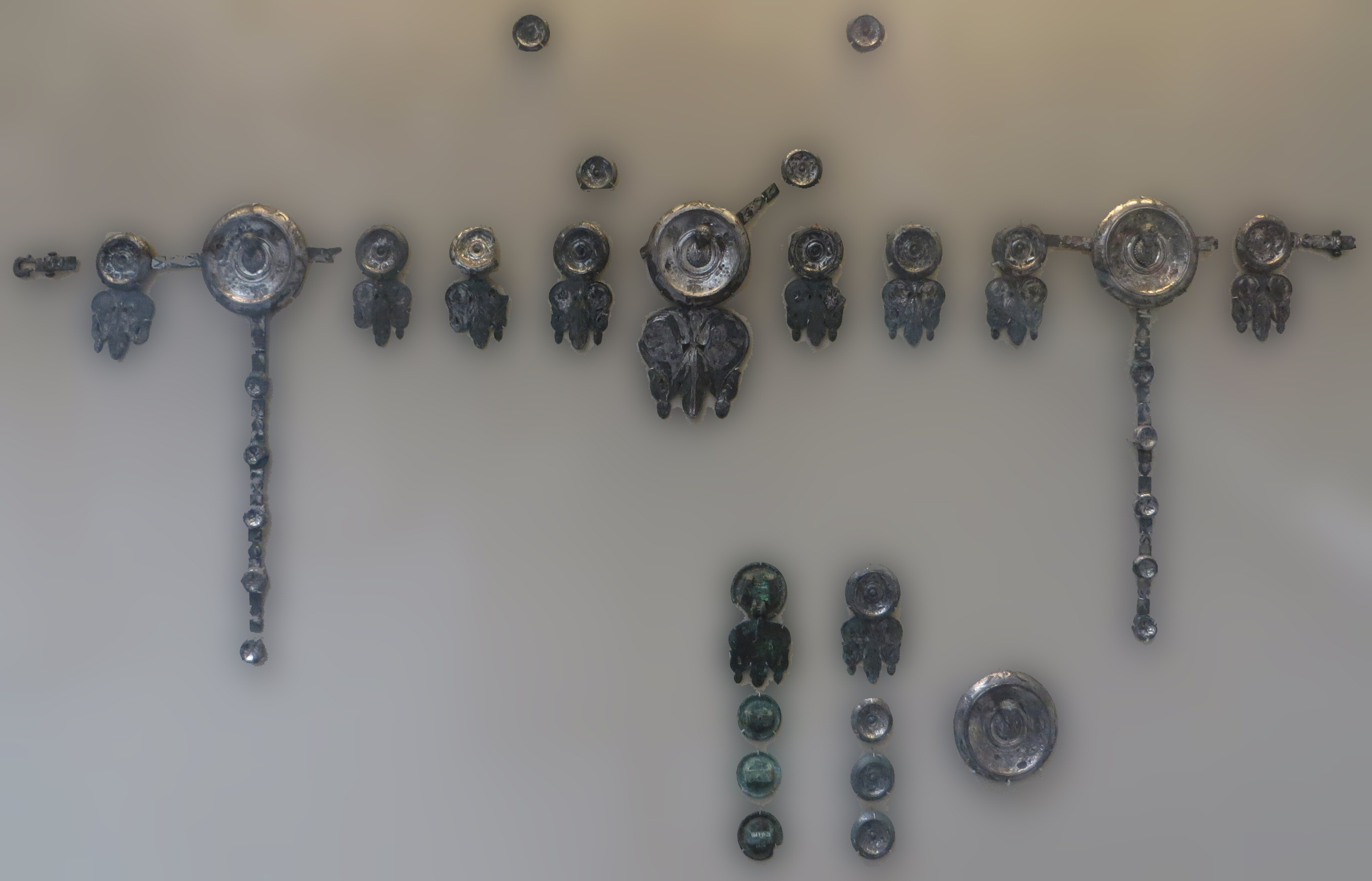
Set of Roman silvered-bronze horse trappings from Xanten, now in the British Museum

=== Antiquity ===
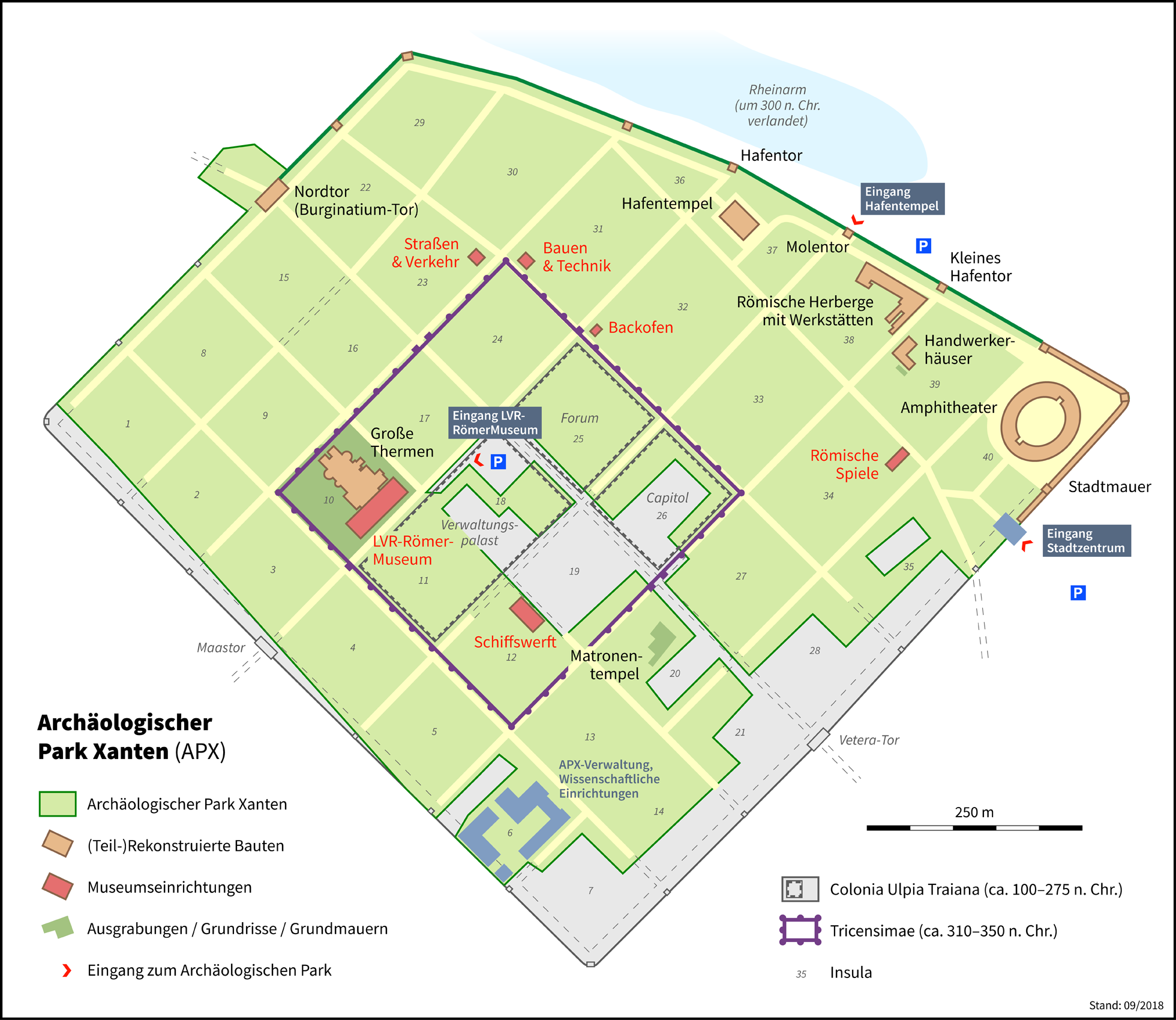
Colonia Ulpia Traiana, Tricensimae, Archäologischer Park Xanten

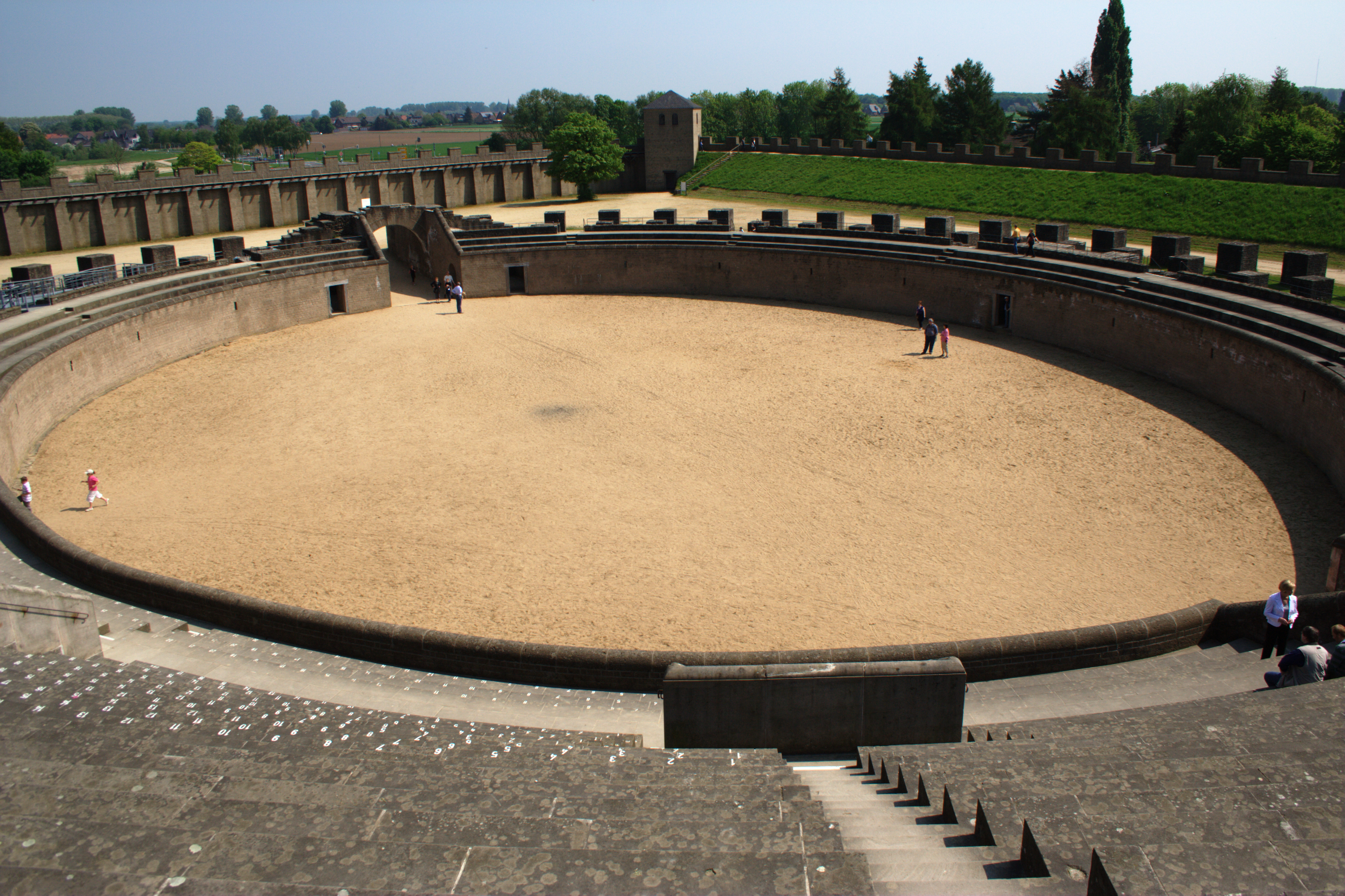
Reconstructed Roman amphitheatre in Archäologischer Park Xanten

The first settlements by isolated tribes can be dated to around the year 2000 BC. Around 15 BC the Roman castrum or camp Vetera was created on the Fürstenberg near modern-day Birten. It was intended as a base for campaigns into Germania and until its destruction during the Revolt of the Batavi in 70 AD it was occupied by 8,000 to 10,000 legionaries, and was the main base of the Classis germanica.

After the destruction of Vetera a second camp was established at the Bislicher Insel, named Castra Vetera II, which became the base camp of Legio VI Victrix. A nearby created settlement, which was inhabited by 10,000 to 15,000 former legionaries and others, was given the rights of a colonia in 110 AD by the Roman emperor Marcus Ulpius Traianus, who renamed the town Colonia Ulpia Traiana. The colonia was a completely new town with a town wall and other buildings like an amphitheatre. For this town the old settlement was completely destroyed. The colonia became the second most important commercial post in the province of Germania Inferior, surpassed only by Colonia Agrippinensis (today's Cologne). In 122, Vetera II became the camp of Legio XXX Ulpia Victrix, replacing VI Victrix which had moved to Britannia.

In 275, the colonia was almost destroyed by Germanic tribes. Subsequently, in 310 in the area of the colonia a new town was established, named Tricensimae ("of the Thirtieth"), which was built on the nine central insula of the former colonia but fortified and more easily defended. At the beginning of the 5th century, assaults by Germanic tribes rapidly increased, with the result that Tricensimae was finally given up.

Around 300, Viktor of Xanten is named among the Theban Legion executed for refusing to sacrifice to the Roman gods. Venerated as a martyr and a saint by the Catholic as well as the Eastern Orthodox Church, Viktor of Xanten is commemorated in Xanten Cathedral, where his relics are kept in a shrine embedded in the high altar.

=== Middle Ages ===
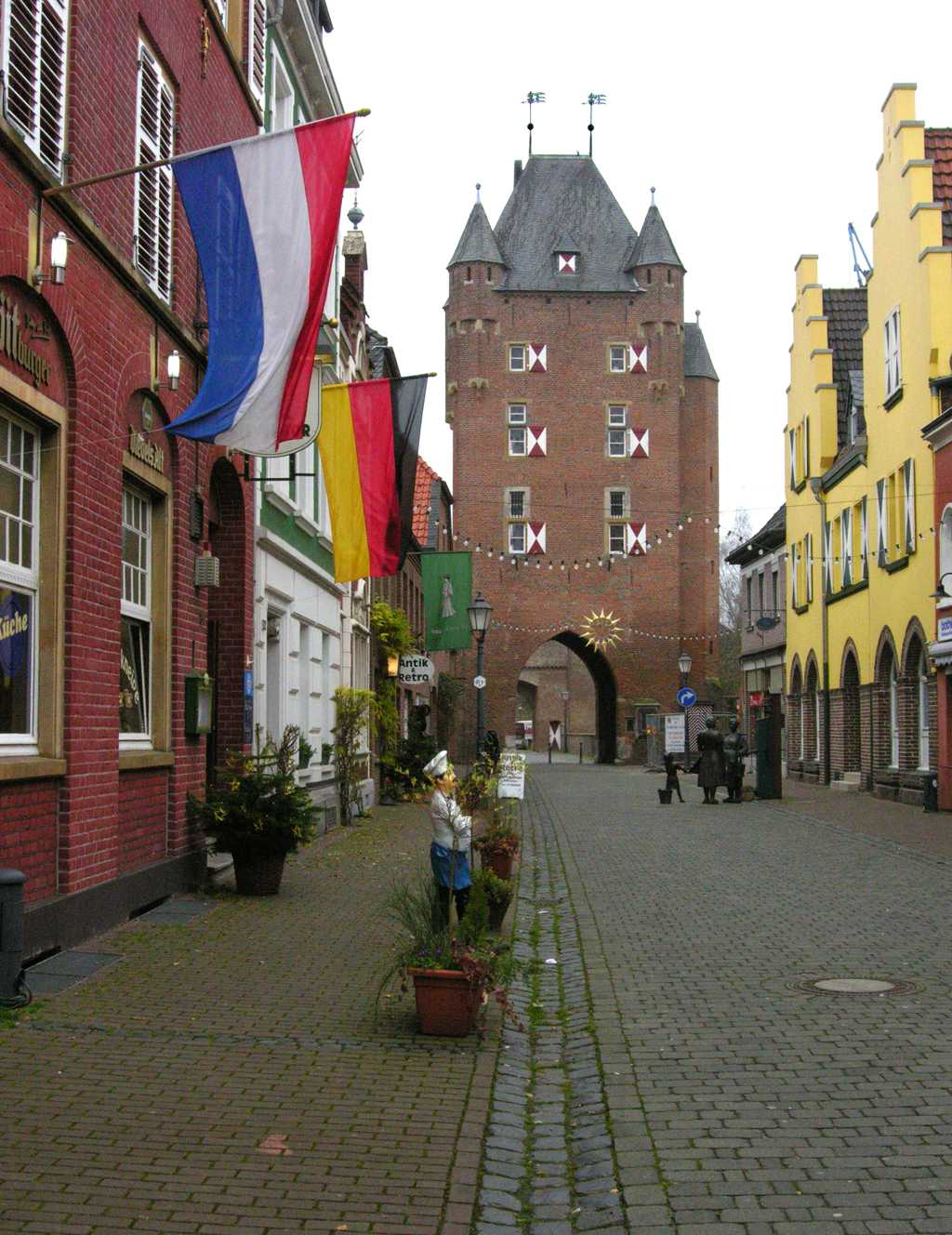
Klever Tor in Xanten

In the 5th century the Franks began to settle in the area of today's Xanten, but no urban settlements have been found from this time as the Franks did not build in stone, unlike the Romans. Only graves from this time have been discovered.

According to the legend of the Nibelungs, the mythical Siegfried of Xanten was born ze Santen an dem Rhîne.

In the second half of the 8th century a church was built on the grounds of an old cemetery of the ancient Roman colony and called Sanctos (super Rhenum) (also mentioned as ad Sanctum). The name of "place of saints" was derived from the assumed grave of the martyr Viktor of Xanten and is the source of today's municipal name of Xanten. After the establishment of a convent to the south, what became today's town centre grew into existence.

In 939 troops under Otto I, King of Germany defeated rebellious Franconian, Saxon and Lotharingian troops under Eberhard of Franconia in the Battle of Birten near Xanten. Following the Battle of Andernach the same year the Rhineland was reaffirmed to the kingdom of Otto I.

While Xanten, with its rich Viktor Convent, was still being besieged by Norsemen in 863, in 1122 the place already appears as part of a trading network at the Lower Rhine. On 15 July 1228, Xanten was given town rights by the Archbishop of Cologne, Heinrich of Molenark.

Xanten had a Jewish community in early medieval times. Two massacres of Jews occurred during the First Crusade, on (1 and 27 June 1096). On the latter occasion some Jews committed suicide in order to escape the fury of the Crusaders.

In 1263 the foundation stone for the Gothic St. Victor cathedral was laid. After 281 years of construction it was finally completed in 1544. By the end of the 14th century, Xanten was surrounded by a town wall.

In 1392 the northern part of the town came into the possession of the Dukes of Cleves, while the southern part remained with the Archbishopric of Cologne. The division of Xanten was a cause of a conflict between Cleves and Cologne, which ended when the whole of Xanten was awarded to the Duchy of Cleves in 1444.

=== Early Modern period ===
After being taken by the Dukes of Cleves, in the wake of war and crop failure, the number of inhabitants slumped from 5,000 at the beginning of the 16th century to approximately 2,500 by the end of the 18th century. The Rhine had been a basis of Xanten's status as a trading town until the river bed shifted away from the town, causing its economic situation to deteriorate. The river even flooded and destroyed the locality of Birten several times.

The borough Marienbaum, however, became the main place of pilgrimage on the Lower Rhine between 1430 and 1441. In 1460 a monastery of the Bridgettines was established, with an abbey church called St. Mariä Himmelfahrt (Assumption of Mary) which nowadays serves as a parish church.

In the 17th century Xanten was (along with Cleves) inherited by the Margraviate of Brandenburg. Protestantism was placed on an equal footing with the Roman Catholic Church, as confirmed by the Treaty of Xanten on 12 November 1614. Thereupon a church was built at the Großer Markt (Great Marketplace), which was expanded with a spire in 1622. Nevertheless, at the beginning of the 20th century only 5% of the population were of Protestant denomination. By the beginning of the 21st century, the Protestant share of the population had increased to some 20%.

=== 19th and early 20th century ===
In 1802, the Viktor-convent was secularized by Napoléon Bonaparte, and the libraries of closed monasteries and the convent library were merged. After that, the economic situation deteriorated more rapidly. A town gate called the Marstor was torn down in 1821, and the Scharntor and parts of the town walls were removed in 1825. The removal of the Klever Tor and a mill called Kriemhildmühle was prevented by a town councillor in 1843. At the same time, the ruins of the Colonia Ulpia Traiana, which had been used as a quarry since the Roman settlement was given up, aroused the interest of archaeologists.

Xanten was administered within the Prussian Rhine Province from 1822 to 1945. Between 1819 and 1844, excavations were carried out at the Roman ruins. In September 1927, the Catholic Church municipality celebrated its 1,600th anniversary; in 1937 Pope Pius XI granted the right for the cathedral of St. Viktor to be called a basilica minor.

In the later part of the 19th century, there was a high-profile case of alleged ritual murder, also known as blood libel. On 29 June 1891, Johann Hegemann, the five-year-old son of a local cabinet maker, was found dead in a neighbour's barn, with his throat cut from ear to ear. Antisemitic agitation connected the Jewish butcher and former shoḥeṭ Adolf Buschoff with this crime, and the local priest, Father Bresser, lent support to this rumour by publishing articles on ritual murder in the paper Bote für Stadt und Land, which he edited. The agitation in the antisemitic press, as well as at antisemitic meetings, where it was insinuated that the Jews had bribed or intimidated the authorities in order to prevent the discovery of the truth, compelled the government to arrest Buschoff and his family (14 October 1891). The evidence against the man, who had always borne a good reputation, was so flimsy, however, that he was discharged (20 December). This action aroused the antisemites to still stronger agitation, which culminated in a heated debate in the Prussian Diet. In the course of this argument, Stoecker, the ex-court chaplain, repeated the accusation of ritual murder, and hinted at Jewish influence as the cause of the failure to find the murderer (7 February 1892). Under pressure from this agitation, Buschoff was rearrested (8 February), and tried before a jury at Cleves (4–14 July 1892). During this trial, it was found that the accusations were based on mere hearsay, and contained impossible assertions. The prosecuting attorney himself moved for the dismissal of the charge, and the jury rendered its verdict accordingly. The real murderer was never discovered, and the possibility that the death of the child was due to an accident was not entirely disproved. The agitation had the effect of reducing the Jewish population of the town, and Buschoff himself had to leave. In 1905, Xanten had about thirty Jews out of a total population of 3,770.

=== Nazi Germany ===
In 1933, mayor Heinrich Wagner was locked up in a tower called the Meerturm, accused of alleged nepotism in the loan business. His successor was Friedrich Karl Schöneborn, while the post of deputy mayor was given to Heinrich Prang junior. Prang had already created a local group of the NSDAP in 1925. As the local council of the Deutsche Zentrumspartei was dissolved, three of formerly eight town council members were group members of the NSDAP. The remaining opposition consisted of communists and liberal politicians lacking a clear political mandate.

The following years saw harassment of the Jewish population of Xanten. This included the destruction of the local prayer room and the devastation of several dwellings of Jewish inhabitants on Reichskristallnacht of 9 November 1938. After these events, the entire Jewish population fled Xanten. In May 1940, the German 256th infantry division was transferred to Xanten to take part in the forthcoming invasion of the Netherlands. During the Second World War an ammunition factory of the Luftwaffe was established in a small forest close to the town, called Die Hees. While citizens of Xanten worked there at the beginning of the war, women and children, and especially foreigners were forced to perform hard labour at the plant as the war progressed. Incidents in the area of the factory occurred in November 1942 and October 1944, causing the explosion of a portion of the stored ammunition, which cost several workers' lives.

When Allied troops reached Xanten in February 1945, mayor Schöneborn left the town. With him fled almost the entire town administration to areas to the east. In the same month the bombardment of the town had begun, killing civilians and destroying parts of Xanten. In addition, the cathedral was hit by Allied bombs and damaged heavily. On 8 March, Xanten was finally taken by Canadian troops. The Canadian military lost, according to their own data, 400 soldiers in the fight against the defending Fallschirmjäger (paratroops) under the command of Eugen Meindl. Thereupon the town, 85% of which had already been destroyed, was occupied by British troops while the population was evacuated to Bedburg-Hau in preparation for the crossing of the Rhine near the town of Wesel. Artillery projectiles fired by German soldiers from the right bank of the Rhine further devastated Xanten at this time. When the crossing of the Rhine finally succeeded on 24 March, the Second World War was over for Xanten.

=== Post-World War II ===
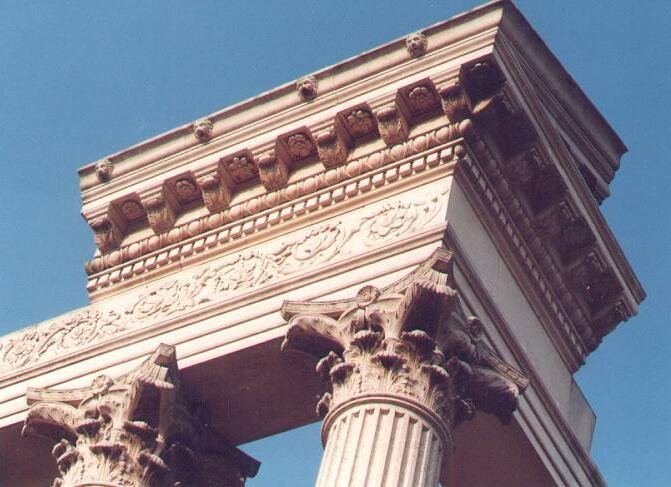
Reconstructed corner of the Hafentempel (harbour temple) in Archäologischer Park Xanten

The reconstruction of the town and the cathedral was influenced particularly by the archaeologist and monument conservationist Walter Bader, and lasted until 1966. Expellees from East Prussia were resettled in Xanten and caused the population to rise by almost 40%. In the course of the local re-organization in 1969, the localities Birten, Lüttingen, Marienbaum, Obermörmter, Vynen and Wardt were integrated into Xanten, so that around 16,000 inhabitants lived within the town boundaries. The area of the town increased from 8 km^{2} to 72 km^{2}.

In 1975, the Archäologischer Park Xanten (Xanten Archaeological Park), a partial reconstruction of the Roman Colonia Ulpia Traiana, was established and opened for tourism.

On 28 November 1988, Xanten was granted the title of a Staatlich anerkannter Erholungsort (state-recognized leisure town) as the first such town in the region of Düsseldorf. Between 1990 and 2004, the number of inhabitants rose from 16,930 to about 22,000.

== Attractions ==
The Xanten Archeology Park is built on the site of the Roman town, and it is one of the most frequently visited parks in Germany. In 2012, the archaeological park was expanded to nearly the whole area of the Roman colonia after Bundesstraße 57 was moved away from the area.

Historical buildings in the town centre have been restored. At the Xantener Südsee and Xantener Nordsee, two lakes connected by a channel close to the localities Wardt and Vynen, the Freizeitzentrum Xanten (Xanten Leisure Center) was established in 1982. Today, it is a popular destination for sailors.

== Culture ==
Big events include the Xantener Sommerfestspiele (a prestigious classical music festival lasting two weeks every summer from 1993 to 2012), the annual KleinMontMartre where artists from all over the world show their latest works as well as the annual German sandcastle-building championship.

== Education ==
Among other schools there is one gymnasium (grammar school), the Stiftsgymnasium Xanten, and a private school for girls, the Marienschule, in Xanten.

== Governance ==
=== Council ===
Seat distribution in the town council after the 2025 elections
Party	Number of seats
CDU	15
SPD	9
FoX	9
Alternative for Germany	6
Alliance '90/The Greens	4
Free Initiative (Xanten)	4
Die Linke	2
FDP	1
BBX	0

== Twin towns – sister cities ==
Xanten is twinned with:

- Beit Sahour, Palestine
- Geel, Belgium
- Saintes, France
- Salisbury, England, United Kingdom

== Notable people ==
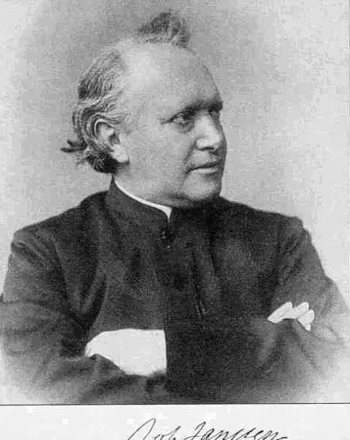
Johannes Janssen in his later years

- Georg Bleibtreu (1828–1892), battle painter
- Gottfried Hagen (1230–1299), Cologne city writer
- Dorothe Ingenfeld (born 1974), operatic mezzo-soprano
- Johannes Janssen (1829–1891), historian
- Otto Lancelle (1885–1941), army general
- Reinhart Maurer (born 1935), philosopher
- Norbert of Xanten (c. 1075–1134), Catholic bishop and founder of the Premonstratensians
- Diederich Franz Leonhard von Schlechtendal (1794–1866), botanist

== Bibliography ==
- Julius Aronius, "Regesten", p. 89, No. 188; p. 92, No. 195). In 1187 the martyrs of Neuss were brought to Xanten to be buried by the side of those martyred in 1096 (p. 144, No. 322)
- Mittheilungen aus dem Verein zur Abwehr des Antisemitismus, 1892, Index, s.v. Xanten and Buschoff
- Allgemeine Zeitung des Judentums 1892, Nos. 29–31
- Der Prozess Buschoff, Leipzig, 1892
- Paul Nathan, Der Prozess Buschoff, Berlin, 1892
- Der Prozess Xanten-Cleve, ibid.
- Ralph Trost, Eine gänzlich zerstörte Stadt. Nationalsozialismus, Krieg und Kriegsende in Xanten. Münster: Waxmann 2004. ISBN 3-8309-1413-X. (online (pdf))
- Der Knabenmord in Xanten vor dem Schwurgericht zu Cleve vom 4. bis 14. Juli 1892, Berlin, 1893 (a complete stenographic record)
- Holger Schmenk, Xanten im 19. Jahrhundert: eine rheinische Kleinstadt zwischen Tradition und Moderne, Cologne / Weimar / Vienna: Böhlau 2008. ISBN 9783412201517.
