= Gottfried Hagen =

Gottfried Hagen (1230–1299) was town clerk of Cologne and author of the Cologne Reimchronik (Rhymed Chronicle).

== Biography ==
Hagen was born in Xanten and educated at the Stiftsschule (today's Städtisches Stiftsgymnasium Xanten). He filled many influential positions, and took an active part in the public life of his native city. Subsequently, to the year 1268, he is mentioned repeatedly in documents as "Magister Godefridus clericus Coloniensis", "Notarius civitatis Coloniensis", pastor (plebanus) of St. Martin the Lesser at Cologne, and dean of the chapter of St. George.

Hagen was an adherent of the group of patricians led by his relatives, the "Overstolzen", and he opposed bitterly both the party of the "Weisen", the despised guilds, and also the archbishops of Cologne, who, as lords of the city, were the natural enemies of the development of Cologne into a free imperial city. Nevertheless, the bishops and still more the see are always treated with respect in his writings.

Hagen gives his name with the title town-clerk (der stede schriver) at the end of his Book of the City of Cologne (Dit is dat boich van der stede Colne).

== Reimchronik ==
The Reimchronik consists of some 3,000 couplets; as a chronicle it is almost complete, if based at times on unreliable traditions. At earliest, it was written in 1270 with a supplement in 1271; it cannot have appeared later than the period between 1277 and 1287.

The Reimchronik is not so much a chronicle as a pamphlet written for a purpose. It was highly esteemed in Cologne as a plea for municipal liberty. After a legendary introduction, permeated with the idea of municipal liberty, it recounts the conflicts between the city of Cologne and the archbishops Conrad and Engelbert II, and the feuds between the patrician party and the guilds in the years 1252–1271.

The 1913 Catholic Encyclopedia describes the Reimchronik as having minimal artistic merit, aside from "some lively descriptions". According to the encyclopedia, the chronicle is valuable as an unusually complete record of a German city of the period, although sometimes biased by Hagen's patriotism.

Several medieval chroniclers have drawn largely upon its contents. For a critical edition of the Reimchronik, see Cardauns and Schröder in Chroniken der niederrheinischen Städte: Köln, I, 1–236, in Chroniken der deutschen Städte, XII (Leipzig, 1875); cf. III, 963.
