= Carl Johan Forsberg =

Swedish open-air painter

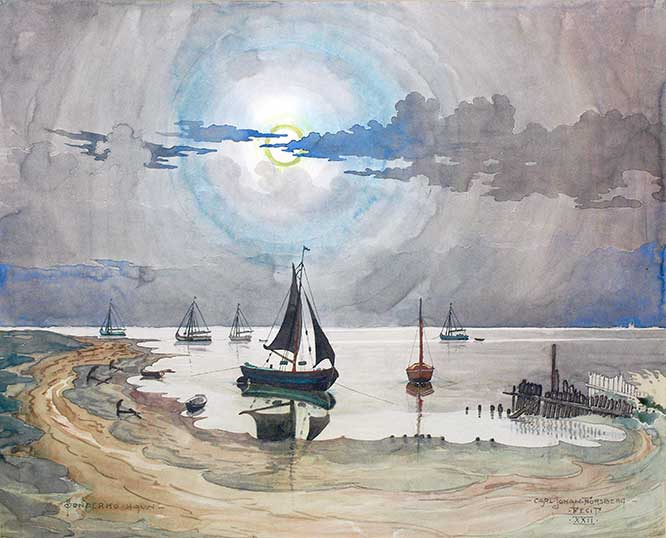
Sønderho Harbour, Fanø, painting by Carl Johan Forsberg

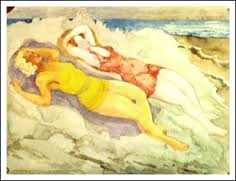
Sunbathers, painting by Carl Johan Forsberg

Carl Johan Wilhelm Forsberg (1868–1938) was a Swedish open-air painter whose works cover landscapes, buildings, animals and women, in watercolour or gouache. After travelling widely, in 1914 he and his Danish wife settled on the Danish island of Fanø where he lived and painted for the rest of his life. There has been renewed interest in Forsberg in recent years as a result of interpretations of his works by the Danish painter Eva Louise Buus.

== Biography ==
Born on 1 August 1868 in Stockholm, Forsberg grew up in a well-to-do family, mixing with Sweden's high society. From 1889 to 1893, he studied architecture at the Royal Institute of Technology. He then went on to the Royal Swedish Academy of Arts where he studied building before attending Axel Tallberg's etching course (1895–96).

Forsberg first exhibited at Stockholm's Konstnärhuset in 1904, receiving consistently negative reports from the critics. After travelling widely, he married the Danish consul's former wife Pia in Nice with whom he had two sons, Hans and William. They frequently returned to Nice but also travelled in southern Europe and Morocco. From 1910 to 1913, they travelled around Denmark and Norway, including Skagen and Lillehammer. In 1913, he published his only literary work Opera which he had illustrated himself. The same year he once again exhibited in Stockholm, now receiving more positive support. He also began to exhibit in Denmark.

In 1914, he and his wife settled in Sønderho on the Danish island Fanø off the west coast of Jutland. He became very productive there, exhibiting every summer. He was reluctant to part from his works, eyeing them like a tiger at the exhibitions.

Forsberg did not become recognized internationally until the 1980s when the Americans became interested in the Northern Lights. Some of his paintings have been sold in London's largest auction houses, as well as in Copenhagen and Stockholm. Since 2015, there has been renewed interest in his landscapes and portraits as a result of interpretations of his works by the Danish painter Eva Louise Buus. Inspired by his paintings, she has created motifs on acid-treated metal plates, exhibiting her works side by side with Forsberg's originals, first at Fanø Kunstmuseum where she concentrated on his landscapes, then at Rønnebækshom where she created her impressions of his paintings of women.
