= Xanten Cathedral =

Cathedral in Xanten, Germany

Coordinates: 51°39′44″N 6°27′14″E

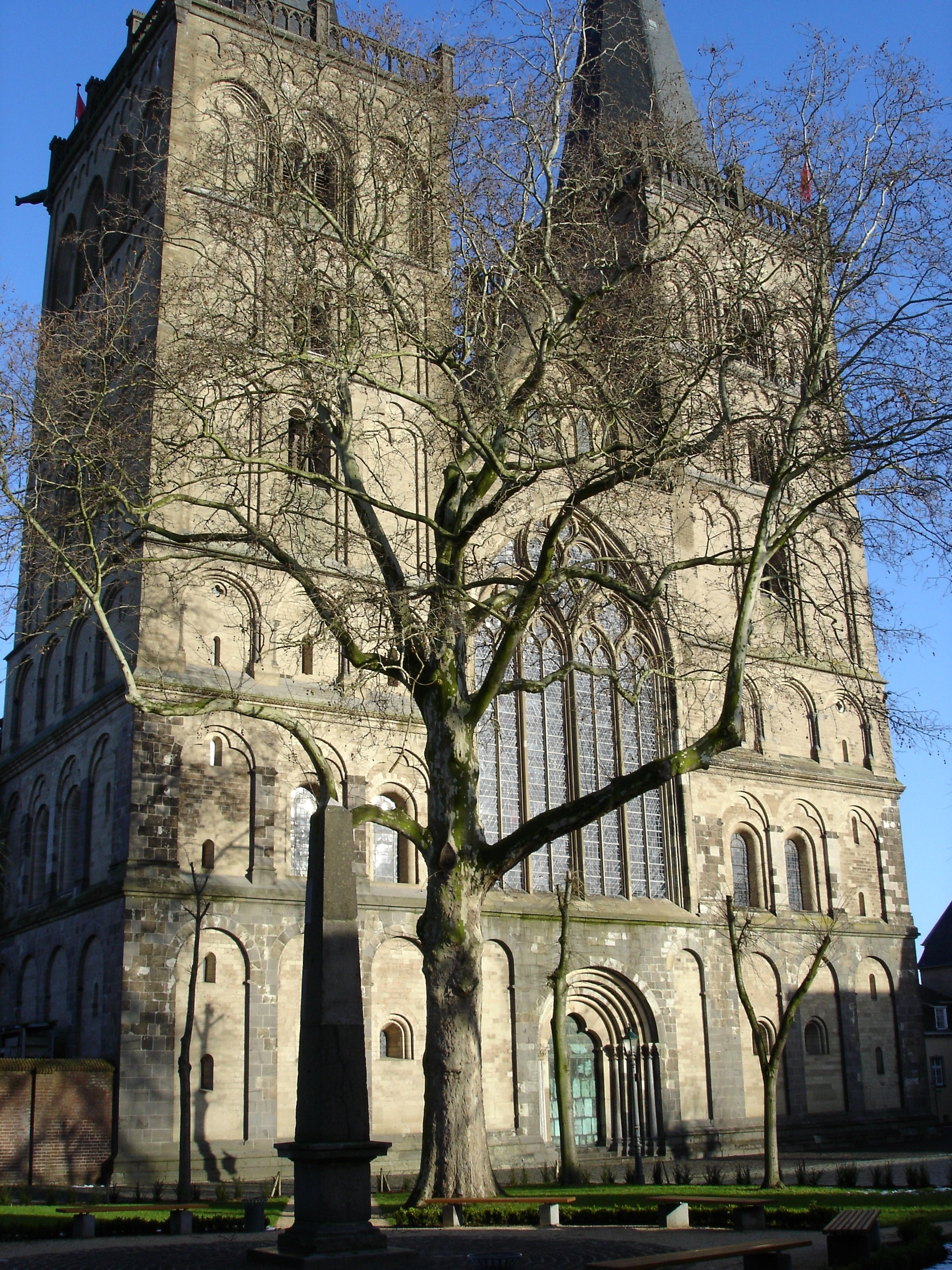
Xanten Cathedral with the de Pauw obelisk

Xanten Cathedral (German: Xantener Dom), sometimes called St. Victor's Cathedral (German: St.-Viktor-Dom), is a Catholic church situated in Xanten, a historic town in the lower Rhine area, North Rhine-Westphalia, Germany. It is considered the biggest cathedral between Cologne and the sea. In 1936 it was declared a minor basilica by Pope Pius XI. Even though the church is called a cathedral, it has never been the seat of a bishop.

== History ==
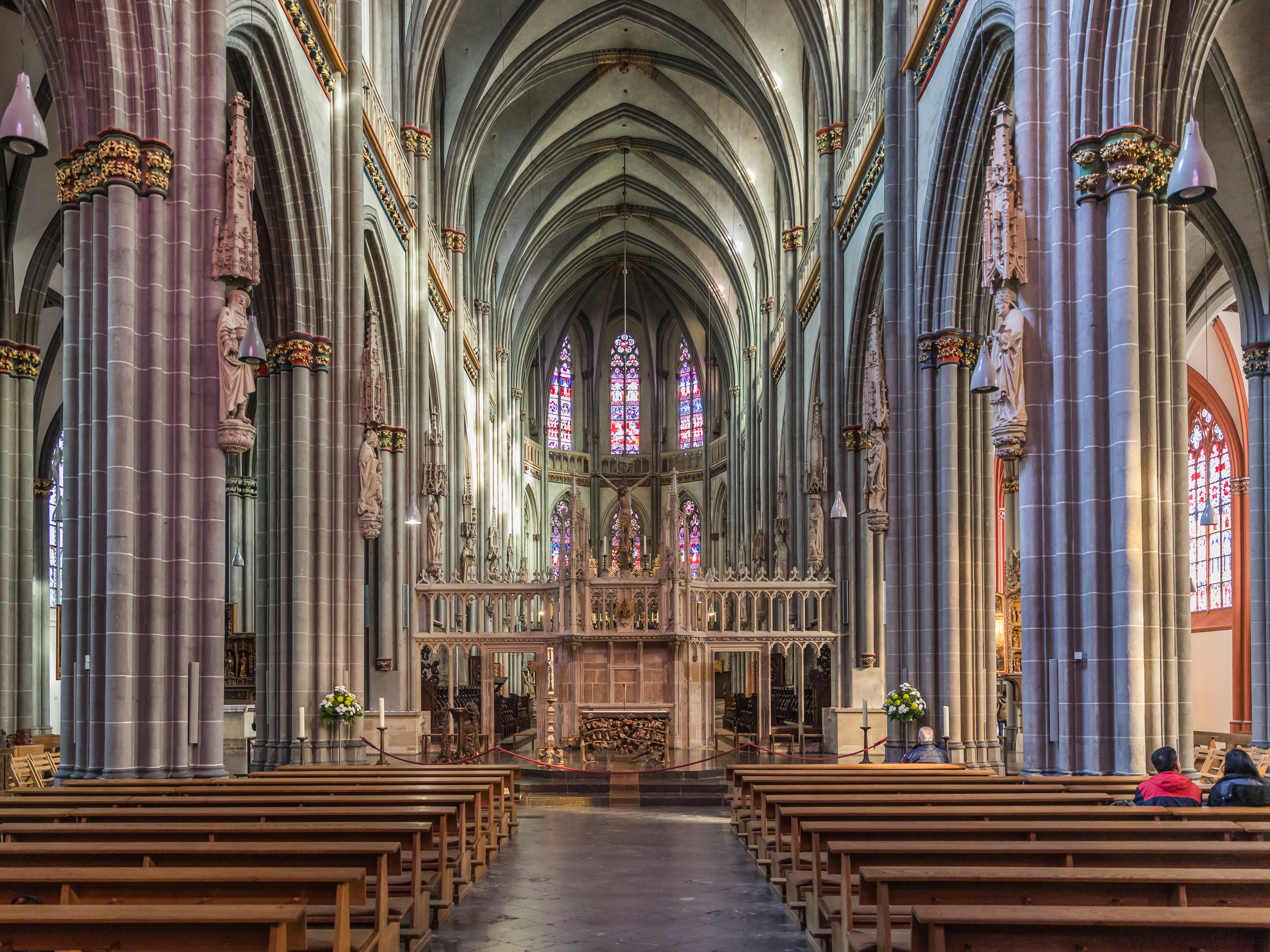
Xanten Cathedral (interior)

The cathedral owes its name to Victor of Xanten, a member of the Theban Legion who was supposedly executed in the 4th century in the amphitheater of Castra Vetera for refusing to sacrifice to the Roman gods. This Roman camp is near today's town of Birten. According to legend, Helena of Constantinople recovered the bones of Victor and his legion and erected a chapel in their honour. During a modern excavation the existence of a 4th-century cella memoriae was discovered; however, it was determined that it had not been erected for Victor but for two other male corpses that were placed in the crypt at a later date.

The cornerstone of the cathedral was laid in 1263 by Friedrich and Konrad von Hochstaden. Construction lasted 281 years and was finally finished with the dedication of the Holy Spirit Chapel (German: Heiliger-Geist-Kapelle) in the year 1544. The cathedral contains a five-aisle nave built in the Gothic style. In contrast to many other cathedrals of the period, St. Victor's lacks an ambulatory. Instead a twin pair of chapels is connected to the choir similar to that seen at the Church of Our Lady (German: Liebfrauenkirche) in Trier. Along with the monasterial library of the cathedral houses one of the most important religious libraries of the Lower Rhine.

The cathedral was formerly in possession of Jan van der Heyden's painting, View of a Dutch Square. The painting had been looted by the Nazis from the original owners, the German Jews Gottlieb and Mathilde Kraus. The Bavarian State sold the painting in 1962 to Henriette Hoffmann-von Schirach, a secretary to Adolf Hitler. The painting was purchased by the cathedral in 1963 at an auction in Cologne. In 2019, after eight years of negotiations, ownership of the painting was returned to the descendants of Gottlieb and Mathilde Kraus "in recognition of the Nazi injustice."

== Today ==
Today the cathedral is the seat of the auxiliary bishop Heinrich Janssen who presides over the Lower Rhine part of the Diocese of Münster.
