= Hans Hagen =

German computer scientist

Hans Hagen (born 1953) is a professor of computer science at the University of Kaiserslautern. His main research interests are scientific visualization and geometric modeling.

From 1999 to 2003 he was the editor in chief of IEEE Transactions on Visualization and Computer Graphics.

He got the John Gregory Memorial Award and the Solid Modelling Pioneer Award for his achievements in Geometric Modeling in 2002. His lifetime contributions to Scientific Visualization were honored by the IEEE Visualization Career Award and the IEEE Visualization Academy of Science membership.

(Prof. Dr.) Hans Hagen is not to be confused with Hans Hagen, the author of the ConTeXt macro package for the TeX typesetting system.
