= Ingebrigt Severin Hagen =

Norwegian physician and botanist

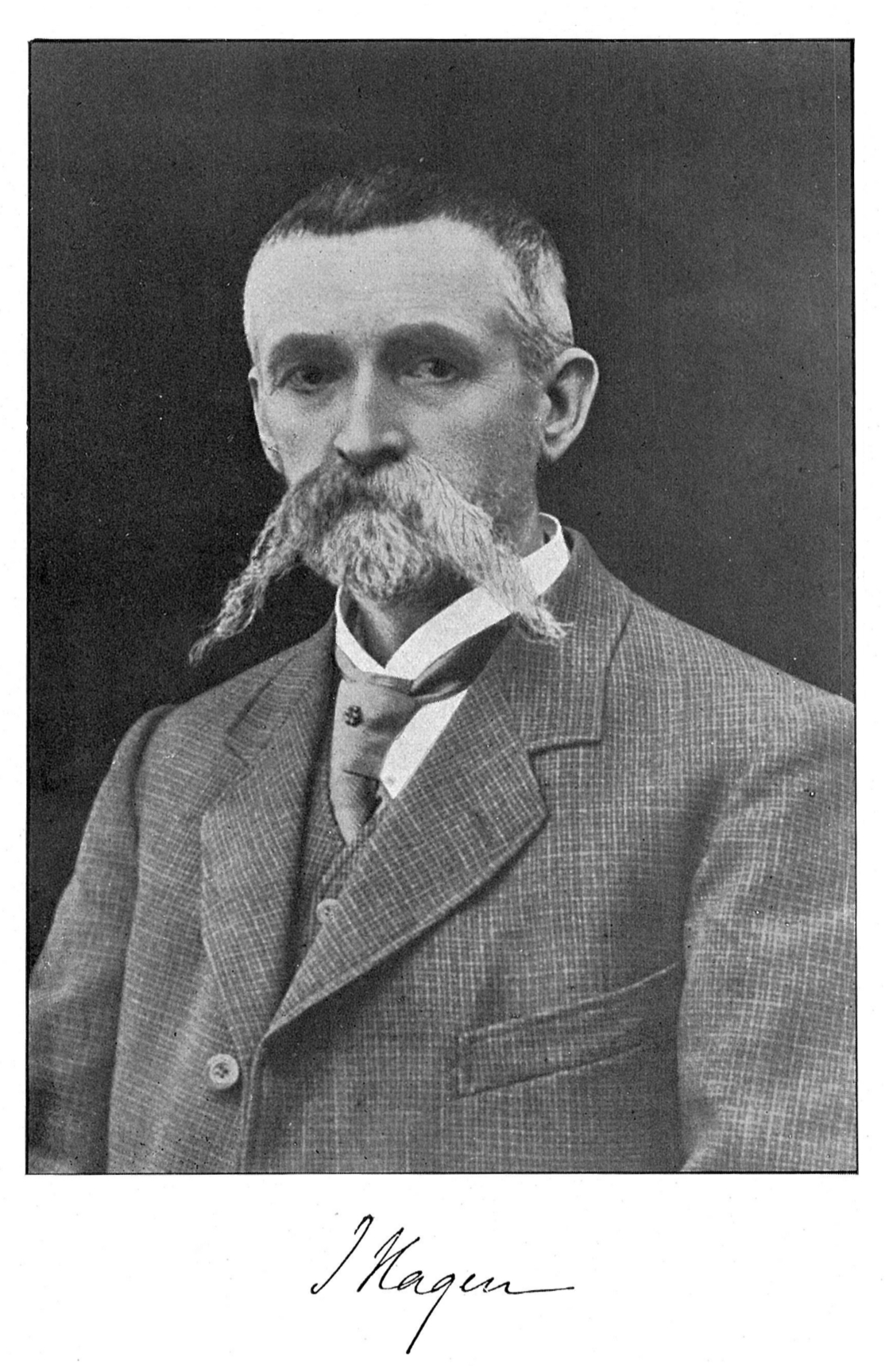
Portrait

Ingebrigt Severin Hagen (1852- 8 June 1917) was a Norwegian physician and botanist who specialized in the taxonomy of the bryophytes.

Born in Trondheim to shoemaker father Ingebrigt Hagen and Caroline Elizabeth née Helle, Hagen was academically gifted and graduated in arts from the Trondheim Cathedral School in 1870. He worked under Professor Worm Müller on physiological chemistry from around 1874–79 at Oslo. He then continued research in Uppsala, Sweden with Professor Holmgren in 1877 and then at Berlin, Leipzig and Dresden. He received a medical degree in 1883. He worked in Stören (1883–1884), Frederikstad, and during an epidemic in 1899, at Ilsviken. In 1897 he came a district legislator at Surendalen but quit work after a few months. He then moved to Oppdal Municipality, attracted by the mossflora, in June 1899 to work as a district clerk. He travelled around Norway to examine the mosses and slowly became less interested in his medical practice. He sought 3000 kr annually (later increased to 30,000 kr) for his research from the Nansen Foundation and his request was supported by Victor Schiffner of Vienna. From 1906, the Nansen Foundation supported him in his bryological research and he worked on Forarbejder til en Norsk Lövmosflora from 1908 to 1915 dealing with twenty moss families. In June 1910, he married Magdalene Dietrichs Borgen, daughter of a priest known for her work as an illustrator at the Trondheim museum.

Hagen published his major work as a series of books, he also published in journals and a series titled Musci Norvegiae Borealis (1899–1904). He edited and distributed the exsiccata-like series Musci Norvegici (1885-1903).

The standard author abbreviation I.Hagen is used to indicate this person as the author when citing a botanical name.
