= Edward Hagen (anthropologist) =

American biological anthropologist

Edward H. Hagen
- Born: Edward Harold Hagen; June 1, 1962 (age 64)
- Education: University of California, Berkeley; University of California, Santa Barbara
- Scientific career
- Fields: Biological anthropology Evolutionary anthropology
- Workplaces: Washington State University Vancouver
- Thesis: Two studies of differential parental investment: Child nutrition and health in a Yanomamö village, and the evolutionary psychology of postpartum depression (1999)
- Doctoral advisor: John Tooby
- Other academic advisors: Bruce Novak; Peter Hammerstein

Edward Harold Hagen (born June 1, 1962) is an American biological anthropologist and professor in the Department of Anthropology at Washington State University Vancouver, where he has taught since 2007. His research has focused on evolutionary explanations for mental health phenomena and substance use. He has studied the Yanomamö people of Venezuela and West African Pygmies such as the Aka people of the Congo Basin.
