= Edward Hagen (Minnesota politician) =

American politician

Edward Hagen (March 21, 1875 – November 5, 1950) was an American farmer, educator, and politician.

Hagen was born on a farm in Big Bend Township, Chippewa County, Minnesota and went to the Chippewa County public schools. He graduated from the University of Minnesota School of Agriculture in 1895. Hagen lived in Milan, Minnesota with his wife and family. He was a farmer and taught at the Chippewa County Rural Schools. Hagen served as the Big Bend Township justice of the peace, assessor, and supervisor. He also served in the Minnesota House of Representatives from 1933 to 1942 and in the Minnesota Senate from 1943 until his death in 1950.
